= List of moths of India (Geometridae) =

This is a list of moth species of the family Geometridae that are found in India.

It also acts as an index to the species articles and forms part of the full List of moths of India.

This list is based on a 2016 publication by Gunathilagaraj Kandasamy that included 1938 names (including synonyms) in 383 genera.

- Abaciscus intractabilis (Walker, 1864)
- Abaciscus tristis Butler, 1889
- Abraxaphantes perampla (Swinhoe, 1890)
- Abraxas abrasata Warren, 1898
- Abraxas adusta Hampson, 1891
- Abraxas alpestris Warren, 1893
- Abraxas capitata Warren, 1894
- Abraxas disrupta Warren, 1894
- Abraxas ditritaria Walker, 1862
- Abraxas elaioides Wehrli, 1931
- Abraxas etridoides Hampson, 1895
- Abraxas fasciaria Guerin-Meneville, 1843
- Abraxas fuscescens Butler, 1886
- Abraxas germana Swinhoe, 1891
- Abraxas illuminata Warren, 1894
- Abraxas intermedia Warren, 1888
- Abraxas irrorata Moore, 1867
- Abraxas irrula Hampson, 1891
- Abraxas kanoi Inoue, 1970
- Abraxas labraria Guenée, 1858
- Abraxas latizonata Hampson, 1907
- Abraxas leopardina (Kollar, 1844)
- Abraxas leucostola Hampson, 1893
- Abraxas luteolaria (Swinhoe, 1889)
- Abraxas martaria Guenée, 1858
- Abraxas metamorpha Warren, 1893
- Abraxas nigrivena Warren, 1893
- Abraxas notata Warren, 1894
- Abraxas ostrina Swinhoe, 1889
- Abraxas paucinotata Warren, 1894
- Abraxas picaria (Moore, 1867)
- Abraxas poliaria Swinhoe, 1889
- Abraxas poliostrota Hampson, 1907
- Abraxas prosthetocneca Prout, 1925
- Abraxas punctifera Walker, 1864
- Abraxas pusilla Butler, 1880
- Abraxas sordida Hampson, 1893
- Abraxas sylvata Scopoli, 1763
- Abraxas symmetrica Warren, 1894
- Abraxas todara Swinhoe, 1889
- Abraxas triseriaria Herrich-Schäffer, 1855
- Abraxas triseriata Warren, 1893
- Abraxas virginalis Butler, 1886
- Abraxesis melaleucaria Hampson, 1902
- Acacis viretata Hübner,
- Acacis viretata himalayica Prout, 1958
- Acolutha bicristipennis Prout, 1931
- Acolutha flavipictaria Prout, 1922
- Acolutha pictaria (Moore, 1888)
- Acolutha pulchella (Hampson, 1895)
- Actenochroma muscicoloraria Walker, 1862
- Agaraeus discolor Warren, 1893
- Agathia angustilimes Prout, 1926
- Agathia arcuata Moore, 1867
- Agathia beata Butler, 1880
- Agathia carissima prasina Swinhoe, 1893
- Agathia codina Swinhoe, 1892
- Agathia conviridaria (Hübner, 1823)
- Agathia diversiformis Warren, 1894
- Agathia gemma Swinhoe, 1892
- Agathia gigantea Butler, 1880
- Agathia hemithearia Guenée, 1857
- Agathia hilarata Guenée, 1858
- Agathia incudaria antitheta Prout
- Agathia laetata Fabricius, 1794
- Agathia laetata andamanensis Prout, 1932
- Agathia laetata isogyna Prout, 1916
- Agathia laqueifera Prout, 1912
- Agathia lycaenaria (Kollar, 1844)
- Agathia lycaenaria impar Prout, 1916
- Agathia magnifica Moore, 1879
- Agathia quinaria Moore, 1867
- Agathia visenda Butler, 1880
- Agathia visenda gaudens Prout, 1932
- Aglossochloris radiata (Walker, 1863)
- Agnibesa pictaria (Moore, 1867)
- Agnibesa plumbeolineata (Hampson, 1895)
- Agnibesa recurvilineta Moore, 1888
- Agnibesa venusta Warren, 1897
- Alcis admissaria (Guenée, 1858)
- Alcis albifera (Moore, 1887)
- Alcis atrostipata (Walker, 1862)
- Alcis decussata (Moore, 1867)
- Alcis granitaria (Moore, 1888)
- Alcis holophaearia (Hampson, 1907)
- Alcis imbecilis (Moore, 1888)
- Alcis iterata Butler, 1886
- Alcis jubata (Thunberg, 1788)
- Alcis latifasciata Warren, 1893)
- Alcis megaspilaria (Moore, 1867)
- Alcis nigralbata Warren, 1893
- Alcis nigridorsaria (Guenée, 1858)
- Alcis nilgirica (Hampson, 1895)
- Alcis orbifer Warren, 1896
- Alcis perspicuata (Moore, 1867)
- Alcis pleniferata (Walker, 1862)
- Alcis semiclarata (Walker, 1862)
- Alcis stictineura (Hampson, 1907)
- Alcis sublimis (Butler, 1889)
- Alcis subnitida Warren, 1893
- Alcis subolivacea (Hampson, 1907)
- Alcis subrufaria Warren, 1893
- Alcis tenera Warren, 1893
- Alcis trikotaria (Felder, 1874)
- Alcis variegata (Moore, 1888)
- Alcis variegata nebulosa (Swinhoe, 1891)
- Alcis venustularia (Walker, 1866)
- Alcis vialis (Moore, 1888)
- Alex palparia (Walker, 1861)
- Allaxitheca purpurascens (Moore, 1887)
- Amblychia angeronaria Guenée, 1858
- Amnesicoma albiseriata Warren, 1893)
- Amnesicoma bicolor Moore, 1888
- Amorphozancle discata Warren, 1893
- Anisodes absconditaria Walker, 1862
- Anisodes absconditaria assamica Prout, 1938
- Anisodes apogona Prout, 1938
- Anisodes arenosaria Moore, 1887
- Anisodes argentosa Prout, 1920
- Anisodes argyromma Warren, 1896
- Anisodes clandestina Prout, 1918
- Anisodes contrariata (Walker, 1861)
- Anisodes decretarioides Holloway
- Anisodes denticulata Hampson, 1895
- Anisodes discofera Swinhoe, 1894
- Anisodes dotilla Swinhoe, 1894
- Anisodes flavirubra Warren, 1896
- Anisodes flavispila Warren, 1896)
- Anisodes frenaria Guenée, 1858
- Anisodes frenaria pulverulenta (Swinhoe, 1892)
- Anisodes griseata belgaumensis Prout, 1938
- Anisodes heydena Swinhoe, 1894
- Anisodes illepidaria Guenée, 1858
- Anisodes insitiva Prout, 1920
- Anisodes intermixtaria Swinhoe, 1892
- Anisodes interpulsata Walker, 1861
- Anisodes intortaria Guenée, 1858
- Anisodes jocosa Warren, 1896
- Anisodes maximaria Guenée, 1858
- Anisodes monetaria Guenée, 1858
- Anisodes nebulosata Walker, 1862
- Anisodes obliviaria Walker, 1861
- Anisodes obrinaria (Guenée, 1858)
- Anisodes obstataria Walker, 1861
- Anisodes pallida Moore, 1889
- Anisodes perscripta Warren, 1896)
- Anisodes posticamplum (Swinhoe, 1892)
- Anisodes sarawackaria lichenaria Swinhoe, 1892
- Anisodes subdolaria Swinhoe, 1885
- Anisodes thermosaria Walker, 1862
- Anisodes variospila Warren, 1901)
- Anisozyga gavissima (Walker, 1861)
- Anisozyga textilis (Butler, 1880)
- Anonychia diversilinea Warren, 1897
- Anonychia lativitta (Moore, 1888)
- Anonychia rostrifera Warren, 1888)
- Anonychia strebla Prout, 1926
- Anthyperythra caladsaota Hampson, 1902
- Anthyperythra hermearia Swinhoe, 1891
- Antimimistis attenuata (Moore, 1887)
- Antimimistis subteracta Prout, 1925
- Antitrygodes agrata vicina (Thierry-Mieg, 1907)
- Antitrygodes cuneilinea (Walker, 1862)
- Antitrygodes divisaria (Walker, 1861)
- Antitrygodes ircina (Thierry-Mieg, 1907)
- Anydrelia dharmasalae (Butler, 1883)
- Apeira viridescens Warren, 1894)
- Apithecia viridata (Moore, 1868)
- Aplocera curvilineata (Walker, 1863)
- Aplocera plagiata (Linnaeus, 1758)
- Aplochlora vivilaca Walker, 1861
- Apophyga sericea Warren, 1893)
- Aporandria specularia (Guenée, 1857)
- Apostegania crina (Swinhoe, 1892)
- Archiplutodes prasina (Swinhoe, 1892)
- Arichanna albovittata Moore, 1887
- Arichanna biquadrata Warren, 1893
- Arichanna commixta Warren, 1893
- Arichanna consocia Butler, 1880
- Arichanna conspersa Butler, 1880
- Arichanna diversicolor Warren, 1888)
- Arichanna flavinigra Hampson, 1907
- Arichanna furcifera Moore, 1888
- Arichanna hamiltonia (Swinhoe, 1895)
- Arichanna interplagata (Guenée, 1858)
- Arichanna jaguarinaria (Oberthür, 1881)
- Arichanna lapsariata (Walker, 1862)
- Arichanna luciguttata Warren, 1893)
- Arichanna maculata (Moore, 1867)
- Arichanna marginata Warren, 1893
- Arichanna plagifera Walker, 1866
- Arichanna rubrifusa Hampson, 1907
- Arichanna rubrivena Warren, 1893
- Arichanna sparsa (Butler, 1890)
- Arichanna subaenescens Warren, 1893
- Arichanna subalbida Warren, 1893
- Arichanna tenebraria (Moore, 1867)
- Arichanna tramesata Moore, 1867
- Arichanna transectata (Walker, 1862)
- Arichanna transfasciata Warren, 1893
- Arichanna violacea Warren, 1893)
- Ascotis selenaria (Schiffermüller, 1775)
- Asthena albosignata (Moore, 1888)
- Asthena livida Warren, 1896)
- Atopophysa indistincta (Butler, 1889)
- Auzeodes chalybeata (Walker, 1866)
- Berta acte (Swinhoe, 1892)
- Berta albiplaga Warren, 1893
- Berta angustimedia Prout, 1918
- Berta annulifera Warren, 1896
- Berta anteplaga Prout, 1916
- Berta chrysolineata Walker, 1863
- Berta copiosa Prout, 1917
- Biston cognataria Guenée, 1858
- Biston falcata Warren, 1893)
- Biston porphyria (Butler, 1889)
- Biston regalis Moore, 1888
- Biston sinuata Hampson, 1895
- Bithiodes obliquata (Moore, 1888)
- Blepharoctenucha virescens (Butler, 1880)
- Boarmia adamata Felder, 1874
- Boarmia albibasis Hampson, 1895
- Boarmia arcearia Hampson, 1902
- Boarmia biserrata Hampson, 1902
- Boarmia bisinuata Hampson, 1895
- Boarmia carinenta (Cramer, 1777)
- Boarmia cervina Hampson, 1895
- Boarmia ceylonaria Nietner, 1861
- Boarmia cineracea Moore, 1888
- Boarmia cyclophora Hampson, 1902
- Boarmia diffusaria Albers, 1849
- Boarmia fimbriata Moore, 1867
- Boarmia flavimedia Hampson, 1895
- Boarmia glaucocincta Hampson, 1907
- Boarmia glaucodisca Swinhoe, 1894
- Boarmia hibernaria (Swinhoe, 1885)
- Boarmia infixaria Walker, 1860
- Boarmia latifascia Hampson, 1895
- Boarmia leucocyma Hampson, 1907
- Boarmia leucodontata Hampson, 1896
- Boarmia leucozona (Hampson, 1895)
- Boarmia melanosticta Hampson, 1895
- Boarmia nepalensis Hampson, 1902
- Boarmia nigralbata Warren, 1893
- Boarmia pallida Hampson, 1891
- Boarmia plumalis Butler, 1886
- Boarmia polystrota Hampson, 1907
- Boarmia procursaria Walker, 1860
- Boarmia reparata Walker, 1860
- Boarmia rubrifusa Warren, 1893
- Boarmia semialba (Moore, 1887)
- Boarmia separata Walker, 1860
- Boarmia separata intectaria (Walker, 1862)
- Boarmia serratilinea Warren, 1896)
- Boarmia suasaria Guenée, 1857
- Boarmia subtochracea Hampson, 1902
- Borbacha pardaria Guenée, 1857
- Brabira artemidora (Oberthür, 1884)
- Brabira artemidora pallida Moore, 1888
- Brabira atkinsonii Moore, 1888
- Brabira operosa Prout, 1958
- Buzura bengaliaria (Guenée, 1858)
- Buzura recursaria (Walker, 1860)
- Buzura suppressaria (Guenée, 1858)
- Buzura varianaria Swinhoe, 1889
- Bylazora infumata (Felder, 1874)
- Bylazora licheniferata Walker, 1862
- Bylazora pilicostata (Walker, 1862)
- Cacochloris uvidula (Swinhoe, 1885)
- Calicha retrahens Moore, 1888
- Callabraxas amanda Butler, 1880
- Callerinnys combusta Warren, 1893
- Callerinnys fuscomarginata Warren, 1893
- Callerinnys obliquilinea Moore, 1888
- Calletaera subexpressa (Walker, 1861)
- Calletaera subexpressa angulata Warren, 1896
- Calluga cissocosma (Turner, 1904)
- Calluga costalis (Moore, 1887)
- Calluga lophoceras Prout, 1931
- Callygris compositata (Guenée, 1857)
- Campaea biseriata (Moore, 1888)
- Camptolophia marmorata Warren, 1896
- Capasa abstractaria (Walker, 1862)
- Capasa festivaria (Fabricius, 1794)
- Capasa flavifusata (Moore, 1887)
- Capasa hyadaria (Guenée, 1858)
- Capasa iris (Butler, 1880)
- Capasa lycoraria (Guenée, 1858)
- Capasa muscicolor Warren, 1893)
- Capasa pachiaria (Walker, 1860)
- Capasa pulchraria (Rothschild, 1894)
- Capasa pyrrhularia (Guenée, 1857)
- Capasa quadraria Warren, 1893)
- Capasa rufescens (Butler, 1886)
- Capasa sternaria (Guenée, 1857)
- Capasa venusa (Swinhoe, 1894)
- Carbia nexilinea Warren, 1898)
- Carige cruciplaga (Walker, 1861)
- Carige lunulineata Moore, 1888
- Carige rachiaria Swinhoe, 1891
- Cassephyra cyanosticta (Hampson, 1907)
- Cassephyra lamprosticta Hampson, 1895
- Cassyma deletaria (Moore, 1888)
- Cassyma indistincta (Moore, 1887)
- Cassyma pallidula Warren, 1896)
- Cataclysme conturbata (Walker, 1863)
- Cataclysme obliquilineata Hampson, 1895
- Cataclysme polygramma Hampson, 1907
- Catoria olivescens Moore, 1888
- Catoria sublavaria Guenée, 1857
- Celerena andamana Felder, 1875
- Celerena divisa Walker, 1862
- Centronaxa orthostigialis Warren, 1893)
- Ceruncina translineata Walker, 1863
- Chaetolopha incurvata (Moore, 1888)
- Chalyboclydon flexilinea Warren, 1898
- Chalyboclydon marginata Warren, 1893
- Chartographa trigoniplaga (Hampson, 1895)
- Chiannia khasiana (Moore, 1888)
- Chloeres albifimbria Warren, 1896)
- Chloeres dyakaria (Walker, 1861)
- Chloeres quantula (Swinhoe, 1885)
- Chlorissa aquamarina (Hampson, 1895)
- Chlorissa discessa (Walker, 1861)
- Chlorissa distinctaria (Walker, 1866)
- Chlorissa distinctaria laeta (Prout, 1917)
- Chlorissa gelida (Butler, 1889)
- Chlorissa gelida exsoluta Prout
- Chlorissa nigropunctata Warren, 1893)
- Chlorissa punctifimbria Warren, 1896)
- Chlorissa rubripicta Warren, 1893)
- Chlorochaeta albicatena (Warren, 1896)
- Chlorochaeta albimarginata Warren, 1893
- Chlorochaeta biplaga (Walker, 1861)
- Chlorochaeta cassidara (Guenée, 1857)
- Chlorochaeta chalybeata Moore, 1867
- Chlorochaeta delineata Warren, 1893)
- Chlorochaeta inductaria (Guenée, 1857)
- Chlorochaeta integranota (Hampson, 1893)
- Chlorochaeta pictipennis (Butler, 1880)
- Chlorochaeta quadrinotata (Butler, 1889)
- Chlorochaeta quadrinotata fuscidorsata (Prout, 1912)
- Chlorochaeta signifera Warren, 1893)
- Chlorochaeta subhyalina Warren, 1899)
- Chlorochaeta tenera Warren, 1896)
- Chloroclystis actephilae Prout, 1958
- Chloroclystis acygonia Swinhoe, 1895
- Chloroclystis admixtaria (Walker, 1862)
- Chloroclystis atroviridis Warren, 1893)
- Chloroclystis breyniae Prout, 1958
- Chloroclystis chlorophilata Walker, 1863
- Chloroclystis consobrina Warren, 1901)
- Chloroclystis conversa Warren, 1897)
- Chloroclystis curviscapulis Prout, 1958
- Chloroclystis decolorata Warren, 1900)
- Chloroclystis emarginaria (Hampson, 1893)
- Chloroclystis filicata (Swinhoe, 1892)
- Chloroclystis griseorufa (Hampson, 1898)
- Chloroclystis immixtaria (Walker, 1862)
- Chloroclystis inaequata (Warren, 1896)
- Chloroclystis inexplicata Walker, 1866
- Chloroclystis infrazebrina (Hampson, 1895)
- Chloroclystis intentata (Walker, 1866)
- Chloroclystis lanaris Warren, 1896)
- Chloroclystis laticostata Walker, 1862
- Chloroclystis modesta Warren, 1893
- Chloroclystis naga Prout, 1958
- Chloroclystis olivata Warren, 1901)
- Chloroclystis palpata (Walker, 1852)
- Chloroclystis palpata diechusa Prout, 1958
- Chloroclystis papillosa Warren, 1896)
- Chloroclystis patinata (Warren, 1897)
- Chloroclystis plicata Hampson, 1912
- Chloroclystis polygraphata Hampson, 1912
- Chloroclystis recensitaria (Walker, 1862)
- Chloroclystis rectaria Hampson, 1903
- Chloroclystis rubrinotata Warren, 1893)
- Chloroclystis rubroviridis Warren, 1896)
- Chloroclystis sinuosa Swinhoe, 1895
- Chloroclystis sinuosa nigrilineata Hampson, 1896
- Chloroclystis spissidentata Warren, 1893)
- Chloroclystis subcostalis Hampson, 1893
- Chloroclystis subusta Warren, 1895)
- Chloroclystis taraxichroma Prout, 1958
- Chloroclystis trichophora Hampson, 1895
- Chloroclystis vata lucinda (Butler, 1879)
- Chloroclystis xanthocomes (Prout, 1926)
- Chlorodontopera chalybeata (Moore, 1872)
- Chlorodontopera discospilata (Moore, 1867)
- Chloromachia albisparsa (Walker, 1861)
- Chloromachia aureofulva Warren, 1897
- Chloromachia divapala (Walker, 1861)
- Chloromianta ferruginata Warren, 1896
- Chloromma mimica Warren, 1896
- Chloroparda palliplagiata (Walker, 1863)
- Chloropteryx opalaria Guenée, 1857
- Chlororithra fea (Butler, 1889)
- Chlorozancla falcatus (Hampson, 1895)
- Chorodna adumbrata Moore, 1887
- Chorodna erebusaria Walker, 1860
- Chorodna metaphaeria (Walker, 1862)
- Chorodna pallidularia Moore, 1867
- Chorodna praetextata (Felder, 1874)
- Chorodna testaceata Moore, 1867
- Chorodna vulpinaria Moore, 1867
- Chrioloba andrewesi Prout, 1958
- Chrioloba bifasciata (Hampson, 1891)
- Chrioloba bifasciata dentifascia Warren, 1904
- Chrioloba cinerea (Butler, 1880)
- Chrioloba cinerea plumbeola Prout, 1936
- Chrioloba etaina Swinhoe, 1900
- Chrioloba indicaria (Guerin-Meneville, 1843)
- Chrioloba ochraceistriga Prout, 1958
- Chrioloba olivaria Swinhoe, 1897
- Chrioloba olivescens Hampson, 1902
- Chrioloba subusta Warren, 1893)
- Chrioloba trinotata Warren, 1893)
- Chrysocraspeda abhadraca (Walker, 1861)
- Chrysocraspeda conspicuaria Swinhoe, 1905
- Chrysocraspeda fulviplaga Swinhoe, 1905
- Chrysocraspeda gibbosa Warren, 1896
- Chrysocraspeda iole (Swinhoe, 1892)
- Chrysocraspeda mitigata (Walker, 1861)
- Chrysocraspeda olearia Guenée, 1857
- Chrysocraspeda perpicta Warren, 1896
- Chrysocraspeda plumbeofusa Swinhoe, 1894
- Chrysocraspeda sanguinea Warren, 1896
- Chrysocraspeda subangulata Warren, 1896
- Cidaria antauges Prout, 1935
- Cidaria basharica Bang-Haas, 1927
- Cidaria cingala (Moore, 1887)
- Cidaria deletaria Hampson, 1902
- Cidaria fulvata Forster, 1771
- Cidaria ochripennis Prout, 1914
- Cleora acaciaria Boisduval, 1834
- Cleora alienaria (Walker, 1860)
- Cleora alienaria gelidaria (Walker, 1863)
- Cleora contiguata (Moore, 1867)
- Cleora cornaria (Guenée, 1858)
- Cleora cucullata (D. S. Fletcher, 1953)
- Cleora falculata (D. S. Fletcher, 1953)
- Cleora fraterna (Moore, 1888)
- Cleora impletaria (Walker, 1862)
- Cleora injectaria Walker, 1860
- Cleora inoffensa (Swinhoe, 1902)
- Cleora inoffensa cinereomarginata D. S. Fletcher, 1953
- Cleora onycha (D. S. Fletcher, 1953)
- Cleora processaria (Walker, 1860)
- Cleora propulsaria (Walker, 1860)
- Cleora subnigrata Warren, 1901)
- Cleora taprobana (D. S. Fletcher, 1953)
- Cleora tenebrata (D. S. Fletcher, 1953)
- Cleora undaria (Fabricius, 1794)
- Cleora vatia Prout, 1927
- Coenotephria brevifasciata Warren, 1888)
- Coenotephria championi Prout, 1926
- Coenotephria flavistrigata Warren, 1888)
- Coenotephria homophana (Hampson, 1895)
- Coenotephria homophoeta Prout, 1926
- Collix ghosha Walker, 1862
- Collix griseipalpis Wileman, 1916
- Collix hypospilata Guenée, 1858
- Collix leuciota Prout, 1924
- Collix rufipalpis (Hampson, 1907)
- Collix stellata Warren, 1894
- Colostygia albigirata (Kollar, 1844)
- Colostygia ustipennis (Hampson, 1895)
- Comostola chlorargyra (Walker, 1861)
- Comostola dispansa (Walker, 1861)
- Comostola hypotyphla Prout, 1917
- Comostola inops Prout, 1912
- Comostola laesaria (Walker, 1861)
- Comostola maculata (Moore, 1867)
- Comostola mundata Warren, 1896
- Comostola ovifera Warren, 1893)
- Comostola subtiliaria (Bremer, 1864)
- Comostola subtiliaria demeritaria Prout, 1917
- Comostola virago Prout, 1926
- Conolophia helicola (Swinhoe, 1894)
- Conolophia nigripuncta (Hampson, 1891)
- Corymica arnearia Walker, 1860
- Corymica deducta Walker, 1866
- Corymica exiguinota Hampson, 1891
- Corymica immaculata Warren, 1897
- Corymica pryeri Butler, 1878
- Corymica spatiosa Prout, 1925
- Corymica specularia Moore, 1867
- Corymica vesicularia Walker, 1866
- Cosmorhoe argentilineata (Moore, 1867)
- Cosmorhoe chalybearia (Moore, 1867)
- Cosmorhoe maia Prout, 1940
- Cosmorhoe neelys (Prout, 1940)
- Cosmorhoe siderifera (Moore, 1888)
- Craspediopsis bimaculata Warren, 1895
- Craspediopsis inaequata Warren, 1896
- Craspediopsis pallivittata (Moore, 1867)
- Craspediopsis persimilis (Moore, 1888)
- Cryptoloba aerata (Moore, 1867)
- Cryptoloba mesta Prout, 1958
- Cryptoloba minor Warren, 1893
- Cryptoloba peperitis Prout, 1958
- Ctenognophos eolaria (Guenée, 1858)
- Ctenognophos methoria Prout, 1926
- Ctenognophos niguzaria Walker, 1860
- Ctenognophos obtectaria (Walker, 1866)
- Ctenognophos paerlita Butler, 1886
- Ctenognophos ventraria Guenée, 1858
- Culcula panterinaria Bremer & Grey, 1855
- Curbia martiata (Guenée, 1858)
- Cusiala boarmoides (Moore, 1887)
- Cusiala raptaria (Walker, 1860)
- Cusuma flavifusa Hampson, 1893
- Cusuma vilis (Walker, 1854)
- Cyclothea disjuncta (Walker, 1861)
- Cystidia indrasana Moore, 1865
- Dalima apicata (Moore, 1867)
- Dalima calamina (Butler, 1880)
- Dalima gigantea Swinhoe, 1897
- Dalima intricata Warren, 1893
- Dalima latitans Warren, 1893)
- Dalima lucens Warren, 1893
- Dalima nubilata Hampson, 1895
- Dalima patularia (Walker, 1860)
- Dalima schistacearia Moore, 1867
- Dalima truncataria Moore, 1867
- Dalima vulpinaria (Moore, 1887)
- Debos iratus Swinhoe, 1885
- Derambila costata Warren, 1896
- Derambila fragilis Butler, 1880
- Derambila gertraudae Sommerer, 1995
- Derambila infelix (Swinhoe, 1885)
- Derambila lumenaria (Geyer, 1837)
- Derambila saponaria (Guenée, 1858)
- Derambila satelliata (Walker, 1866)
- Derambila satelliata dentifera (Moore, 1888)
- Dilophodes amplificata Bastelberger, 1905
- Dilophodes elegans (Butler, 1878)
- Dilophodes elegans khasiana (Swinhoe, 1892)
- Dindica olivacea Inoue, 1990
- Dindica para (Swinhoe, 1891)
- Dindica polyphaenaria Guenée, 1857
- Dindica subrosea Warren, 1893)
- Diplurodes coremiaria (Hampson, 1896)
- Discalma normata (Walker, 1861)
- Dischidesia cinerea (Butler, 1889)
- Discoglypha aureifloris Warren, 1896
- Discoglypha hampsoni (Swinhoe, 1892)
- Discoglypha inflammata Warren, 1896
- Discoglypha locupletata Prout, 1917
- Discoglypha punctimargo (Hampson, 1895)
- Discoglypha sanguinata Warren, 1896)
- Discoglypha variostigma Warren, 1896
- Dithecodes idaea (Swinhoe, 1892)
- Docirava aequilineata Walker, 1863
- Docirava fulgurata (Guenée, 1858)
- Docirava postochrea (Hampson, 1893)
- Docirava pudicata (Guenée, 1858)
- Dooabia lunifera (Moore, 1888)
- Dooabia viridata (Moore, 1867)
- Doratoptera nicevillei Hampson, 1895
- Dryochlora ophthalmicata (Moore, 1867)
- Dysphania alloides Prout, 1916
- Dysphania andamana (Moore, 1887)
- Dysphania aurilimbata (Moore, 1878)
- Dysphania bellona (Walker, 1854)
- Dysphania flavidiscalis Warren, 1895
- Dysphania jessica (Swinhoe, 1908)
- Dysphania malayanus (Guérin-Meneville, 1843)
- Dysphania malayanus recessa (Walker, 1861)
- Dysphania militaris (Linnaeus, 1758)
- Dysphania minervaria (Guenée, 1857)
- Dysphania nelera (Swinhoe, 1891)
- Dysphania palmyra (Stoll, 1790)
- Dysphania percota (Swinhoe, 1891)
- Dysphania porphyroides Prout, 1917
- Dysphania prunicolor (Moore, 1879)
- Dysphania subrepleta (Walker, 1854)
- Dysphania subrepleta excubifor Moore, 1878
- Dysstroma albiangulata Warren, 1893)
- Dysstroma calamistrata (Moore, 1867)
- Dysstroma cinereata (Moore, 1867)
- Dysstroma dentifera Warren, 1896
- Dysstroma flavifusa (Heydemann, 1929)
- Dysstroma fulvipennis (Hampson, 1902)
- Dysstroma planifasciata Prout, 1914
- Dysstroma sikkimensis (Heydemann, 1932)
- Dysstroma subapicaria Moore, 1862
- Dysstroma tenebricosa Heydemann, 1929
- Dysstroma truncata (Hufnagel, 1767)
- Ecliptopera delecta (Butler, 1880)
- Ecliptopera dentifera (Moore, 1888)
- Ecliptopera dissecta (Moore, 1887)
- Ecliptopera fulvidorsata (Swinhoe, 1894)
- Ecliptopera fulvotincta (Hampson, 1895)
- Ecliptopera furva (Swinhoe, 1891)
- Ecliptopera leucoglyphica Warren, 1898)
- Ecliptopera lucrosa Prout, 1940
- Ecliptopera macarthuri Prout, 1938
- Ecliptopera mixtilineata (Hampson, 1895)
- Ecliptopera muscicolor (Moore, 1888)
- Ecliptopera oblongata (Guenée, 1858)
- Ecliptopera obscurata (Moore, 1867)
- Ecliptopera rectilinea Warren, 1894
- Ecliptopera relata (Butler, 1880)
- Ecliptopera silaceata (Schiffermüller, 1775)
- Ecliptopera subapicalis (Hampson, 1891)
- Ecliptopera subfalcata Warren, 1893)
- Ecliptopera substituta (Walker, 1866)
- Ecliptopera triangulifera (Moore, 1888)
- Ecliptopera zophera Prout, 1931
- Ectropis bhurmitra (Walker, 1860)
- Ectropis breta (Swinhoe, 1889)
- Ectropis conifera (Moore, 1887)
- Ectropis crepuscularia (Denis & Schiffermüller, 1775)
- Ectropis dentilineata (Moore, 1867)
- Ectropis dentilineata pulverosa Warren, 1896)
- Ectropis deodarae Prout, 1926
- Ectropis enormis Warren, 1893
- Ectropis indistincta (Hampson, 1891)
- Ectropis irrorata (Moore, 1887)
- Ectropis marmorata (Moore, 1867)
- Ectropis ochrifasciata (Moore, 1880)
- Ectropis repleta Prout, 1926
- Ectropis squamosa Warren, 1896)
- Eilicrinia cordiaria (Hübner, 1790)
- Eilicrinia flava (Moore, 1888)
- Electrophaes aliena (Butler, 1880)
- Electrophaes aliena mesodonta Prout, 1940
- Electrophaes aspretifera Prout, 1938
- Electrophaes chrysophaes Prout, 1923
- Electrophaes cryopetra Prout, 1940
- Electrophaes fulgidaria (Leech, 1897)
- Electrophaes intertexta Warren, 1893)
- Electrophaes nigrifulvaria (Hampson, 1902)
- Electrophaes niveonotata (Warren, 1901)
- Electrophaes niveopicta Warren, 1893)
- Electrophaes zaphenges Prout, 1940
- Ellipostoma straminea Warren, 1893)
- Elphos hymenaria Guenée, 1858
- Elphos nimia Prout, 1925
- Elphos pardicelata Walker, 1862
- Enantiodes consanguinea Prout, 1926
- Enantiodes stellifera Warren, 1896
- Entephria poliotaria (Hampson, 1902)
- Entephria punctatissima Warren, 1893)
- Entomopteryx amputata Guenée, 1858
- Eois dissimilaris (Moore, 1887)
- Eois grataria (Walker, 1861)
- Eois ingrataria Warren, 1898)
- Eois lunulosa (Moore, 1887)
- Eois memorata (Walker, 1861)
- Eois phaneroscia Prout, 1922
- Eois plicata (Moore, 1888)
- Epicosymbia albivertex (Swinhoe, 1892)
- Epicosymbia albivertex ancillaria Warren, 1895)
- Epipristis minimaria Guenée, 1857
- Epipristis nelearia Guenée, 1857
- Episteira nigrifrons Warren, 1907)
- Episothalma ocellata (Swinhoe, 1893)
- Episothalma robustaria (Guenée, 1857)
- Erastria canente (Cramer, 1779)
- Erastria khasiana (Swinhoe, 1899)
- Erastria phoenix (Swinhoe, 1898)
- Erastria swinhoei (Butler, 1880)
- Erebomorpha fulguraria Walker, 1860
- Erebomorpha fulgurita Walker, 1860
- Eretmopus discissa (Walker, 1861)
- Eretmopus marinaria (Guenée, 1857)
- Erythrolophus fascicorpus Swinhoe, 1892
- Erythrolophus prasonarius Swinhoe, ?
- Eucrostes dispartata Walker, 1861
- Eumelea algidaria Walker, 1866
- Eumelea biflavata Warren, 1896
- Eumelea biflavata assamensis Prout, 1929
- Eumelea ludovicata Guenée, 1858
- Eumelea ludovicata biclarata Prout, 1931
- Eumelea rosalia Stoll, 1781
- Eumelea vulpenaria Stoll, 1782
- Eumelea vulpenaria feliciata Guenée, 1858
- Eumelea vulpenaria florinata Guenée, 1858
- Euphyia cinnamifusa Prout, 1939
- Euphyia contortilinea Warren, 1896
- Euphyia mediovittaria (Moore, 1867)
- Euphyia ochreata (Moore, 1888)
- Euphyia scortea (Swinhoe, 1891)
- Euphyia stellata Warren, 1893)
- Euphyia subangulata (Kollar, 1844)
- Euphyia submarginata Warren, 1909)
- Euphyia variegata (Moore, 1867)
- Euphyia viridis Warren, 1893)
- Eupithecia acolpodes Prout, 1938
- Eupithecia acutangula Hampson, 1895
- Eupithecia albibaltea Prout, 1958
- Eupithecia albifurva Hampson, 1907
- Eupithecia albigutta Prout, 1958
- Eupithecia albispumata Warren, 1892
- Eupithecia anasticta Prout, 1926
- Eupithecia asema Hampson, 1859
- Eupithecia atrisignis Butler, 1889
- Eupithecia biviridata Warren, 1896)
- Eupithecia chlorophora Swinhoe, 1895
- Eupithecia circumacta Prout, 1958
- Eupithecia conjunctiva Hampson, 1895
- Eupithecia costalis (Walker, 1863)
- Eupithecia costipicta Warren, 1893
- Eupithecia eupitheciata (Walker, 1863)
- Eupithecia fletcheri Prout, 1926
- Eupithecia fulvipennis Butler, 1889
- Eupithecia garuda Galsworthy & Mironov, 2005
- Eupithecia hemileuca Hampson, 1895
- Eupithecia hypognampta Prout, 1938
- Eupithecia incurvaria Hampson, 1903
- Eupithecia interrubrescens Hampson, 1902)
- Eupithecia invicta Vojnits, 1981
- Eupithecia irambata Warren, 1893
- Eupithecia lariciata mesodeicta Prout, 1938
- Eupithecia latimedia Hampson, 1895
- Eupithecia leucospila (Swinhoe, 1906)
- Eupithecia leucotaxis Prout, 1926
- Eupithecia lineosa Moore, 1888
- Eupithecia lineosa gulmargensis Prout, 1938
- Eupithecia lucigera Butler, 1889
- Eupithecia melanolopha Swinhoe, 1895
- Eupithecia nigrilinea Warren, 1896)
- Eupithecia nigrinotata Swinhoe, 1895
- Eupithecia ochracea Warren, 1888)
- Eupithecia quadripunctata Warren, 1888
- Eupithecia rajata Guenée, 1858
- Eupithecia raniata Prout, 1958
- Eupithecia rigida Swinhoe, 1892
- Eupithecia robiginascens Prout, 1926
- Eupithecia rubridorsata Hampson, 1895
- Eupithecia subrubescens Warren, 1888)
- Eupithecia subtacincta Hampson, 1895
- Eupithecia tricrossa Prout, 1926
- Eupithecia ustata Moore, 1888
- Eupithecidia variegata Hampson, 1891
- Euryobeidia languidata (Walker, 1915)
- Eurytaphria bisinuata Hampson, 1895
- Eurytaphria pachyceras Hampson, 1876
- Eurytaphria pallidula Warren, 1896
- Eurytaphria puratilineata (Hampson, 1895)
- Eurytaphria undilineata Warren, 1897
- Eurytaphria viridulata Warren, 1897
- Eurytaphria xanthoperata Hampson, 1896
- Eustroma aurantiaria Moore, 1867
- Eustroma aurigena (Butler, 1880)
- Eustroma chalcoptera (Hampson, 1895)
- Eustroma elista Prout, 1940
- Eustroma hampsoni Prout, 1958
- Eustroma inextricata (Walker, 1866)
- Eustroma lativittaria (Moore, 1867)
- Eustroma melancholica venipicta Warren, 1893
- Eutoea contigaria Walker, 1861
- Evecliptopera decurrens Moore, 1888
- Eutoea heteroneurata (Guenée, 1858)
- Fascellina chromataria Walker, 1860
- Fascellina dacoda Swinhoe, 1893
- Fascellina hypochryseis Swinhoe, 1894
- Fascellina inornata Warren, 1893
- Fascellina plagiata (Walker, 1866)
- Fascellina porphyreofusa Hampson, 1895
- Fascellina punctata Warren, 1898
- Fascellina rectimarginata Warren, 1894
- Fascellina subsignata Warren, 1893
- Fascellina vinosa Warren, 1892)
- Gandaritis flavata Moore, 1867
- Garaeus absona Swinhoe, 1889
- Garaeus albipunctatus Hampson, 1895
- Garaeus apicata (Moore, 1867)
- Garaeus argillacea Butler, 1889
- Garaeus colorata Warren, 1893
- Garaeus cruentatus Butler, 1886
- Garaeus flavipicta Hampson, 1912
- Garaeus fulvata Walker, 1861
- Garaeus muscorarius Hampson, 1897
- Garaeus signata Butler, 1896
- Garaeus specularis Moore, 1867
- Gasterocome pannosaria (Moore, 1867)
- Gelasma acutissima (Walker, 1861)
- Gelasma acutissima goniaria (Felder, 1875)
- Gelasma adaptaria Prout, 1933
- Gelasma auspicata Prout, 1917
- Gelasma convallata (Warren, 1896)
- Gelasma dissimulata (Walker, 1861)
- Gelasma dissimulata nigrifrons Hampson, 1896
- Gelasma fuscifimbria Prout, 1911
- Gelasma glaucaria Walker, 1866
- Gelasma griseoviridis Warren, 1893
- Gelasma hemitheoides Prout, 1916
- Gelasma immacularia (Fabricius, 1794)
- Gelasma inaptaria (Walker, 1863)
- Gelasma insignipecten Prout, 1928
- Gelasma mutatilinea Prout, 1916
- Gelasma thetydaria (Guenée, 1857)
- Gelasma veninotata Warren, 1894)
- Genusa bigutta (Walker, 1855)
- Geometra flavifrontaria (Guenée, 1858)
- Geometra smaragdus (Butler, 1880)
- Glossotrophia jacta (Swinhoe, 1884)
- Gnamptoloma aventiaria (Guenée, 1858)
- Gnamptopteryx perficita (Walker, 1858)
- Gnophos accipitraria Guenée, 1858
- Gnophos aereus Butler, 1886
- Gnophos albidior (Hampson, 1895)
- Gnophos albistellaria Warren, 1893)
- Gnophos orphninaria Hampson, 1902
- Gnophos rufitinctaria Hampson, 1902
- Gnophos tephrosiaria Moore, 1887
- Gnophos vitreata (Hampson, 1895)
- Gnophosema isometra Warren, 1888)
- Gonanticlea anticleata (Moore, 1888)
- Gonanticlea aversa Swinhoe, 1892
- Gonanticlea occlusata (Felder, 1875)
- Gonanticlea occlusata laetifica Prout, 1931
- Goniopterobola zalska (Swinhoe, 1894)
- Gonodontis aethocrypta Prout, 1926
- Gonodontis clelia Cramer, 1780
- Gymnoscelis albicaudata Warren, 1897
- Gymnoscelis confusata (Walker, 1866)
- Gymnoscelis conjurata Prout, 1958
- Gymnoscelis deleta Hampson, 1891
- Gymnoscelis derogata (Walker, 1866)
- Gymnoscelis distatica Prout, 1958
- Gymnoscelis ectochloros Hampson, 1891
- Gymnoscelis fasciata Hampson, 1895
- Gymnoscelis imparatalis (Walker, 1865)
- Gymnoscelis inexpressa Prout, 1923
- Gymnoscelis latipennis Prout, 1958
- Gymnoscelis polyclealis (Walker, 1859)
- Gymnoscelis polyodonta Swinhoe, 1895
- Gymnoscelis roseifascia Hampson, 1895
- Gymnoscelis semialbida (Walker, 1866)
- Gymnoscelis tibialis (Moore, 1887)
- Gymnoscelis tristrigosa (Butler, 1880)
- Gymnoscelis tristrigosa nasuta Prout, 1958
- Hastina caeruleolineata Moore, 1888
- Hastina gemmifera (Moore, 1867)
- Hastina pluristrigata (Moore, 1867)
- Helicopage hirundinalis Warren, 1896
- Hemistola antigone Prout, 1917
- Hemistola detracta (Walker, 1861)
- Hemistola efformata Warren, 1893)
- Hemistola fuscimargo Prout, 1935
- Hemistola loxiaria Guenée, 1857
- Hemistola malachitaria (Prout, 1917)
- Hemistola rectlinea Warren, 1896
- Hemistola rubricosta Prout, 1916
- Hemistola rubrimargo Warren, 1893)
- Hemistola subcaerulea Prout, 1934
- Hemithea aestivaria (Hübner, 1789)
- Hemithea antigrapha Prout, 1917
- Hemithea costipunctata (Moore, 1867)
- Hemithea insularia (Guenée, 1858)
- Hemithea insularia profecta Prout, 1933
- Hemithea marina (Butler, 1878)
- Hemithea melalopha Prout, 1931
- Hemithea tritonaria (Walker, 1863)
- Hemithea wuka Pagenstecher, 1886
- Herochroma baba (Swinhoe, 1932)
- Herochroma cristata Warren, 1894
- Herochroma elaearia Hampson, 1932
- Herochroma farinosa Warren, 1893)
- Herochroma flavitincta Warren, 1897)
- Herochroma liliana (Swinhoe, 1892)
- Herochroma ochreipicta Swinhoe, 1905
- Herochroma orientalis (Holloway, 1982)
- Herochroma subopalina Warren, 1894)
- Herochroma subtepens (Walker, 1860)
- Herochroma usneata (Felder, 1875)
- Herochroma viridaria Moore, 1867
- Heterabraxas fulvosparsa Hampson, 1895
- Heterabraxas pardaria (Moore, 1867)
- Heterabraxas spontaneata (Walker, 1862)
- Heterobapta plumellata Wiltshire, 1943
- Heterocallia basharica (Wehrli, 1932)
- Heterocallia hepaticata (Swinhoe, 1894)
- Heterocallia temeraria (Swinhoe, 1891)
- Heterolocha cinerea Warren, 1896)
- Heterolocha citrina Prout, 1916
- Heterolocha decoloraria Hampson, 1902
- Heterolocha disistaria (Walker, 1862)
- Heterolocha falconaria Walker, 1866
- Heterolocha hypoleuca Hampson, 1907
- Heterolocha lonicerae Prout, 1926
- Heterolocha obliquaria Hampson, 1902
- Heterolocha patalata (Felder, 1874)
- Heterolocha phoenicotaeniata Kollar, 1844
- Heterophleps acineta Prout, 1926
- Heterophleps bicommata Warren, 1893)
- Heterophleps longiramus (Hampson, 1898)
- Heterophleps ocyptaria (Swinhoe, 1893)
- Heterophleps quadripuncta Warren, 1898
- Heterostegane aurantiaca Warren, 1894
- Heterostegane bilineata (Butler, 1883)
- Heterostegane lala Swinhoe, 1892
- Heterostegane latifasciata (Moore, 1887)
- Heterostegane maculifascia Hampson, 1891
- Heterostegane rectifascia Hampson, 1892
- Heterostegane subfasciata Warren, 1899
- Heterostegane subtessellata (Walker, 1862)
- Heterostegane tritocampsis (Prout, 1934)
- Heterostegane urbica (Swinhoe, 1895)
- Heterostegania lunulosa (Moore, 1888)
- Hirasa contubernalis Moore, 1888
- Hirasa licheneus (Oberthür, 1886)
- Hirasa muscosaria Walker, 1866
- Hirasa scripturaria (Walker, 1866)
- Horisme flavofasciata (Moore, 1888)
- Horisme hyperythra (Hampson, 1895)
- Horisme leprosa (Hampson, 1891)
- Horisme nigrovittata Warren, 1888)
- Horisme olivata Warren, 1901)
- Horisme plurilineata (Moore, 1888)
- Horisme rufipicta (Hampson, 1895)
- Horisme suffusa Hampson, 1895
- Hyalinetta circumflexa (Kollar, 1848)
- Hybridoneura abnormis Warren, 1898
- Hybridoneura metachlora (Hampson, 1907)
- Hydatocapnia marginata Warren, 1893)
- Hydrelia bicolorata Moore, 1867
- Hydrelia cingulata Hampson, 1896
- Hydrelia crocearia Hampson, 1896
- Hydrelia ferruginaria (Moore, 1867)
- Hydrelia flavilinea Warren, 1893)
- Hydrelia lineata Warren, 1893)
- Hydrelia marginipunctata Warren, 1893
- Hydrelia ornata (Moore, 1867)
- Hydrelia rhodoptera Hampson, 1895
- Hydrelia rufigrisea Warren, 1893)
- Hydrelia rufinota Hampson, 1896
- Hydrelia sanguiflua Hampson, 1896
- Hydrelia sericea (Butler, 1880)
- Hydrelia subobliquaria (Moore, 1867)
- Hydrelia undulosata Moore, 1888
- Hypenorhynchus erectilineata (Moore, 1888)
- Hypephyra subangulata Warren, 1896
- Hypephyra terrosa Butler, 1889
- Hyperythra lutea Stoll, 1781
- Hyperythra susceptaria Walker, 1866
- Hyperythra swinhoei Butler, 1880
- Hypochroma hypochrosis (Guenée, 1858)
- Hypocometa auxostira (Prout, 1925)
- Hypocometa clauda Warren, 1896
- Hypocometa decussata (Moore, 1867)
- Hypomecis lioptilaria (Swinhoe, 1901)
- Hypomecis oblivia (Prout, 1925)
- Hypomecis polysticta (Hampson, 1902)
- Hypomecis ratotaria (Swinhoe, 1894)
- Hypomecis tetragonata (Walker, 1862)
- Hypomecis transcissa (Walker, 1860)
- Hyposidra albifera (Moore, 1879)
- Hyposidra aquilaria Walker, 1862
- Hyposidra infixaria (Walker, 1860)
- Hyposidra murina (Swinhoe, 1891)
- Hyposidra picaria (Walker, 1866)
- Hyposidra polia Hampson, 1896
- Hyposidra talaca Walker, 1860
- Hyposidra violescens Hampson, 1895
- Hypulia continua Walker, 1861
- Hysterura cervinaria (Moore, 1868)
- Hysterura multifaria (Swinhoe, 1889)
- Hysterura protagma Prout, 1940
- Idaea actiosaria (Walker, 1861)
- Idaea acuminata (Moore, 1888)
- Idaea aequisinuata Warren, 1898)
- Idaea amplipennis (Butler, 1889)
- Idaea andamanica Prout, 1938
- Idaea bilinea (Swinhoe, 1885)
- Idaea carpheraria (Hampson, 1907)
- Idaea castelli (Prout, 1926)
- Idaea charidotes (Prout, 1922)
- Idaea chotaria (Swinhoe, 1886)
- Idaea chrysocilia (Hampson, 1891)
- Idaea conioptera (Hampson, 1903)
- Idaea costiguttata Warren, 1896)
- Idaea craspedota (Prout, 1934)
- Idaea decidua Warren, 1900)
- Idaea delibata (Prout, 1926)
- Idaea delicatula Warren, 1901)
- Idaea dilutaria Hübner, 1798
- Idaea falcipennis Warren, 1893
- Idaea flavisinuata Warren, 1896)
- Idaea gemmaria (Hampson, 1896)
- Idaea grisescens Warren, 1896)
- Idaea humeraria (Walker, 1862)
- Idaea improvisa (Prout, 1938)
- Idaea inaudax (Prout, 1926)
- Idaea indecorata Warren, 1900)
- Idaea indeprensa (Prout, 1925)
- Idaea indeterminata Warren, 1901)
- Idaea informis Warren, 1897)
- Idaea infortunata (Prout, 1938)
- Idaea insuavis Butler, 1889
- Idaea lacteipennis (Butler, 1889)
- Idaea leucozona (Hampson, 1893)
- Idaea leucozona luteata Warren, 1896)
- Idaea lineata (Hampson, 1893)
- Idaea macrospila (Prout, 1926)
- Idaea maculata Warren, 1896)
- Idaea marcidaria (Walker, 1861)
- Idaea marmorata (Hampson, 1903)
- Idaea mesodela (Prout, 1926)
- Idaea methaemaria (Hampson, 1903)
- Idaea micra (Hampson, 1893)
- Idaea obliquilinea Warren, 1896)
- Idaea onchnophora (Prout, 1939)
- Idaea opsitelea monodia (Prout, 1938)
- Idaea palniensis (Prout, 1920)
- Idaea perpulverea (Hampson, 1903)
- Idaea persimilis Warren, 1896)
- Idaea phoenicoptera (Hampson, 1896)
- Idaea profanaria (Walker, 1866)
- Idaea protensa (Butler, 1889)
- Idaea ptyonopoda (Hampson, 1895)
- Idaea pulchrifascia (Hampson, 1903)
- Idaea purpurea (Hampson, 1891)
- Idaea rubellata Warren, 1896)
- Idaea rubridentata Warren, 1896)
- Idaea ruptifascia Warren, 1896)
- Idaea sabulosa (Prout, 1913)
- Idaea semilinea Warren, 1896)
- Idaea semisericea Warren, 1897)
- Idaea testacea (Swinhoe, 1885)
- Idaea thricophora (Hampson, 1895)
- Idaea triangularis (Hampson, 1895)
- Idaea vacillata (Walker, 1862)
- Idaea violacea (Hampson, 1891)
- Idiochlora caudularia (Guenée, 1857)
- Idiochlora contracta Warren, 1896
- Idiochlora planata (Prout, 1917)
- Idiochlora planata dorsinigrata (Prout, 1917)
- Idiochlora pudentifimbria (Prout, 1912)
- Idiochlora xanthochlora (Swinhoe, 1894)
- Iotaphora iridicolor (Butler, 1880)
- Iridoplecta ferrifera (Moore, 1888)
- Isoloba bifasciata Warren, 1893
- Jodis albipncta Warren, 1898
- Jodis argutaria (Walker, 1866)
- Jodis coeruleata Warren, 1896
- Jodis delicatula Warren, 1896
- Jodis inumbrata Warren, 1896
- Jodis iridescens Warren, 1896
- Jodis irregularis Warren, 1894)
- Jodis nanda (Walker, 1861)
- Jodis pallescens (Hampson, 1891)
- Jodis rhabdota Prout, 1917
- Jodis subtractata (Walker, 1863)
- Jodis undularia Hampson, 1891
- Jodis xynia Prout, 1917
- Krananda diversa Warren, 1894
- Krananda oliveomarginata Swinhoe, 1894
- Krananda semihyalina Moore, 1867
- Laciniodes denigrata Warren, 1896
- Laciniodes plurilinearia (Moore, 1867)
- Leptodontopera basipuncta (Moore, 1867)
- Leptodontopera rufitinctaria Hampson, 1902
- Leptomiza calcearia Walker, 1860
- Leptomiza dentilineata (Moore, 1887)
- Leptostegna asiatica Warren, 1893)
- Leptostegna tenerata (Christoph, 1881)
- Ligdia adustata Schiffermüller, 1775
- Ligdia coctata Guenée, 1858
- Lipomelia subusta Warren, 1893
- Lissoblemma lunuliferata (Walker, 1862)
- Lobogonia ambusta Warren, 1893
- Lobogonia olivata Warren, 1896
- Lobogonodes multistriata (Butler, 1889)
- Lobogonodes multistriata tensa Prout, 1940
- Lomographa alba Moore, 1887
- Lomographa foedata Warren, 1894)
- Lomographa griseola Warren, 1893)
- Lomographa inamata (Walker, 1861)
- Lomographa longipennis Warren, 1897)
- Lomographa margarita (Moore, 1867)
- Lomographa platyleucata (Walker, 1866)
- Lophobates ochricostata (Hampson, 1898)
- Lophomachia albiradiata Warren, 1893)
- Lophomachia discipennata (Walker, 1861)
- Lophomachia picturata (Hampson, 1903)
- Lophomachia semialba (Walker, 1861)
- Loxaspilates atrisquamata Hampson, 1907
- Loxaspilates dispar Warren, 1893
- Loxaspilates hastigera Butler, 1889
- Loxaspilates obliquaria Moore, 1867
- Loxaspilates triumbrata Warren, 1895)
- Loxofidonia bareconia (Swinhoe, 1894)
- Loxofidonia buda (Swinhoe, 1895)
- Loxofidonia cingala Moore, 1887
- Loxofidonia obfuscata Warren, 1893)
- Loxorhombia idea (Swinhoe, 1890)
- Luxiaria acutaria (Snellen, 1877)
- Luxiaria amasa (Butler, 1878)
- Luxiaria despicata Prout, 1929
- Luxiaria emphatica Prout, 1925
- Luxiaria hyaphanes Hampson, 1891
- Luxiaria mitorrhaphes Prout, 1925
- Luxiaria phyllosaria Walker, 1860
- Luxiaria postvittata Walker, 1861
- Luxiaria submonstrata (Walker, 1861)
- Luxiaria subrasata (Walker, 1861)
- Luxiaria tephrosaria (Moore, 1867)
- Luxiaria turpisaria Walker, 1861
- Lycaugidia albatus Swinhoe, 1885
- Macaria quadraria (Moore, 1887)
- Maidana tetragonata Walker, 1862
- Mariaba convoluta (Walker, 1866)
- Maxates coelataria (Walker, 1861)
- Maxates coelataria trychera Prout, 1933
- Maxates macariata (Walker, 1863)
- Medasina albidaria Walker, 1866
- Medasina albidentata (Moore, 1867)
- Medasina basistrigaria (Moore, 1867)
- Medasina cervina Warren, 1893)
- Medasina combustaria (Walker, 1866)
- Medasina contaminata (Moore, 1887)
- Medasina creataria Guenée, 1858
- Medasina dissimilis Moore, 1887
- Medasina firmilinea Prout, 1926
- Medasina fratercula (Moore, 1887)
- Medasina gleba (Swinhoe, 1885)
- Medasina interruptaria Moore, 1887
- Medasina junctilinea Hampson, 1907
- Medasina lampasaria Hampson, 1895
- Medasina leledaria Swinhoe, 1905
- Medasina livida Warren, 1893)
- Medasina mauraria (Guenée, 1858)
- Medasina mucidaria (Walker, 1866)
- Medasina nigrovittata Moore, 1867
- Medasina objectaria (Walker, 1866)
- Medasina obliterata (Moore, 1867)
- Medasina plumosa Hampson, 1895
- Medasina pulverulenta Hampson, 1895
- Medasina quadrinotata Warren, 1893
- Medasina reticulata Hampson, 1895
- Medasina scotosiaria Warren, 1893
- Medasina sikkima (Moore, 1887)
- Medasina similis Moore, 1888
- Medasina strixaria Guenée, 1858
- Medasina tephrosiaria Warren, 1896)
- Medasina vagans (Moore, 1887)
- Melanthia catenaria (Moore, 1867)
- Melanthia dentistrigata Warren, 1893)
- Melanthia exquisita Warren, 1893)
- Menophra bicornuta Inoue, 1990
- Menophra codra (Swinhoe, 1891)
- Menophra costistrigata Warren, 1896)
- Menophra cuprearia (Moore, 1867)
- Menophra decorata (Moore, 1867)
- Menophra humeraria (Moore, 1867)
- Menophra jugorum (Felder, 1874)
- Menophra lignata Warren, 1894
- Menophra melagrapharia (Hampson, 1907)
- Menophra nigrifasciata Hampson, 1891
- Menophra perserrata (Walker, 1862)
- Menophra retractaria (Moore, 1867)
- Menophra serpentinaria Warren, 1896)
- Menophra subplagiata (Walker, 1860)
- Menophra subterminalis (Prout, 1925)
- Menophra torridaria Moore, 1888
- Menophra trilineata Warren, 1896
- Mesoleuca costipannaria (Moore, 1867)
- Metabraxas coryneta (Swinhoe, 1894)
- Metabraxas fasciata (Swinhoe, 1894)
- Metabraxas regularis Warren, 1893)
- Metabraxas tincta (Hampson, 1895)
- Metallaxis semipurpurascens Hampson, 1896
- Metallaxis semiustus (Swinhoe, 1894)
- Metallolophia ocellata Warren, 1897)
- Metallolophia opalina Warren, 1893)
- Metamenophra canidorsata (Walker, 1866)
- Metamenophra delineata (Walker, 1860)
- Metamenophra inouei (Sato, 1987)
- Metamenophra subpilosa Warren, 1894)
- Micrabraxas cupriscotia (Hampson, 1902)
- Micrabraxas incolorata Warren, 1893
- Micrabraxas melanodonta (Hampson, 1907)
- Micrabraxas punctigera (Butler, 1889)
- Micrabraxas tenuis Warren, 1897)
- Microcalicha minima Warren, 1896)
- Microloxia herbaria indecretata (Walker, 1863)
- Microloxia leprosa (Hampson, 1893)
- Micronissa delphinaria Swinhoe, 1893
- Micrulia medioplaga (Swinhoe, 1902)
- Micrulia tenuilinea Warren, 1896
- Milionia basalis Walker, 1854
- Milionia glauca (Stoll, 1782)
- Milionia luculenta Swinhoe, 1889
- Milionia pulchrinervis Felder, 1868
- Mimochroa albifrons (Moore, 1888)
- Mimochroa angulifascia (Moore, 1888)
- Mimochroa gynopteridia (Butler, 1880)
- Mimochroa hypoxantha (Kollar, 1828)
- Mixocera parvulata (Walker, 1863)
- Mixochlora vittata (Moore, 1867)
- Mixolophia ochrolauta Warren, 1894
- Monocerotesa radiata Warren, 1897)
- Monocerotesa strigata Warren, 1893)
- Myrioblephara duplexa Moore, 1888
- Myrioblephara idaeoides (Moore, 1888)
- Myrioblephara idaeoides albipunctata Warren, 1893
- Myrioblephara rubrifusca Warren, 1893
- Myrioblephara simplaria (Swinhoe, 1894)
- Myrioblephara xanthozonea (Hampson, 1907)
- Myrteta fuscolineata Swinhoe, 1894
- Myrteta luteifrons (Swinhoe)
- Myrteta obliqua (Hampson, 1893)
- Myrteta ocernaria (Swinhoe, 1893)
- Myrteta planaria Walker, 1861
- Myrteta sericea (Butler, 1881)
- Myrteta simpliciata (Moore, 1867)
- Myrteta subpunctata Warren, 1893)
- Myrteta subvitrea Hampson, 1895
- Myrteta unipuncta Warren, 1893)
- Nadagara comprensata Walker, 1862
- Nadagara inordinata Walker, 1862
- Nadagara orbipuncta Prout, 1925
- Nadagara vigaia Walker, 1862
- Naxa obliterata Warren, 1893)
- Naxa seriaria (Motschulsky, 1866)
- Naxa textilis Walker, 1856
- Naxa textilis parvipuncta Prout, 1916
- Naxidia irrorata (Moore, 1888)
- Naxidia punctata Butler, 1886
- Neohipparchus maculata Warren, 1897)
- Neohipparchus vallata (Butler, 1878)
- Neohipparchus variegata (Butler, 1889)
- Neotephria avinoffi Prout, 1939
- Neotephria ramalaria Felder, 1875
- Nothocasis knyvetti (Prout, 1958)
- Nothocasis sikkima (Moore, 1888)
- Nothomiza achromaria (Guenée, 1858)
- Nothomiza binotata Warren, 1897)
- Nothomiza cinerascens (Moore, 1888)
- Nothomiza costalis (Moore, 1867)
- Nothomiza costinotata Warren, 1893)
- Nothomiza dentisignata (Moore, 1867)
- Nothomiza nana Warren, 1897
- Nothomiza peralba (Swinhoe, 1894)
- Nothomiza viridis Warren, 1893
- Nycterosea obstipata (Fabricius, 1794)
- Obeidia diversicolor Warren, 190
- Obeidia fumosa Warren, 1893
- Obeidia lucifera Swinhoe, 1893
- Obeidia millepunctata Warren, 1893
- Obeidia tigrata (Guenée, 1857)
- Ocoelophora agana Prout, 1926
- Ocoelophora maculifera Warren, 1896
- Ocoelophora ochreifusca (Hampson, 1896)
- Odontopera angularia (Moore, 1867)
- Odontopera bilinearia (Swinhoe, 1889)
- Odontopera bivittaria (Moore, 1867)
- Odontopera cervinaria (Moore, 1867)
- Odontopera fuscilinea (Hampson, 1907)
- Odontopera heydena (Swinhoe, 1894)
- Odontopera justa (Prout, 1928)
- Odontopera kametaria (Felder, 1873)
- Odontopera lentiginosaria (Moore, 1867)
- Odontopera obliquaria (Moore, 1867)
- Odontopera similaria (Moore, 1888)
- Oenospila flavifusata (Walker, 1861)
- Oenospila strix (Butler, 1889)
- Omphacodes directa (Walker, 1861)
- Onagrodes obscurata Warren, 1896
- Onellaba botydata Walker, 1862
- Ophthalmitis caritaria (Walker, 1860)
- Ophthalmitis herbidaria (Guenée, 1858)
- Ophthalmitis irrorataria (Bremer & Grey, 1853)
- Ophthalmitis lectularia Swinhoe, 1891
- Ophthalmitis pertusaria Felder, 1874
- Ophthalmitis sinensium Oberthür, 1913
- Ophthalmitis striatifera Hampson, 1902
- Ophthalmitis cordularia (Swinhoe, 1893)
- Ophthalmitis diurnaria Guenée, 1858
- Opisthograptis crataegata Linnaeus, 1761
- Opisthograptis irrorata (Hampson, 1895)
- Opisthograptis moelleri Warren, 1893
- Opisthograptis sulphurea (Butler, 1880)
- Opisthograptis tridentifera Moore, 1888
- Opisthotia tumidilinea (Moore, 1888)
- Organopoda annulifera (Butler, 1889)
- Organopoda annulifera signifera Prout, 1938
- Organopoda carnearia (Walker, 1861)
- Organopoda carnearia himalaica Prout, 1938
- Ornithospila avicularia (Guenée, 1857)
- Ornithospila esmeralda (Hampson, 1895)
- Ornithospila lineata (Moore, 1872)
- Orthoserica rufigrisea Warren, 1896
- Osteosema alboviridis (Moore, 1872)
- Osteosema pastor Butler, 1880
- Osteosema sanguilineata (Moore, 1867)
- Ourapteryx clara Butler, 1880
- Ourapteryx ebuleata (Guenée, 1858)
- Ourapteryx excellens (Butler, 1889)
- Ourapteryx margaritata (Moore, 1868)
- Ourapteryx marginata (Hampson, 1895)
- Ourapteryx multistrigaria Walker, 1866
- Ourapteryx peermaadiata Thierry-Mieg, 1903
- Ourapteryx picticaudata (Walker, 1860)
- Ourapteryx pluristrigata Warren, 1888)
- Ourapteryx podaliriata (Guenée, 1858)
- Ourapteryx primularis (Butler, 1886)
- Ourapteryx sciticaudaria (Walker, 1862)
- Ourapteryx triangularia Moore, 1867
- Oxymacaria ceylonica Hampson, 1902
- Oxymacaria palliata Hampson, 1891
- Oxymacaria pectinata Hampson, 1902
- Ozola extersaria (Walker, 1861)
- Ozola falcipennis (Moore, 1888)
- Ozola impedita biangulifera (Moore, 1888)
- Ozola macariata (Walker, 1863)
- Ozola microniaria Walker, 1862
- Ozola minor (Moore, 1888)
- Ozola picaria (Swinhoe, 1892)
- Ozola sinuicosta Prout, 1910
- Ozola sinuicosta grisescens Prout, 1910
- Palaeaspilates ocularia (Fabricius, 1775)
- Palaeaspilates rufaria Warren, 1896)
- Palaeomystis falcataria (Moore, 1867)
- Palpoctenidia phoenicosoma (Swinhoe, 1895)
- Pamphlebia rubrolimbraria (Guenée, 1857)
- Panulia ajaia (Walker, 1859)
- Panulia lapidata Warren, 1893)
- Panulia vulsipennis (Prout, 1934)
- Paradarisa chloauges (Prout, 1927)
- Paradarisa comparataria (Walker, 1866)
- Paradarisa heledaria (Swinhoe, 1893)
- Paralcis conspicuata (Moore, 1888)
- Paralcis rufaria Warren, 1896
- Paralcis subochrea Warren, 1896
- Paralcis thricophora (Hampson, 1895)
- Paramaxates polygrapharia (Walker, 1860)
- Paramaxates posterecta Holloway, 1976
- Paramaxates vagata (Walker, )
- Parasynegia atomaria Warren, 1896
- Parasynegia complicata Warren, 1893
- Parasynegia diffusaria (Moore, 1868)
- Parasynegia lidderdalii (Butler, 1880)
- Parasynegia macularia Warren, 1894
- Parasynegia nigriclavata Warren, 1897
- Parasynegia pluristriata (Walter, 1863)
- Parasynegia rufinervis Warren, 1896
- Parasynegia submissa Warren, 1894
- Parasynegia suffusa Warren, 1893
- Parasynegia vitticostata (Walker, 1862)
- Parazoma ferax Prout, 1926
- Parazoma hypobasis Prout, 1931
- Parazoma semifusca Warren, 1896
- Pareclipsis gracilis (Butler, 1879)
- Pareclipsis umbrata Warren, 1893
- Parectropis conspurcata (Walker, 1866)
- Pareumelea eugeniata (Guenée, 1858)
- Pareumelea fimbriata (Stoll, 1782)
- Pareustroma fissisignis (Butler, 1880)
- Peetula exanthemata Moore, 1888
- Peetula stramineata Warren, 1888)
- Pentheochlora uniformis (Hampson, 1895)
- Peratophyga hyalinata Kollar, 1844
- Peratophyga xanthyala (Hampson, 1896)
- Percnia belluaria Guenée, 1858
- Percnia confusa Warren, 1894
- Percnia ductaria (Walker, 1862)
- Percnia felinaria Guenée, 1858
- Percnia foraria (Guenée, 1858)
- Percnia giraffata (Guenée, 1858)
- Percnia interfusa Warren, 1893
- Percnia maculata (Moore, 1867)
- Perizoma affinis (Moore, 1888)
- Perizoma albidivisa Warren, 1893
- Perizoma albofasciata (Moore, 1888)
- Perizoma antisticta Prout, 1938
- Perizoma antisticta methemon Prout, 1939
- Perizoma apicistrigata Warren, 1893
- Perizoma bicolor Warren, 1893
- Perizoma cerva (Hampson, 1902)
- Perizoma conjuncta Warren, 1893
- Perizoma constricta Warren, 1901
- Perizoma decorata (Moore, 1888)
- Perizoma fasciata Warren, 1893
- Perizoma fulvimacula (Hampson, 1896)
- Perizoma herrichiata (Snellen, 1874)
- Perizoma interrupta Warren, 1893
- Perizoma lacernigera (Butler, 1889)
- Perizoma lacteiguttata Warren, 1893
- Perizoma maculata (Moore, 1888)
- Perizoma minuta (Butler, 1889)
- Perizoma minuta latifasciata Warren, 1893
- Perizoma mordax Prout, 1939
- Perizoma olivacea Warren, 1893)
- Perizoma plumbeata (Moore, 1888)
- Perizoma rectifasciata Hampson, 1902
- Perizoma schistacea (Moore, 1888)
- Perizoma seriata (Moore, 1888)
- Perizoma tenuifascia Warren, 1896
- Perizoma triplagiata Warren, 1896
- Perizoma variabilis Warren, 1893
- Perizoma variabilis condignata Prout, 1938
- Petelia albopunctata (Swinhoe, 1891)
- Petelia capitata (Walker, 1867)
- Petelia fasciata (Moore, 1868)
- Petelia immaculata Hampson, 1893
- Petelia medardaria Herrich-Schäffer, 1856
- Petelia vexillaria (Swinhoe, 1885)
- Pholodes fuliginea (Hampson, 1895)
- Pholodes nigrescens Warren, 1893)
- Pholodes squamosa Warren, 1896)
- Photoscotosia albapex Hampson, 1895
- Photoscotosia amplicata (Walker, 1862)
- Photoscotosia annubilata Prout, 1940
- Photoscotosia atromarginata Warren, 1893
- Photoscotosia dejuncta Prout, 1937
- Photoscotosia fulguritis Warren, 1893
- Photoscotosia metachryseis Hampson, 1896
- Photoscotosia miniosata (Walker, 1862)
- Photoscotosia multilinea Warren, 1893
- Photoscotosia nubilata Moore, 1888
- Photoscotosia obliquisignata Moore, 1867
- Photoscotosia undulosa (Alphéraky, 1888)
- Phthonandria atrilineata Butler, 1881
- Phthonandria atrilineata indica Inoue, 1990
- Phthonandria conjunctiva Warren, 1896
- Phthonoloba fasciata (Moore, 1888)
- Physetobasis annulata Hampson, 1891
- Physetobasis dentifascia Hampson, 1895
- Physetobasis griseipennis Moore, 1888
- Piercia divergens (Butler, 1889)
- Piercia imbrata (Guenée, 1858)
- Pingasa alba Swinhoe, 1891
- Pingasa chlora (Stoll, 1752)
- Pingasa chlora crenaria (Guenée, 1858)
- Pingasa dispensata (Walker, 1862)
- Pingasa elutriata Prout, 1916
- Pingasa lariaria (Walker, 1860)
- Pingasa multispurcata Prout, 1913
- Pingasa pseudoterpinaria (Guenée, 1858)
- Pingasa pseudoterpinaria gracilis Prout, 1916
- Pingasa pseudoterpinaria tephrosiaria Guenée, 1858
- Pingasa rubicunda Warren, 1894
- Pingasa rufofasciata Moore, 1888
- Pingasa ruginaria Guenée, 1857
- Pingasa ruginaria andamanica Prout, 1916
- Pingasa subviridis Warren, 1896
- Pingasa venusta Warren, 1894
- Plagodis inusitaria (Moore, 1867)
- Plagodis reticulata Warren, 1893
- Platycerota olivatia Hampson, 1902
- Platycerota spilotelaria (Walker, 1862)
- Plutodes costatus (Butler, 1886)
- Plutodes cyclaria Guenée, 1858
- Plutodes discigera Butler, 1880
- Plutodes exiguifascia Hampson, 1895
- Plutodes exquisita Butler, 1880
- Plutodes flavescens Butler, 1880
- Plutodes lamisca Swinhoe, 1894
- Plutodes nilgirica Hampson, 1895
- Plutodes philornia Prout, 1926
- Plutodes subcaudata Butler, 1880
- Plutodes transmutata Walker, 1861
- Pogonopygia nigralbata Warren, 1894
- Polynesia curtitibia Prout, 1912
- Polynesia sunandava Walker, 1861
- Polynesia truncapex Swinhoe, 1892
- Polystroma adumbrata (Kollar, 1844)
- Pomasia denticlathrata Warren, 1893
- Pomasia parerga Prout, 1941
- Pomasia psylaria Guenée, 1858
- Pomasia pulchrilinea Walker, 1866
- Pomasia punctaria Hampson, 1912
- Pomasia reticulata Hampson, 1895
- Pomasia sparsata Hampson, 1902
- Praegnophosema drypepes Prout, 1935
- Prasinocyma floresaria (Walker, 1866)
- Prasinocyma perpulverata Prout, 1916
- Prionodonta amethystina Warren, 1893
- Pristostegania trilineata (Moore, 1867)
- Probithia exclusa Walker, 1860
- Problepsis albidior Warren, 1899
- Problepsis apollinaria Guenée, 1858
- Problepsis apollinaria candidior Prout, 1917
- Problepsis conjunctiva Warren, 1893
- Problepsis crassinotata Prout, 1917
- Problepsis deliaria (Guenée, 1858)
- Problepsis delphiaria (Guenée, 1858)
- Problepsis longipannis Prout, 1917
- Problepsis ocellata cinerea Butler, 1886
- Problepsis vulgaris Butler, 1889
- Prochasma dentilinea Warren, 1893)
- Prochasma mimica Warren, 1897
- Prometopidia conisaria Hampson, 1902
- Proomphe lobata Warren, 1896
- Prorhinia pallidaria Moore, 1881
- Prorhinia pingasoides (Warren, 1893)
- Protonebula combusta (Swinhoe, 1894)
- Protonebula cupreata (Moore, 1867)
- Pseudalcis renaria (Guenée, 1858)
- Pseudeuchlora kafebera (Swinhoe, 1894)
- Pseudiodis albidentula (Hampson, 1907)
- Pseudiodis unifascia Hampson, 1891
- Pseudomimetis picta Warren, 1901)
- Pseudomiza argentilinea (Moore, 1867)
- Pseudomiza castanearia (Moore, 1867)
- Pseudomiza cruentaria (Moore, 1867)
- Pseudomiza flava Moore, 1888
- Pseudomiza leucogonia (Hampson, 1895)
- Pseudomiza ochrilinea Warren, 1896)
- Pseudomiza viridispurca Prout, 1927
- Pseudopanthera himaleyica (Kollar, 1848)
- Pseudosterrha paulula (Swinhoe, 1886)
- Psyra anglifera Walker, 1866
- Psyra cuneata Walker, 1860
- Psyra debilis Warren, 1888
- Psyra similaria (Moore, 1888)
- Psyra spurcataria (Walker, 1862)
- Psyra trilineata (Moore, 1888)
- Ptochophyle marginata Warren, 1897)
- Ptocophyle flavipuncta (Prout, 1938)
- Ptocophyle permutans (Hampson, 1891)
- Ptocophyle togata (Fabricius, 1798)
- Ptocophyle tristicula (Swinhoe, 1885)
- Ptocophyle volutaria (Swinhoe, 1886)
- Pyrrhorachis caerulea Warren, 1893)
- Pyrrhorachis cornuta Warren, 1896
- Pyrrhorachis cosmetocraspeda Prout, 1918
- Pyrrhorachis pyrrhogona (Walker, 1866)
- Pyrrhorachis pyrrhogona turgescens Prout, 1917
- Racotis boarmiaria Guenée, 1858
- Racotis discistigmaria (Hampson, 1902)
- Racotis inconclusa Walker, 1860
- Racotis sordida Warren, 1896
- Rheumaptera abraxidia (Hampson, 1895)
- Rheumaptera anestia (Prout, 1941)
- Rheumaptera hypolopha (Hampson, 1895)
- Rheumaptera scotaria Hampson, 1907
- Rheumaptera titubata (Prout, 1941)
- Rheumaptera tremodes (Prout, 1940)
- Rhodometra sacraria (Linnaeus, 1767)
- Rhodostrophia anomala Warren, 1895
- Rhodostrophia bicolor Warren, 1895
- Rhodostrophia cinerascens (Moore, 1888)
- Rhodostrophia cinerascens borealis (Swinhoe, 1889)
- Rhodostrophia dissoluta Prout, 1938
- Rhodostrophia glaucofusa (Hampson, 1907)
- Rhodostrophia haematozona Hampson, 1895
- Rhodostrophia herbicolens (Butler, 1883)
- Rhodostrophia inaffectata Prout, 1938
- Rhodostrophia inconspicua (Butler, 1886)
- Rhodostrophia meonaria (Guenée, 1857)
- Rhodostrophia muricolor Warren, 1897
- Rhodostrophia olivacea Warren, 1895
- Rhodostrophia pelloniaria (Guenée, 1858)
- Rhodostrophia pelloniaria khasiana (Moore, 1888)
- Rhodostrophia peregrina (Kollar, 1844)
- Rhodostrophia poliaria Hampson, 1903
- Rhodostrophia poliaria excellens Prout, 1938
- Rhodostrophia pulverearia Hampson, 1903
- Rhodostrophia similata (Moore, 1888)
- Rhodostrophia stigmatica (Butler, 1889)
- Rhodostrophia subrufa Warren, 1897
- Rhodostrophia tristrigalis Butler, 1889
- Rhodostrophia vinacearia Moore, 1867
- Rhomborista devexata (Walker, 1861)
- Rhomborista semipurpurea Warren, 1897
- Rhynchobapta cervinaria Moore, 1888
- Rhynchobapta eburnivena Warren, 1896)
- Rhynchobapta flaviceps Butler, 1881
- Rhynchobapta irrorata Hampson, 1902
- Rhynchobapta punctilinearia (Leech, 1891)
- Ruttelerona cessaria (Walker, 1860)
- Ruttelerona harmonica Hampson, 1895
- Sabaria costimaculata (Moore, 1867)
- Sabaria euchroes Prout, 1917
- Sabaria incitata (Walker, 1862)
- Sabaria intexta (Swinhoe, 1891)
- Sabaria lithosiaria (Walker, 1862)
- Sabaria obliquilineata Warren, 1893)
- Sabaria pallida (Moore, 1877)
- Sabaria rondelaria (Fabricius, 1775)
- Sabaria serpentinaria (Walker, 1866)
- Sarcinodes aequilinearia (Walker, 1860)
- Sarcinodes carnearia Guenée, 1857
- Sarcinodes debitaria (Walker, 1863)
- Sarcinodes lilacina Moore, 1888
- Sarcinodes restitutaria (Walker, 1862)
- Sarcinodes susana (Swinhoe, 1891)
- Sauris abnormis (Moore, 1888)
- Sauris bicolor Warren, 1896)
- Sauris cinerosa Warren, 1894
- Sauris eupitheciata (Snellen, 1881)
- Sauris hirudinata Guenée, 1858
- Sauris ignobilis Butler, 1880
- Sauris improspera Prout, 1931
- Sauris inscissa Prout, 1958
- Sauris interruptata (Moore, 1888)
- Sauris lineosa (Moore, 1888)
- Sauris nigrifusalis Warren, 1896
- Sauris nigripalpata Walker, 1862
- Sauris perfasciata Hampson, 1895
- Sauris proboscidaria Walker, 1862
- Scardamia metallaria Guenée, 1858
- Scardamia rectilinea Warren, 1896
- Scardamia seminigra Prout, 1925
- Schistophyle falcifera Warren, 1896
- Sciadia tenebraria (Esper, 1806)
- Scionomia lignicolor Warren, 1893)
- Scopula acharis Prout, 1938
- Scopula achrosta Prout, 1935
- Scopula actuaria (Walker, 1861)
- Scopula addictaria (Walker, 1861)
- Scopula adeptaria (Walker, 1861)
- Scopula albiflava Warren, 1896)
- Scopula albomaculata (Moore, 1888)
- Scopula anaitisaria (Walker, 1861)
- Scopula annexata Prout, 1938
- Scopula annularia (Swinhoe, 1890)
- Scopula asparta Prout, 1938
- Scopula aspilataria (Walker, 1861)
- Scopula atriceps (Hampson, 1895)
- Scopula atridiscata Warren, 1897)
- Scopula attentata nicobarica Prout, 1938
- Scopula bispurcata Warren, 1898)
- Scopula butyrosa Warren, 1893)
- Scopula caesaria (Walker, 1861)
- Scopula campbelli Prout, 1920
- Scopula celebraria (Walker, 1861)
- Scopula cleoraria (Walker, 1861)
- Scopula coangulata Prout, 1920
- Scopula complanata Warren, 1896)
- Scopula consimilata Warren, 1896)
- Scopula costata (Moore, 1887)
- Scopula decorata eurhythma Prout, 1935
- Scopula deliciosaria (Walker, 1861)
- Scopula dimoera Prout, 1922
- Scopula emissaria (Walker, 1861)
- Scopula erubescens Warren, 1895)
- Scopula eulomata (Snellen, 1877)
- Scopula extimaria (Walker, 1861)
- Scopula ferrilineata (Moore, 1888)
- Scopula ferruginea (Hampson, 1893)
- Scopula fibulata (Guenée, 1858)
- Scopula flavifurfurata Prout, 1920
- Scopula fluidaria (Swinhoe, 1886)
- Scopula furfurata Warren, 1897)
- Scopula humilis Prout, 1913
- Scopula hyphenophora Warren, 1896)
- Scopula idearia (Swinhoe, 1886)
- Scopula inangulata Warren, 1896)
- Scopula incanata (Linnaeus, 1758)
- Scopula inflexibilis Prout, 1931
- Scopula insolata (Butler, 1889)
- Scopula intensata (Moore, 1887)
- Scopula intensata ochriata Prout, 1938
- Scopula kashmirensis (Moore, 1888)
- Scopula kashmirensis gooraisensis Prout, 1935
- Scopula kashmirensis quettensis Prout, 1935
- Scopula linearis (Hampson, 1891)
- Scopula mecysma (Swinhoe, 1894)
- Scopula melanstigma Prout, 1938
- Scopula modesta (Moore, 1887)
- Scopula monosema Prout, 1923
- Scopula moorei (Cotes & Swinhoe, 1888)
- Scopula moorei metarsia Prout, 1938
- Scopula nesciaria (Walker, 1861)
- Scopula nigridentata Warren, 1896
- Scopula nitidissima Prout, 1920
- Scopula ocheracea (Hampson, 1891)
- Scopula ochricrinita Prout, 1920
- Scopula opicata (Fabricius, 1798)
- Scopula pallida Warren, 1888)
- Scopula patularia (Walker, 1866)
- Scopula pedilata (Felder, 1875)
- Scopula polystigmaria Hampson, 1903
- Scopula prosthiostigma Prout, 1938
- Scopula pulchellata (Fabricius, 1794)
- Scopula pulverosa (Prout, 1934)
- Scopula quinquestriata Warren, 1896)
- Scopula remotata (Guenée, 1858)
- Scopula rufistigma Warren, 1895)
- Scopula scialophia Prout, 1919
- Scopula sordida Warren, 1895)
- Scopula stigmata (Moore, 1888)
- Scopula subcarnea Warren, 1934)
- Scopula sublutescens Prout, 1920
- Scopula subpartita Prout, 1919
- Scopula subtracta Prout, 1935
- Scopula tenuimedia Prout, 1938
- Scopula undulataria Moore, 1888
- Scopula unilineata Warren, 1896)
- Scopula violacea Warren, 1897)
- Scopula walkeri (Butler, 1883)
- Scotopteryx arthuri (Prout, 1939)
- Scotopteryx duplicata Warren, 1853)
- Scotopteryx fissiferata (Walker, 1862)
- Scotopteryx junctata (Staudinger, 1882)
- Scotopteryx leucocypta (Hampson, 1902)
- Scotopteryx nasifera Warren, 1888)
- Scotopteryx roseicilia (Hampson, 1895)
- Scotopteryx roseifascia (Hampson, 1895)
- Semiothisa acutaria (Walker, 1869)
- Semiothisa apataria (Swinhoe, 1893)
- Semiothisa atmala (Swinhoe, 1894)
- Semiothisa avitusaria (Walker, 1860)
- Semiothisa azataria (Swinhoe, 1893)
- Semiothisa effusata (Guenée, 1857)
- Semiothisa eleonora (Stoll, 1780)
- Semiothisa elvirata (Guenée, 1858)
- Semiothisa emersaria (Walker, 1861)
- Semiothisa emersaria albidulata Warren, 1898
- Semiothisa fasciata (Stoll, 1780)
- Semiothisa fidoniata (Guenée, 1858)
- Semiothisa frugaliata (Guenée, 1858)
- Semiothisa fumipennis (Hampson, 1895)
- Semiothisa honoria (Hampson, 1912)
- Semiothisa inchoata (Walker, 1861)
- Semiothisa maculosata Warren, 1896
- Semiothisa myandaria (Walker, 1863)
- Semiothisa nora (Walker, 1861)
- Semiothisa octolinearia (Swinhoe, 1894)
- Semiothisa oliva (Swinhoe, 1894)
- Semiothisa ozararia (Walker, 1860)
- Semiothisa penumbrata Warren, 1896
- Semiothisa perfumata (Bastelberger, 1907)
- Semiothisa perfusaria (Walker, 1866)
- Semiothisa pervolgata (Walker, 1861)
- Semiothisa placida (Moore, 1888)
- Semiothisa pluviata (Fabricius, 1795)
- Semiothisa posticaria (Walker, 1869)
- Semiothisa psammodes (Bastelberger, 1907)
- Semiothisa quadraria (Moore, 1887)
- Semiothisa ruptifascia Warren, 1896 )
- Semiothisa streniataria (Walker, 1861)
- Semiothisa subalbataria (Swinhoe, 1889)
- Semiothisa subcaudaria (Walker, 1861)
- Semiothisa sufflata (Guenée, 1858)
- Semiothisa triangulata (Hampson, 1891)
- Semiothisa trillinearia (Moore, 1888)
- Semiothisa variolinea Warren, 1896 )
- Semiothisa xanthonora (Walker, 1861)
- Sirinopteryx quadripunctata Moore, 1867
- Sirinopteryx rufilineata Warren, 1893
- Sirinopteryx rufivinctata Walker, 1862
- Sirinopteryx undulifera Warren, 1893
- Somatina anthophilata Guenée, 1857
- Somatina omicraria Fabricius, 1798
- Somatina plynusaria (Walker, 1862)
- Somatina postlineata Warren, 1899
- Somatina purpurascens (Moore, 1887)
- Somatina rosacea Swinhoe, 1894
- Spaniocentra isiopania Prout, 1917
- Spaniocentra lyra (Swinhoe, 1892)
- Spaniocentra pannosa (Moore, 1887)
- Sphagnodela lucida Warren, 1893
- Spilopera anomala Warren, 1893
- Spilopera divaricata Moore, 1888
- Stamnodes elwesi Alphéraky, 1895
- Stamnodes pauperaria pamphilata (Felder, 1875)
- Stenorumia ablunata (Guenée, 1858)
- Stenorumia duplicilinea Hampson, 1895
- Stenorumia longipennis Warren, 1893)
- Swannia marmorea Prout, 1926
- Symmacra genuflexus (Hampson, 1895)
- Symmacra regularis Warren, 1896
- Symmacra solidaria (Guenée, 1858)
- Symmacra solidaria validaria (Walker, 1866)
- Symmimetis cristata Warren, 1897
- Synegia camptogrammaria (Guenée, 1858)
- Synegia conflagrata Hampson, 1912
- Synegia erythra (Hampson, 1891)
- Synegia eumeleata Walker, 1861
- Synegia imitaria (Walker, 1861)
- Synegia maculosata Warren, 1896)
- Synegia medionubis Prout, 1925
- Synegiodes diffusifascia Swinhoe, 1892
- Synegiodes histrionaria Swinhoe, 1892
- Synegiodes hyriaria (Walker, 1866)
- Synegiodes obliquifascia Prout, 1918
- Synegiodes sanguinaria (Moore, 1867)
- Sysstema albipicta Warren, 1893)
- Sysstema longiplaga Prout, 1923
- Sysstema semicirculata (Moore, 1867)
- Syzeuxis heteromeces Prout, 1926
- Syzeuxis magnidica Prout, 1926
- Syzeuxis nigrinotata Warren, 1896)
- Syzeuxis seminanis Prout, 1926
- Syzeuxis tessellifimbria Prout, 1926
- Syzeuxis trinotaria (Moore, 1867)
- Tanaoctenia haliaria (Walker, 1861)
- Tanaorrhinus kina Swinhoe, 1893
- Tanaorrhinus kina embrithes Prout, 1934
- Tanaorrhinus rafflesii (Moore, 1859)
- Tanaorrhinus reciprocata Walker, 1861
- Tanaorrhinus viridiluteata (Walker, 1861)
- Tasta micaceata Walker, 1862
- Tasta reflexa Swinhoe, 1902
- Tasta sectinota Hampson, 1895
- Tephrina catalaunaria (Guenée, 1858)
- Tephrina disputaria Guenée, 1858
- Tephrina fumosa Hampson, 1891
- Tephrina perviaria (Lederer, 1855)
- Terpna apicalis (Moore, 1888)
- Terpna costistrigaria (Moore, 1867)
- Terpna crocina (Butler, 1880)
- Terpna differens Warren, 1909
- Terpna dorcada (Swinhoe, 1893)
- Terpna erionoma (Swinhoe, 1893)
- Terpna funebrosa Warren, 1896
- Terpna haemataria Herrich-Schäffer, 1854
- Terpna leopardinata (Moore, 1867)
- Terpna luteipes (Felder, 1875)
- Terpna luteipes ruficosta Hampson, 1891
- Terpna moelleri Warren, 1893)
- Terpna ornataria (Moore, 1888)
- Terpna pictaria (Moore, 1888)
- Terpna subornata Warren, 1894)
- Terpna varicoloraria Moore, 1867
- Terpna vigens (Butler, 1880)
- Thalassodes aptifimbria Prout, 1916
- Thalassodes aucta Prout, 1912
- Thalassodes chloropis Meyrick, 1886
- Thalassodes curiosa Swinhoe, 1902
- Thalassodes dissepta Walker, 1861
- Thalassodes dissita Walker, 1861
- Thalassodes dissitoides Holloway, 1996
- Thalassodes falsaria Prout, 1912
- Thalassodes hypocrites Prout, 1912
- Thalassodes immissaria Walker, 1861
- Thalassodes leucospilota Moore, 1887
- Thalassodes opalina Butler, 1880
- Thalassodes quadraria Guenée, 1857
- Thalassodes veraria Guenée, 1857
- Thalera aeruginata Warren, 1893)
- Thera comis (Butler, 1879)
- Thera comitabilis Prout, 1923
- Thera dentifasciata (Hampson, 1895)
- Thera etes Prout, 1926
- Thera exangulata Warren, 1909)
- Thera undulata Warren, 1880)
- Thinopteryx citrina Warren, 1894
- Thinopteryx crocoptera (Kollar, 1844)
- Thinopteryx nebulosa Butler, 1883
- Thinopteryx praetoraria Felder, 1873
- Timandra amataria griseata (Petersen, 1902)
- Timandra convectaria Warren, 1861
- Timandra correspondens (Hampson, 1895)
- Timandra nelsoni Prout, 1918
- Timandra obsoleta Warren, 1897
- Timandra responsaria Moore, 1888
- Timandra ruptilinea Warren, 1897
- Timandromorpha discolor Warren, 1896)
- Traminda mundissima (Walker, 1861)
- Trichoplites cuprearia (Moore, 1867)
- Trichoplites cuprearia etesias Prout, 1939
- Trichoplites lateritiata (Moore, 1888)
- Trichopterigia decorata Moore, 1888
- Trichopterigia macularia (Moore, 1867)
- Trichopterigia micradelpha Prout, 1958
- Trichopterigia nigrisculpta Warren, 1897)
- Trichopterigia nigronotata Warren, 1893)
- Trichopterigia pilcheri Prout, 1958
- Trichopterigia pulcherrima (Swinhoe, 1893)
- Trichopterigia rivularis Warren, 1893
- Trichopterigia rufinotata (Butler, 1889)
- Trichopterigia sanguinipunctata Warren, 1893)
- Trichopterigia sphenorrhyma Prout, 1926
- Trichopterigia teligera Prout, 1958
- Trichopterigia ustimargo Warren, 1896
- Triphosa acutipennis Warren, 1896
- Triphosa albiplaga (Oberthür, 1887)
- Triphosa confusaria tarachodes Prout, 1941
- Triphosa corrasata Warren, 1897
- Triphosa dubiosata (Walker, 1862)
- Triphosa empodia Prout, 1941
- Triphosa expansa (Moore, 1888)
- Triphosa mnestira Prout, 1938
- Triphosa nigralbata Warren, 1888)
- Triphosa oenozona Prout, 1923
- Triphosa pallescens Warren, 1896
- Triphosa rubrodotata (Walker, 1862)
- Triphosa tremulata (Guenée, 1858)
- Triphosa venimaculata (Moore, 1867)
- Tyloptera bella (Butler, 1878)
- Tyloptera bella taracta Prout, 1958
- Uliocnemis biplagiata (Moore, 1887)
- Uliocnemis partita (Walker, 1861)
- Venusia albinea (Prout, 1938)
- Venusia brevipectinata Prout, 1938
- Venusia lilacina Warren, 1893)
- Venusia lilacina rala Prout, 1938
- Venusia obliquisigna (Moore, 1888)
- Venusia ochrota Hampson, 1903
- Venusia pallidaria Hampson, 1903
- Venusia phasma (Butler, 1879)
- Venusia purpuraria (Hampson, 1895)
- Venusia sikkimensis (Elwes, 1893)
- Viidaleppia consimilis Warren, 1888)
- Vindusara metachromata Walker, 1862
- Vindusara moorei (Thierry-Mieg, 1899)
- Xandrames albofasciata Moore, 1867
- Xandrames dholaria (Moore, 1868)
- Xandrames latiferaria (Walker, 1860)
- Xanthorhoe castanea Warren, 1901
- Xanthorhoe curcumata Moore, 1939
- Xanthorhoe curcumoides (Prout, 1923)
- Xanthorhoe designata Hufnagel, 1767
- Xanthorhoe fumipennis (Hampson, 1891)
- Xanthorhoe griseiviridis (Hampson, 1896)
- Xanthorhoe hampsoni Prout, 1925
- Xanthorhoe magnificata (Walker, 1862)
- Xanthorhoe mecoterma Prout, 1938
- Xanthorhoe molata (Felder, 1875)
- Xanthorhoe saturata (Guenée, 1857)
- Xanthorhoe sordidata (Moore, 1885)
- Xanthorhoe trusa Prout, 1939
- Xenographia adustata (Moore, 1887)
- Xenographia lignataria Warren, 1893
- Xenographia manifesta Warren, 1897
- Xenographia semifusca Hampson, 1895
- Xenortholitha latifusata (Walker, 1862)
- Xenortholitha propinguata (Kollar, 1844)
- Xenortholitha propinguata epigrypa Prout, 1939
- Xenozancla versicolor Warren, 1893
- Xerodes ypsaria Guenée, 1858
- Xeropteryx columbicola (Walker, 1860)
- Zamarada eogenaria (Snellen, 1883)
- Zamarada eogenaria cosmiaria Swinhoe, 1893
- Zamarada excisa Hampson, 1891
- Zamarada minimaria Swinhoe, 1895
- Zamarada symmetra D. S. Fletcher, 1974
- Zamarada translucida Moore, 1887
- Zanclopera falcata Warren, 1894
- Zeheba lucidata Walker, 1866
- Ziridava rubridisca (Hampson, 1891)
- Ziridava rufinigra Swinhoe, 1895
- Ziridava xylinaria (Walker, 1863)
- Ziridava xylinaria khasiensis Prout, 1958
- Zygophyxia conscensa Swinhoe, 1885
- Zygophyxia relictata (Walker, 1866)
- Zythos avellanea (Prout, 1932)
- Zythos turbata (Walker, 1862)

== Related pages ==
- Geometridae
- List of moths of India
