= Plutodes nilgirica =

Scientific classification
- Kingdom: Animalia
- Phylum: Arthropoda
- Class: Insecta
- Order: Lepidoptera
- Family: Geometridae
- Genus: Plutodes
- Species: P. nilgirica

Binomial name
- Plutodes nilgirica Hampson, 1891

Species of moth

Plutodes nilgirica is a species of moth of the family Geometridae found in southern India. It was first described by George Hampson in 1891.

== See also ==
- List of moths of India (Geometridae)
