= Eupithecia tricrossa =

Scientific classification
- Kingdom: Animalia
- Phylum: Arthropoda
- Clade: Pancrustacea
- Class: Insecta
- Order: Lepidoptera
- Family: Geometridae
- Genus: Eupithecia
- Species: E. tricrossa

Binomial name
- Eupithecia tricrossa L.B. Prout, 1926

Synonyms
- Eupithecia multa Vojnits, 1981; Eupithecia suspiciosa Vojnits, 1983

Species of moth

Eupithecia tricrossa is a moth in the family Geometridae. It is found in the southern Himalaya, from Nepal to Tibet, Sikkim, Bhutan, north-eastern India and northern Myanmar.
