= Scopula pulverosa =

Scientific classification
- Domain: Eukaryota
- Kingdom: Animalia
- Phylum: Arthropoda
- Class: Insecta
- Order: Lepidoptera
- Family: Geometridae
- Genus: Scopula
- Species: S. pulverosa

Binomial name
- Scopula pulverosa Prout, 1934

Synonyms
- Scopula straminea Prout, 1926 (preocc. Felder, 1875)

Species of geometer moth in subfamily Sterrhinae

Scopula pulverosa is a moth of the family Geometridae. It is found in India.
