= Scopula albomaculata =

Scientific classification
- Domain: Eukaryota
- Kingdom: Animalia
- Phylum: Arthropoda
- Class: Insecta
- Order: Lepidoptera
- Family: Geometridae
- Genus: Scopula
- Species: S. albomaculata

Binomial name
- Scopula albomaculata (Moore, 1888)

Synonyms
- Idaea albomaculata Moore, 1888

Species of geometer moth in subfamily Sterrhinae

Scopula albomaculata is a moth of the family Geometridae. It was described by Frederic Moore in 1888. It is found in northern India.
