= Eupithecia albispumata =

Scientific classification
- Domain: Eukaryota
- Kingdom: Animalia
- Phylum: Arthropoda
- Class: Insecta
- Order: Lepidoptera
- Family: Geometridae
- Genus: Eupithecia
- Species: E. albispumata

Binomial name
- Eupithecia albispumata Warren, 1893

Synonyms
- Eupithecia pengata Schütze, 1961; Eupithecia acseszteri Vojnits, 1988

Species of moth

Eupithecia albispumata is a moth in the family Geometridae. It is found from the southern and western Himalaya (Nepal and Assam) to southern China (Yunnan) and northern Myanmar.
