= Scopula sordida =

Scientific classification
- Domain: Eukaryota
- Kingdom: Animalia
- Phylum: Arthropoda
- Class: Insecta
- Order: Lepidoptera
- Family: Geometridae
- Genus: Scopula
- Species: S. sordida

Binomial name
- Scopula sordida (Warren, 1895)

Synonyms
- Craspedia sordida Warren, 1895; Craspedia sordida ab. multiscriptata Warren, 1895

Species of geometer moth in subfamily Sterrhinae

Scopula sordida is a moth of the family Geometridae. It is found in India (the Nilgiri Hills). Description of the moth was given by W. Warren in 1895. No subspecies are mentioned.
