= Scopula kashmirensis =

Scientific classification
- Domain: Eukaryota
- Kingdom: Animalia
- Phylum: Arthropoda
- Class: Insecta
- Order: Lepidoptera
- Family: Geometridae
- Genus: Scopula
- Species: S. kashmirensis

Binomial name
- Scopula kashmirensis (Moore, 1888)

Synonyms
- Craspedia kashmirensis Moore, 1888

Species of geometer moth in subfamily Sterrhinae

Scopula kashmirensis is a moth of the family Geometridae. It was described by Frederic Moore in 1888. It is found in India (Kashmir).

== Subspecies ==
- Scopula kashmirensis kashmirensis
- Scopula kashmirensis gooraisensis Prout, 1935
- Scopula kashmirensis quettensis Prout, 1935
