= Scopula violacea =

Scientific classification
- Domain: Eukaryota
- Kingdom: Animalia
- Phylum: Arthropoda
- Class: Insecta
- Order: Lepidoptera
- Family: Geometridae
- Genus: Scopula
- Species: S. violacea

Binomial name
- Scopula violacea (Warren, 1897)

Synonyms
- Triorisma violacea Warren, 1897

Species of geometer moth in subfamily Sterrhinae

Scopula violacea is a moth of the family Geometridae. It is found in India (Sikkim).
