= Eupithecia fletcheri =

Scientific classification
- Kingdom: Animalia
- Phylum: Arthropoda
- Clade: Pancrustacea
- Class: Insecta
- Order: Lepidoptera
- Family: Geometridae
- Genus: Eupithecia
- Species: E. fletcheri

Binomial name
- Eupithecia fletcheri Prout, 1926

Synonyms
- Eupithecia fletcheri f. hypognampta Prout, 1938; Eupithecia hypognampta

Species of moth

Eupithecia fletcheri is a moth in the family Geometridae. It is found in India and Pakistan.
