= Scopula idearia =

Scientific classification
- Domain: Eukaryota
- Kingdom: Animalia
- Phylum: Arthropoda
- Class: Insecta
- Order: Lepidoptera
- Family: Geometridae
- Genus: Scopula
- Species: S. idearia

Binomial name
- Scopula idearia (C. Swinhoe, 1886)

Synonyms
- Idaea idearia C. Swinhoe, 1886

Species of geometer moth in subfamily Sterrhinae

Scopula idearia is a moth of the family Geometridae. It is found in Pakistan.
