= Petelia immaculata =

Scientific classification
- Kingdom: Animalia
- Phylum: Arthropoda
- Clade: Pancrustacea
- Class: Insecta
- Order: Lepidoptera
- Family: Geometridae
- Genus: Petelia
- Species: P. immaculata

Binomial name
- Petelia immaculata Hampson, 1893

Species of moth

Petelia immaculata is a moth of the family Geometridae first described by George Hampson in 1893. It is found in India and Sri Lanka.
