= Scopula atriceps =

Scientific classification
- Domain: Eukaryota
- Kingdom: Animalia
- Phylum: Arthropoda
- Class: Insecta
- Order: Lepidoptera
- Family: Geometridae
- Genus: Scopula
- Species: S. atriceps

Binomial name
- Scopula atriceps (Hampson, 1895)

Synonyms
- Craspedia atriceps Hampson, 1895

Species of geometer moth in subfamily Sterrhinae

Scopula atriceps is a moth of the family Geometridae. It was described by George Hampson in 1895. It is found in Himachal Pradesh, India.
