= Ruttelerona cessaria =

Scientific classification
- Kingdom: Animalia
- Phylum: Arthropoda
- Clade: Pancrustacea
- Class: Insecta
- Order: Lepidoptera
- Family: Geometridae
- Genus: Ruttelerona
- Species: R. cessaria

Binomial name
- Ruttelerona cessaria (Walker, 1860)

Synonyms
- Boarmia cessaria Walker, 1860

Species of moth

Ruttelerona cessaria is a moth of the family Geometridae first described by Francis Walker in 1860. It is found in Sri Lanka and South India.
