= Eupithecia conjunctiva =

Scientific classification
- Kingdom: Animalia
- Phylum: Arthropoda
- Class: Insecta
- Order: Lepidoptera
- Family: Geometridae
- Genus: Eupithecia
- Species: E. conjunctiva

Binomial name
- Eupithecia conjunctiva Hampson, 1895

Species of moth

Eupithecia conjunctiva is a moth in the family Geometridae. The moth is found in Afghanistan, northern Pakistan, Jammu and Kashmir, and northern India (Punjab and Sikkim), and Nepal. It is found at altitudes between 1,100 and 3,000 meters.
