= Eupithecia ochracea =

Scientific classification
- Kingdom: Animalia
- Phylum: Arthropoda
- Class: Insecta
- Order: Lepidoptera
- Family: Geometridae
- Genus: Eupithecia
- Species: E. ochracea

Binomial name
- Eupithecia ochracea (Warren, 1888)

Synonyms
- Asthena ochracea Warren, 1888; Eupithecia nova Vojnits, 1974

Species of moth

Eupithecia ochracea is a moth in the family Geometridae. It is found from India and Pakistan to south-west China.
