= Scopula achrosta =

Scientific classification
- Domain: Eukaryota
- Kingdom: Animalia
- Phylum: Arthropoda
- Class: Insecta
- Order: Lepidoptera
- Family: Geometridae
- Genus: Scopula
- Species: S. achrosta

Binomial name
- Scopula achrosta Prout, 1936

Species of geometer moths in subfamily Sterrhinae

Scopula achrosta is a moth of the family Geometridae. It was described by Prout in 1935. It is found in Kashmir.
