= Eupithecia lineosa =

Scientific classification
- Kingdom: Animalia
- Phylum: Arthropoda
- Class: Insecta
- Order: Lepidoptera
- Family: Geometridae
- Genus: Eupithecia
- Species: E. lineosa

Binomial name
- Eupithecia lineosa Moore, 1888

Synonyms
- Eupithecia lineosa gulmargensis Prout, 1938

Species of moth

Eupithecia lineosa is a moth in the family Geometridae. It is found in India (Kashmir), Nepal and Pakistan.
