= Scopula cleoraria =

Scientific classification
- Domain: Eukaryota
- Kingdom: Animalia
- Phylum: Arthropoda
- Class: Insecta
- Order: Lepidoptera
- Family: Geometridae
- Genus: Scopula
- Species: S. cleoraria

Binomial name
- Scopula cleoraria (Walker, 1861)

Synonyms
- Acidalia cleoraria Walker 1861; Acidalia effrenata Walker 1863

Species of geometer moth in subfamily Sterrhinae

Scopula cleoraria is a moth of the family Geometridae. It was described by Francis Walker in 1861. It is found in India, Bhutan and Afghanistan.

== Subspecies ==
- Scopula cleoraria cleoraria (north-western India)
- Scopula cleoraria effrenata (Walker 1863) (Bhutan)
