= Eupithecia irambata =

Scientific classification
- Domain: Eukaryota
- Kingdom: Animalia
- Phylum: Arthropoda
- Class: Insecta
- Order: Lepidoptera
- Family: Geometridae
- Genus: Eupithecia
- Species: E. irambata

Binomial name
- Eupithecia irambata (Warren, 1893)

Synonyms
- Eurypeplodes irambata Warren, 1893

Species of moth

Eupithecia irambata is a moth in the family Geometridae. It is found in India (Sikkim).
