= Eupithecia albibaltea =

Scientific classification
- Kingdom: Animalia
- Phylum: Arthropoda
- Clade: Pancrustacea
- Class: Insecta
- Order: Lepidoptera
- Family: Geometridae
- Genus: Eupithecia
- Species: E. albibaltea

Binomial name
- Eupithecia albibaltea Prout, 1958

Species of moth

Eupithecia albibaltea is a moth in the family Geometridae. It is found in north-eastern India and Sikkim.
