= Scopula patularia =

Scientific classification
- Kingdom: Animalia
- Phylum: Arthropoda
- Class: Insecta
- Order: Lepidoptera
- Family: Geometridae
- Genus: Scopula
- Species: S. patularia

Binomial name
- Scopula patularia (Walker, 1866)

Synonyms
- Acidalia patularia Walker, 1866; Trichoclada opsinaria Swinhoe, 1892

Species of geometer moth in subfamily Sterrhinae

Scopula patularia is a moth of the family Geometridae. It is found in India.
