= Abraxas irrorata =

Scientific classification
- Kingdom: Animalia
- Phylum: Arthropoda
- Clade: Pancrustacea
- Class: Insecta
- Order: Lepidoptera
- Family: Geometridae
- Genus: Abraxas
- Species: A. irrorata

Binomial name
- Abraxas irrorata Moore, 1867

Synonyms
- Abraxas diaphana Warren, 1893

Species of moth

Abraxas irrorata is a species of moth belonging to the family Geometridae. It was first described in 1867 by British entomologist Frederic Moore. It is known from Darjeeling, Sikkim and Arunachal Pradesh, India.
