= Eupithecia rajata =

Scientific classification
- Kingdom: Animalia
- Phylum: Arthropoda
- Class: Insecta
- Order: Lepidoptera
- Family: Geometridae
- Genus: Eupithecia
- Species: E. rajata

Binomial name
- Eupithecia rajata Guenée, 1858

Synonyms
- Eupithecia apparticeps Inoue, 2000

Species of moth

Eupithecia rajata is a moth in the family Geometridae. It is found from the southern Himalaya (including Nepal, Pakistan and India) to south-western China (Yunnan), Myanmar and Thailand.
