= Eupithecia asema =

Scientific classification
- Kingdom: Animalia
- Phylum: Arthropoda
- Class: Insecta
- Order: Lepidoptera
- Family: Geometridae
- Genus: Eupithecia
- Species: E. asema

Binomial name
- Eupithecia asema Hampson, 1859

Species of moth

Eupithecia asema is a moth in the family Geometridae. It is found in southern India (Nilgiri Hills).
