= Scopula linearia =

Scientific classification
- Kingdom: Animalia
- Phylum: Arthropoda
- Class: Insecta
- Order: Lepidoptera
- Family: Geometridae
- Genus: Scopula
- Species: S. linearia

Binomial name
- Scopula linearia (Hampson, 1891)

Synonyms
- Craspedia linearia Hampson, 1891; Scopula linearis

Species of geometer moth in subfamily Sterrhinae

Scopula linearia is a moth of the family Geometridae. It is found in India (the Nilgiri mountains).
