= Scopula dimoera =

Scientific classification
- Domain: Eukaryota
- Kingdom: Animalia
- Phylum: Arthropoda
- Class: Insecta
- Order: Lepidoptera
- Family: Geometridae
- Genus: Scopula
- Species: S. dimoera

Binomial name
- Scopula dimoera Prout, 1922

Species of geometer moth in subfamily Sterrhinae

Scopula dimoera is a moth of the family Geometridae. It was described by Prout in 1922, and is found in southern India.
