= Scopula atridiscata =

Scientific classification
- Domain: Eukaryota
- Kingdom: Animalia
- Phylum: Arthropoda
- Class: Insecta
- Order: Lepidoptera
- Family: Geometridae
- Genus: Scopula
- Species: S. atridiscata

Binomial name
- Scopula atridiscata (Warren, 1897)

Synonyms
- Craspedia atridiscata Warren 1897

Species of geometer moth in subfamily Sterrhinae

Scopula atridiscata is a moth of the family Geometridae. It was described by Warren in 1897. It is found in India (the Khasi Hills).
