= Eupithecia costipicta =

Scientific classification
- Kingdom: Animalia
- Phylum: Arthropoda
- Clade: Pancrustacea
- Class: Insecta
- Order: Lepidoptera
- Family: Geometridae
- Genus: Eupithecia
- Species: E. costipicta

Binomial name
- Eupithecia costipicta Warren, 1893

Synonyms
- Eupithecia gibbosa Mironov & Galsworthy, 2004

Species of moth

Eupithecia costipicta is a moth in the family Geometridae. It is found in Afghanistan, northern India (Jammu and Kashmir, Sikkim), Nepal, and central China (Hubei, Hunan). The habitat consists of mountainous areas at altitudes between 2,300 and 3,500 meters.

The wingspan is about 22.5 mm.
