= Scopula butyrosa =

Scientific classification
- Domain: Eukaryota
- Kingdom: Animalia
- Phylum: Arthropoda
- Class: Insecta
- Order: Lepidoptera
- Family: Geometridae
- Genus: Scopula
- Species: S. butyrosa

Binomial name
- Scopula butyrosa (Warren, 1893)

Synonyms
- Idaea butyrosa Warren, 1893

Species of geometer moth in subfamily Sterrhinae

Scopula butyrosa is a moth of the family Geometridae. It was described by Warren in 1893. It is found in India (Sikkim).
