= Scopula unilineata =

Scientific classification
- Domain: Eukaryota
- Kingdom: Animalia
- Phylum: Arthropoda
- Class: Insecta
- Order: Lepidoptera
- Family: Geometridae
- Genus: Scopula
- Species: S. unilineata

Binomial name
- Scopula unilineata (Warren, 1896)

Synonyms
- Ptychopoda unilineata Warren, 1896

Species of geometer moth in subfamily Sterrhinae

Scopula unilineata is a moth of the family Geometridae. It is found in India (the Khasia Hills).
