= Eupithecia subrubescens =

Scientific classification
- Kingdom: Animalia
- Phylum: Arthropoda
- Class: Insecta
- Order: Lepidoptera
- Family: Geometridae
- Genus: Eupithecia
- Species: E. subrubescens

Binomial name
- Eupithecia subrubescens (Warren, 1888)

Synonyms
- Cideria subrubescens Warren, 1888; Horisma subrubescens; Melanippe despicienda Butler, 1889

Species of moth

Eupithecia subrubescens is a moth in the family Geometridae. It is found in India (Himachal Pradesh, Punjab), Pakistan (Kohistan), Jammu & Kashmir and Nepal.
