= Scopula flavifurfurata =

Scientific classification
- Domain: Eukaryota
- Kingdom: Animalia
- Phylum: Arthropoda
- Class: Insecta
- Order: Lepidoptera
- Family: Geometridae
- Genus: Scopula
- Species: S. flavifurfurata

Binomial name
- Scopula flavifurfurata Prout, 1920

Species of geometer moth in subfamily Sterrhinae

Scopula flavifurfurata is a moth of the family Geometridae. It was described by Prout in 1920. It is found in India (Punjab).
