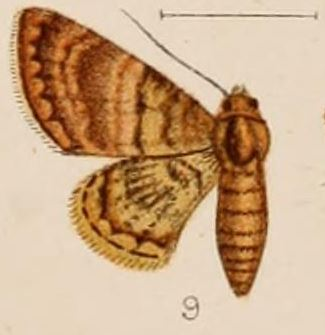

Scientific classification
- Domain: Eukaryota
- Kingdom: Animalia
- Phylum: Arthropoda
- Class: Insecta
- Order: Lepidoptera
- Family: Geometridae
- Genus: Hybridoneura
- Species: H. abnormis

Binomial name
- Hybridoneura abnormis Warren, 1898

Synonyms
- Hybridoneura lativitra Prout, 1958; Neoscelis metachlora Hampson, 1907; Hybridoneura metachlora

= Hybridoneura abnormis =

Species of moth

Hybridoneura abnormis is a moth in the family Geometridae. It is found in the north-eastern Himalayas, Sri Lanka, Sundaland and on Sulawesi. The habitat consists of mixed dipterocarp forests, as well as lower montane forests.

This species has a wingspan of 24mm.
