= Scopula albiflava =

Scientific classification
- Domain: Eukaryota
- Kingdom: Animalia
- Phylum: Arthropoda
- Class: Insecta
- Order: Lepidoptera
- Family: Geometridae
- Genus: Scopula
- Species: S. albiflava

Binomial name
- Scopula albiflava (Warren, 1896)

Synonyms
- Ptychopoda albiflava Warren, 1896

Species of geometer moth in subfamily Sterrhinae

Scopula albiflava is a moth of the family Geometridae. It was described by Warren by 1896. It is found in India (Assam).
