= Eupithecia ustata =

Scientific classification
- Kingdom: Animalia
- Phylum: Arthropoda
- Class: Insecta
- Order: Lepidoptera
- Family: Geometridae
- Genus: Eupithecia
- Species: E. ustata

Binomial name
- Eupithecia ustata Moore, 1888

Synonyms
- Eupithecia delaeveri Vojnits, 1976

Species of moth

Eupithecia ustata is a moth in the family Geometridae. It is found in India (Sikkim, Punjab), Kashmir and China (Yunnan).
