= Eupithecia lucigera =

Scientific classification
- Kingdom: Animalia
- Phylum: Arthropoda
- Class: Insecta
- Order: Lepidoptera
- Family: Geometridae
- Genus: Eupithecia
- Species: E. lucigera

Binomial name
- Eupithecia lucigera Butler, 1889

Species of moth

Eupithecia lucigera is a moth in the family Geometridae. It is found from the western Himalayas to southern China.
