= Eupithecia garuda =

Scientific classification
- Kingdom: Animalia
- Phylum: Arthropoda
- Clade: Pancrustacea
- Class: Insecta
- Order: Lepidoptera
- Family: Geometridae
- Genus: Eupithecia
- Species: E. garuda

Binomial name
- Eupithecia garuda Galsworthy & Mironov, 2005

Species of moth

Eupithecia garuda is a moth in the family Geometridae. It is found in Nepal, India (West Bengal), Laos and Thailand.

The wingspan is about 16.5 mm.
