= Scopula polystigmaria =

Scientific classification
- Kingdom: Animalia
- Phylum: Arthropoda
- Class: Insecta
- Order: Lepidoptera
- Family: Geometridae
- Genus: Scopula
- Species: S. polystigmaria

Binomial name
- Scopula polystigmaria (Hampson, 1903)

Synonyms
- Craspedia polystigmaria Hampson, 1903; Emmiltis elyra Swinhoe, 1905

Species of geometer moth in subfamily Sterrhinae

Scopula polystigmaria is a moth of the family Geometridae. It is found in Kashmir.
