= Eupithecia incurvaria =

Scientific classification
- Kingdom: Animalia
- Phylum: Arthropoda
- Class: Insecta
- Order: Lepidoptera
- Family: Geometridae
- Genus: Eupithecia
- Species: E. incurvaria

Binomial name
- Eupithecia incurvaria Hampson, 1903

Synonyms
- Eupithecia propoxydata Schütze, 1961

Species of moth

Eupithecia incurvaria is a moth in the family Geometridae. It is found in Afghanistan, northern Pakistan, Jammu & Kashmir, Nepal and India (Sikkim). It is found at altitudes between 1,400 and 3,500 meters.
