= Scopula nigridentata =

Scientific classification
- Domain: Eukaryota
- Kingdom: Animalia
- Phylum: Arthropoda
- Class: Insecta
- Order: Lepidoptera
- Family: Geometridae
- Genus: Scopula
- Species: S. nigridentata

Binomial name
- Scopula nigridentata (Warren, 1896)

Synonyms
- Craspedia nigridentata Warren, 1896

Species of geometer moth in subfamily Sterrhinae

Scopula nigridentata is a moth of the family Geometridae. It is found in India (the Khasia Hills).
