= Scopula deliciosaria =

Scientific classification
- Kingdom: Animalia
- Phylum: Arthropoda
- Class: Insecta
- Order: Lepidoptera
- Family: Geometridae
- Genus: Scopula
- Species: S. deliciosaria

Binomial name
- Scopula deliciosaria (Walker, 1861)

Synonyms
- Acidalia deliciosaria Walker, 1861

Species of geometer moth in subfamily Sterrhinae

Scopula deliciosaria is a moth of the family Geometridae. It is found in India.
