= Eupithecia fulvipennis =

Scientific classification
- Kingdom: Animalia
- Phylum: Arthropoda
- Class: Insecta
- Order: Lepidoptera
- Family: Geometridae
- Genus: Eupithecia
- Species: E. fulvipennis

Binomial name
- Eupithecia fulvipennis Butler, 1889

Synonyms
- Eupithecia uniformis Inoue, 2000

Species of moth

Eupithecia fulvipennis is a moth in the family Geometridae. It is found in India and Nepal.
