= Eupithecia acutangula =

Scientific classification
- Kingdom: Animalia
- Phylum: Arthropoda
- Class: Insecta
- Order: Lepidoptera
- Family: Geometridae
- Genus: Eupithecia
- Species: E. acutangula

Binomial name
- Eupithecia acutangula Hampson, 1895

Species of geometer moth

Eupithecia acutangula is a moth of the family Geometridae first described by George Hampson in 1895. It is found in Pakistan and India.

There are at least two generations per year.
