= Scopula moorei =

Scientific classification
- Domain: Eukaryota
- Kingdom: Animalia
- Phylum: Arthropoda
- Class: Insecta
- Order: Lepidoptera
- Family: Geometridae
- Genus: Scopula
- Species: S. moorei

Binomial name
- Scopula moorei (Cotes & Swinhoe, 1888)

Synonyms
- Anisodes moorei Cotes & Swinhoe, 1888; Anisodes similaria Moore, 1868 (preocc.)

Species of geometer moth in subfamily Sterrhinae

Scopula moorei is a moth of the family Geometridae. It is found in India.

== Subspecies ==
- Scopula moorei moorei
- Scopula moorei metarsia Prout, 1938
