= Scopula hyphenophora =

Scientific classification
- Domain: Eukaryota
- Kingdom: Animalia
- Phylum: Arthropoda
- Class: Insecta
- Order: Lepidoptera
- Family: Geometridae
- Genus: Scopula
- Species: S. hyphenophora

Binomial name
- Scopula hyphenophora (Warren, 1896)

Synonyms
- Craspedia hyphenophora Warren, 1896

Species of geometer moth in subfamily Sterrhinae

Scopula hyphenophora is a moth of the family Geometridae. It is found in India, Peninsular Malaysia and on Borneo and Bali. The habitat consists of lowland primary and secondary forests, alluvial forests and forests on limestone.

== Subspecies ==
- Scopula hyphenophora hyphenophora (north-eastern Himalaya)
- Scopula hyphenophora ambiguiceps Prout, 1938 (Peninsular Malaysia, Borneo, Bali)
