= Scopula coangulata =

Scientific classification
- Domain: Eukaryota
- Kingdom: Animalia
- Phylum: Arthropoda
- Class: Insecta
- Order: Lepidoptera
- Family: Geometridae
- Genus: Scopula
- Species: S. coangulata

Binomial name
- Scopula coangulata Prout, 1920

Species of geometer moth in subfamily Sterrhinae

Scopula coangulata is a moth of the family Geometridae. It was described by Prout in 1920. It is found in India (Assam).
