= Eupithecia robiginascens =

Scientific classification
- Kingdom: Animalia
- Phylum: Arthropoda
- Clade: Pancrustacea
- Class: Insecta
- Order: Lepidoptera
- Family: Geometridae
- Genus: Eupithecia
- Species: E. robiginascens

Binomial name
- Eupithecia robiginascens L.B. Prout, 1926

Synonyms
- Eupithecia captiosa Vojnits, 1984

Species of moth

Eupithecia robiginascens is a moth in the family Geometridae. It is found from the southern and western Himalaya (Pakistan, Jammu and Kashmir, Nepal, India (Himachal Pradesh, Uttar Pradesh, Sikkim) and Bhutan) to southern China (Sichuan, Yunnan) and northern Myanmar.
