= Scopula stigmata =

Scientific classification
- Domain: Eukaryota
- Kingdom: Animalia
- Phylum: Arthropoda
- Class: Insecta
- Order: Lepidoptera
- Family: Geometridae
- Genus: Scopula
- Species: S. stigmata

Binomial name
- Scopula stigmata (Moore, 1888)

Synonyms
- Craspedia stigmata Moore, 1888

Species of geometer moth in subfamily Sterrhinae

Scopula stigmata is a moth of the family Geometridae. It is found in north-western India.
