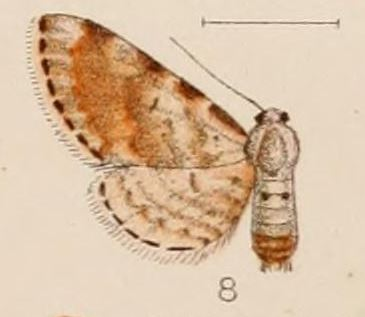

Scientific classification
- Kingdom: Animalia
- Phylum: Arthropoda
- Class: Insecta
- Order: Lepidoptera
- Family: Geometridae
- Genus: Eupithecia
- Species: E. albifurva

Binomial name
- Eupithecia albifurva Hampson, 1907

= Eupithecia albifurva =

Species of moth

Eupithecia albifurva is a moth in the family Geometridae. It is found in Sri Lanka.
