= Scopula annularia =

Scientific classification
- Domain: Eukaryota
- Kingdom: Animalia
- Phylum: Arthropoda
- Class: Insecta
- Order: Lepidoptera
- Family: Geometridae
- Genus: Scopula
- Species: S. annularia

Binomial name
- Scopula annularia (C. Swinhoe, 1890)

Synonyms
- Lycauges annularia C. Swinhoe, 1890; Acidalia nigropunctata Guenée, 1858

Species of geometer moth in subfamily Sterrhinae

Scopula annularia is a moth of the family Geometridae first described by Charles Swinhoe in 1890. It is found from the north-eastern Himalayas to Hong Kong, Myanmar, Sumatra, Borneo, Java, the Philippines, Sulawesi and Seram.

== Subspecies ==
- Scopula annularia annularia (Myanmar, ...)
- Scopula annularia reducta Rothschild, 1920 (Sumatra, ...)
