= Scopula annexata =

Scientific classification
- Domain: Eukaryota
- Kingdom: Animalia
- Phylum: Arthropoda
- Class: Insecta
- Order: Lepidoptera
- Family: Geometridae
- Genus: Scopula
- Species: S. annexata

Binomial name
- Scopula annexata Prout, 1938

Species of geometer moth in subfamily Sterrhinae

Scopula annexata is a moth of the family Geometridae. It was described by Prout in 1938. It is found in India (Nilgiris).
