= Eupithecia latimedia =

Scientific classification
- Kingdom: Animalia
- Phylum: Arthropoda
- Class: Insecta
- Order: Lepidoptera
- Family: Geometridae
- Genus: Eupithecia
- Species: E. latimedia

Binomial name
- Eupithecia latimedia Hampson, 1895

Species of moth

Eupithecia latimedia is a moth in the family Geometridae. It is found in India (Dalhousie) and Nepal.
