= Eupithecia anasticta =

Scientific classification
- Kingdom: Animalia
- Phylum: Arthropoda
- Clade: Pancrustacea
- Class: Insecta
- Order: Lepidoptera
- Family: Geometridae
- Genus: Eupithecia
- Species: E. anasticta

Binomial name
- Eupithecia anasticta L.B. Prout, 1926

Species of moth

Eupithecia anasticta is a moth in the family Geometridae. It is found in northern Myanmar, India (Sikkim) and Laos.
