= Eois memorata =

Scientific classification
- Kingdom: Animalia
- Phylum: Arthropoda
- Clade: Pancrustacea
- Class: Insecta
- Order: Lepidoptera
- Family: Geometridae
- Genus: Eois
- Species: E. memorata

Binomial name
- Eois memorata (Walker, 1861)

Synonyms
- Pomasia memorata Walker, 1861; Anisodes rapistriaria Swinhoe, 1890

Species of moth

Eois memorata is a moth in the family Geometridae. It is found from the Indian subregion to Sundaland. The habitat consists of lowland areas, usually disturbed or secondary forests.
