= Scopula bispurcata =

Scientific classification
- Domain: Eukaryota
- Kingdom: Animalia
- Phylum: Arthropoda
- Class: Insecta
- Order: Lepidoptera
- Family: Geometridae
- Genus: Scopula
- Species: S. bispurcata

Binomial name
- Scopula bispurcata (Warren, 1898)

Synonyms
- Craspedia bispurcata Warren, 1898

Species of geometer moth in subfamily Sterrhinae

Scopula bispurcata is a moth of the family Geometridae. It was described by Warren in 1898. It is found in India (Assam).
