= Petelia capitata =

Scientific classification
- Kingdom: Animalia
- Phylum: Arthropoda
- Class: Insecta
- Order: Lepidoptera
- Family: Geometridae
- Genus: Petelia
- Species: P. capitata

Binomial name
- Petelia capitata Walker, 1867

Synonyms
- Astygisa waterstradti; Petelia metaspila Walker sensu Holloway, 1976

Species of moth

Petelia capitata is a moth of the family Geometridae first described by Francis Walker in 1867. It is found in Borneo.

Sexes show sexual dimorphism. The wingspan of male is 11 mm, and the female's is 17 mm. The wings are maroon red with variable white markings.
