= Scopula extimaria =

Scientific classification
- Kingdom: Animalia
- Phylum: Arthropoda
- Class: Insecta
- Order: Lepidoptera
- Family: Geometridae
- Genus: Scopula
- Species: S. extimaria

Binomial name
- Scopula extimaria (Walker, 1861)

Synonyms
- Acidalia extimaria Walker, 1861

Species of geometer moth in subfamily Sterrhinae

Scopula extimaria is a moth of the family Geometridae. It is found in northern India.
