= Scopula furfurata =

Scientific classification
- Kingdom: Animalia
- Phylum: Arthropoda
- Clade: Pancrustacea
- Class: Insecta
- Order: Lepidoptera
- Family: Geometridae
- Genus: Scopula
- Species: S. furfurata

Binomial name
- Scopula furfurata (Warren, 1897)

Synonyms
- Craspedia furfurata Warren, 1897

Species of geometer moth in subfamily Sterrhinae

Scopula furfurata is a moth of the family Geometridae. It was described by Warren in 1897. It is found in India (Simla).
