= Eupithecia interrubrescens =

Scientific classification
- Kingdom: Animalia
- Phylum: Arthropoda
- Class: Insecta
- Order: Lepidoptera
- Family: Geometridae
- Genus: Eupithecia
- Species: E. interrubrescens

Binomial name
- Eupithecia interrubrescens (Hampson, 1902)

Synonyms
- Phibalapteryx interrubrescens Hampson, 1902

Species of moth

Eupithecia interrubrescens is a moth in the family Geometridae. It is found in Tibet.
