= Scopula jacta =

Scientific classification
- Domain: Eukaryota
- Kingdom: Animalia
- Phylum: Arthropoda
- Class: Insecta
- Order: Lepidoptera
- Family: Geometridae
- Genus: Scopula
- Species: S. jacta

Binomial name
- Scopula jacta (C. Swinhoe, 1885)

Synonyms
- Idaea jacta C. Swinhoe, 1885; Glossotrophia jacta

Species of geometer moth in subfamily Sterrhinae

Scopula jacta is a moth of the family Geometridae. It was described by Charles Swinhoe in 1885. It is found in Yemen and Pakistan.
