= Scopula celebraria =

Scientific classification
- Domain: Eukaryota
- Kingdom: Animalia
- Phylum: Arthropoda
- Class: Insecta
- Order: Lepidoptera
- Family: Geometridae
- Genus: Scopula
- Species: S. celebraria

Binomial name
- Scopula celebraria (Walker, 1861)

Synonyms
- Acidalia celebraria Walker, 1861

Species of geometer moth in subfamily Sterrhinae

Scopula celebraria is a moth of the family Geometridae. It was described by Francis Walker in 1861. It is found in southern India.
