= Scopula albivertex =

Scientific classification
- Domain: Eukaryota
- Kingdom: Animalia
- Phylum: Arthropoda
- Class: Insecta
- Order: Lepidoptera
- Family: Geometridae
- Genus: Scopula
- Species: S. albivertex

Binomial name
- Scopula albivertex (C. Swinhoe, 1892)

Synonyms
- Idaea albivertex C. Swinhoe, 1892; Epicosymbia albivertex; Semaeopus ancillaria Warren, 1895

Species of geometer moth in subfamily Sterrhinae

Scopula albivertex is a moth of the family Geometridae. It was described by Charles Swinhoe in 1892. It is endemic to India.

== Subspecies ==
- Scopula albivertex albivertex
- Scopula albivertex ancillaria (Warren, 1895)
