= Eupithecia acolpodes =

Scientific classification
- Kingdom: Animalia
- Phylum: Arthropoda
- Clade: Pancrustacea
- Class: Insecta
- Order: Lepidoptera
- Family: Geometridae
- Genus: Eupithecia
- Species: E. acolpodes

Binomial name
- Eupithecia acolpodes Prout, 1938

Species of geometer moth

Eupithecia acolpodes is a moth in the family Geometridae. It is found in India and Pakistan. Vladimir Mironov and Anthony Galsworthy place the species as part of the sinuosaria species group.
