= Eupithecia leucospila =

Scientific classification
- Domain: Eukaryota
- Kingdom: Animalia
- Phylum: Arthropoda
- Class: Insecta
- Order: Lepidoptera
- Family: Geometridae
- Genus: Eupithecia
- Species: E. leucospila

Binomial name
- Eupithecia leucospila (C. Swinhoe, 1906)

Synonyms
- Tephroclystia leucospila C. Swinhoe, 1906

Species of moth

Eupithecia leucospila is a moth in the family Geometridae first described by Charles Swinhoe in 1906. It is found in the Indian state of Assam and in Thailand.
