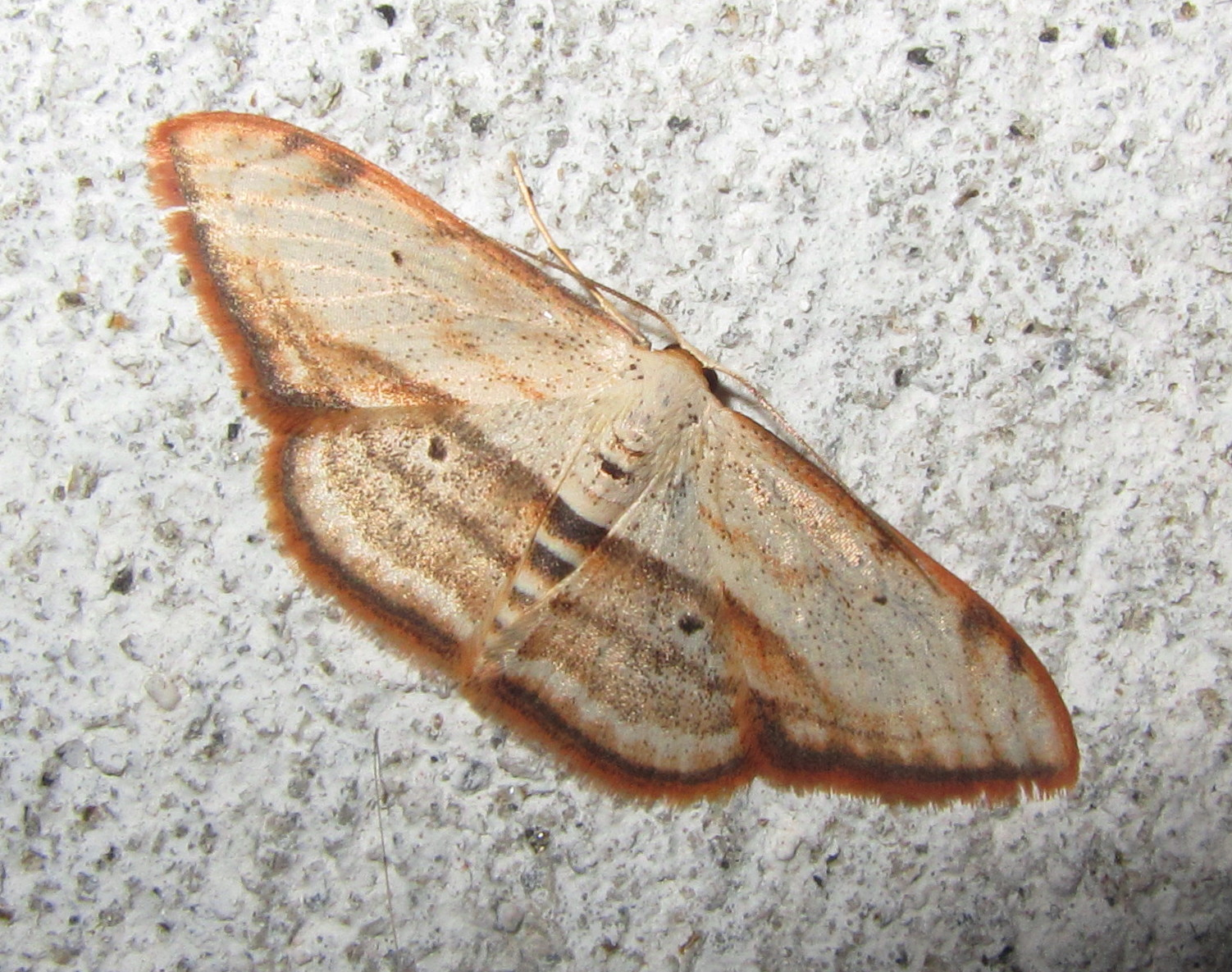

Scientific classification
- Domain: Eukaryota
- Kingdom: Animalia
- Phylum: Arthropoda
- Class: Insecta
- Order: Lepidoptera
- Family: Geometridae
- Genus: Scopula
- Species: S. ferrilineata

Binomial name
- Scopula ferrilineata (Moore, 1888)

Synonyms
- Runeca ferrilineata Moore, 1888

= Scopula ferrilineata =

Species of geometer moth in subfamily Sterrhinae

Scopula ferrilineata is a moth of the family Geometridae. It was described by Frederic Moore in 1888. It is found in Darjeeling, India.
