= Scopula erubescens =

Scientific classification
- Domain: Eukaryota
- Kingdom: Animalia
- Phylum: Arthropoda
- Class: Insecta
- Order: Lepidoptera
- Family: Geometridae
- Genus: Scopula
- Species: S. erubescens

Binomial name
- Scopula erubescens (Warren, 1895)

Synonyms
- Craspedia erubescens Warren, 1895

Species of geometer moth in subfamily Sterrhinae

Scopula erubescens is a moth of the family Geometridae. It is found in India (Khasia Hills).
