= Eupithecia biviridata =

Scientific classification
- Domain: Eukaryota
- Kingdom: Animalia
- Phylum: Arthropoda
- Class: Insecta
- Order: Lepidoptera
- Family: Geometridae
- Genus: Eupithecia
- Species: E. biviridata

Binomial name
- Eupithecia biviridata (Warren, 1896)

Synonyms
- Tephroclystia biviridata Warren, 1896

Species of moth

Eupithecia biviridata is a moth in the family Geometridae. It is found in the Himalaya.
