= Scopula rufistigma =

Scientific classification
- Domain: Eukaryota
- Kingdom: Animalia
- Phylum: Arthropoda
- Class: Insecta
- Order: Lepidoptera
- Family: Geometridae
- Genus: Scopula
- Species: S. rufistigma

Binomial name
- Scopula rufistigma (Warren, 1895)

Synonyms
- Craspedia rufistigma Warren, 1895

Species of geometer moth in subfamily Sterrhinae

Scopula rufistigma is a moth of the family Geometridae. It is found in India (Assam).
