= Scopula inangulata =

Scientific classification
- Domain: Eukaryota
- Kingdom: Animalia
- Phylum: Arthropoda
- Class: Insecta
- Order: Lepidoptera
- Family: Geometridae
- Genus: Scopula
- Species: S. inangulata

Binomial name
- Scopula inangulata (Warren, 1896)

Synonyms
- Ptychopoda inangulata Warren, 1896

Species of geometer moth in subfamily Sterrhinae

Scopula inangulata is a moth of the family Geometridae. It is found in India (the Khasi Hills).
