= Scopula ocheracea =

Scientific classification
- Kingdom: Animalia
- Phylum: Arthropoda
- Class: Insecta
- Order: Lepidoptera
- Family: Geometridae
- Genus: Scopula
- Species: S. ocheracea

Binomial name
- Scopula ocheracea (Hampson, 1891)

Synonyms
- Idaea ocheracea Hampson, 1891

Species of geometer moth in subfamily Sterrhinae

Scopula ocheracea is a moth of the family Geometridae which is found in south-eastern India.
