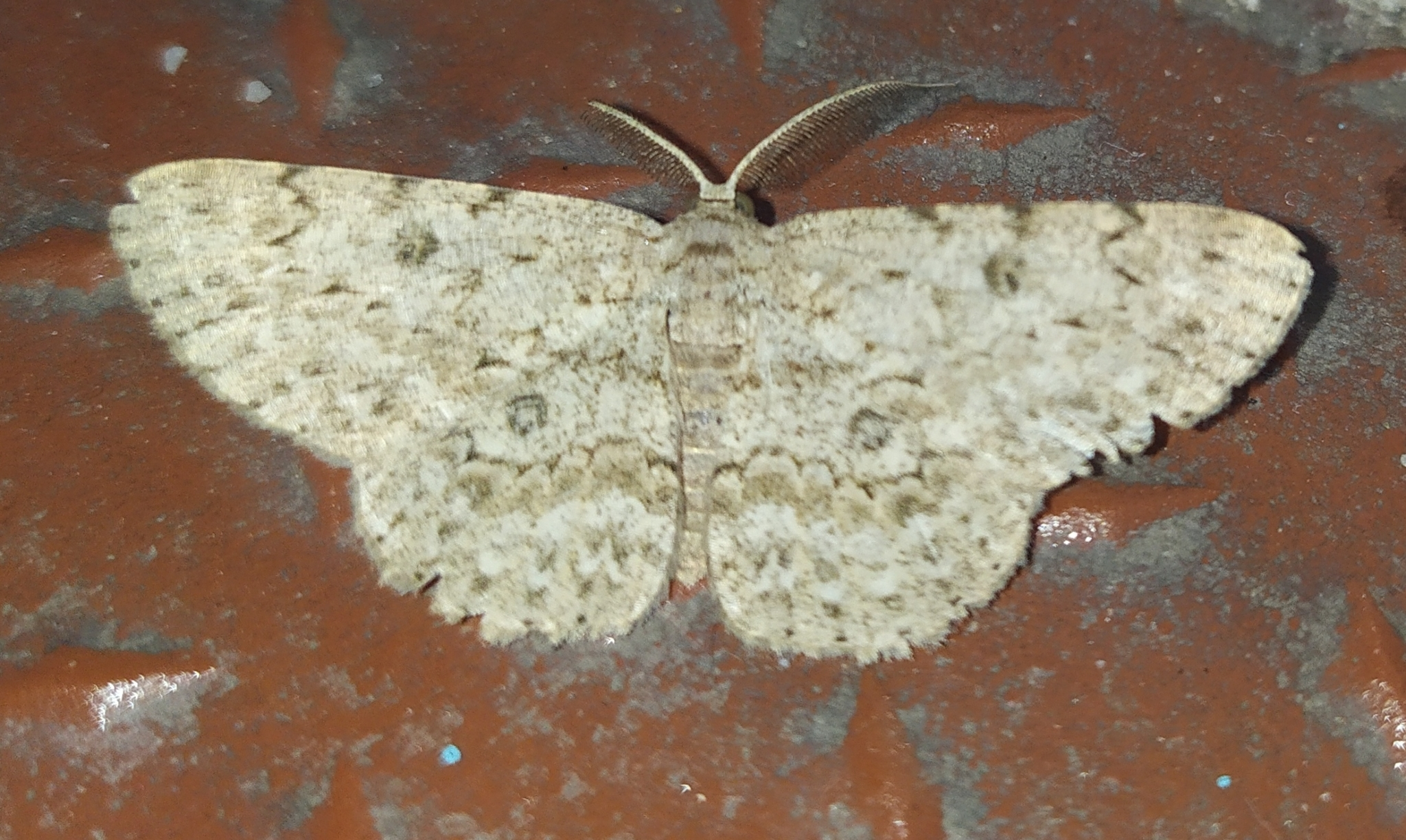

Scientific classification
- Kingdom: Animalia
- Phylum: Arthropoda
- Clade: Pancrustacea
- Class: Insecta
- Order: Lepidoptera
- Family: Geometridae
- Genus: Hypomecis
- Species: H. lioptilaria

Binomial name
- Hypomecis lioptilaria Swinhoe, 1901

= Hypomecis lioptilaria =

Species of insect

Hypomecis lioptilaria is a species from the genus Hypomecis. The species was originally described by Charles Swinhoe in 1901
