= Scopula nitidissima =

Scientific classification
- Kingdom: Animalia
- Phylum: Arthropoda
- Clade: Pancrustacea
- Class: Insecta
- Order: Lepidoptera
- Family: Geometridae
- Genus: Scopula
- Species: S. nitidissima

Binomial name
- Scopula nitidissima Prout, 1920

Species of geometer moth in subfamily Sterrhinae

Scopula nitidissima is a moth of the family Geometridae. It is found in Kashmir.
