= Scopula consimilata =

Scientific classification
- Kingdom: Animalia
- Phylum: Arthropoda
- Class: Insecta
- Order: Lepidoptera
- Family: Geometridae
- Genus: Scopula
- Species: S. consimilata

Binomial name
- Scopula consimilata (Warren, 1896)

Synonyms
- Ptychopoda consimilata Warren, 1896; Craspedia aggravata Warren, 1897; Scopula perfilata Prout, 1920; Scopula seductilis Prout, 1931

Species of geometer moth in subfamily Sterrhinae

Scopula consimilata is a moth of the family Geometridae. It was described by Warren in 1896. It is found in India (the Khasia Hills).

The wingspan is 24 millimetres (0.94 in). Adults have been recorded on wing from January to April.
