= Scopula remotata =

Scientific classification
- Kingdom: Animalia
- Phylum: Arthropoda
- Class: Insecta
- Order: Lepidoptera
- Family: Geometridae
- Genus: Scopula
- Species: S. remotata

Binomial name
- Scopula remotata (Guenée, [1858])

Synonyms
- Acidalia remotata Guenee, 1858

Species of geometer moth in subfamily Sterrhinae

Scopula remotata is a moth of the family Geometridae. It is found in northern India.
