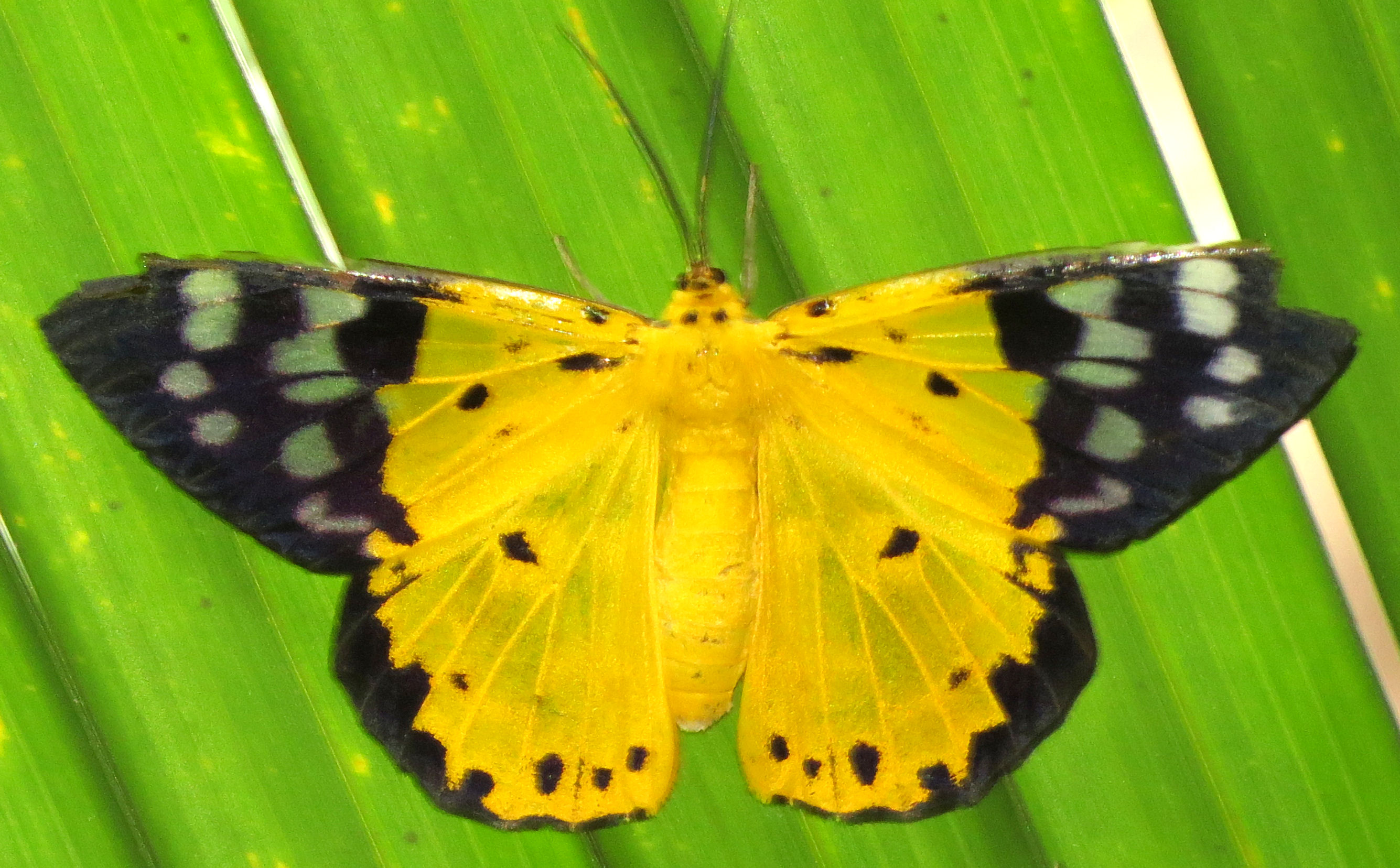
- From Scambodia

Scientific classification
- Kingdom: Animalia
- Phylum: Arthropoda
- Clade: Pancrustacea
- Class: Insecta
- Order: Lepidoptera
- Family: Geometridae
- Genus: Dysphania
- Species: D. sagana

Binomial name
- Dysphania sagana (Druce, 1882)

Synonyms
- Euschema sagana Druce, 1882; Euschema selangora Swinhoe, 1893; Dysphania isolata Warren, 1902

= Dysphania sagana =

Species of moth

Dysphania sagana is moth species in the family Geometridae first described by Druce in 1882. It is yellow and black and is found in southern Vietnam, Cambodia, Thailand, Peninsular Malaysia, Sumatra, and Borneo.

== Description ==
The basal half of the forewings is chrome yellow, while the outer half is bluish black, crossed by two bands of semitransparent white spots. The hindwings are chrome yellow with a black spot at the end of the cell. The apex and a submarginal row of spots are black. The head, thorax and abdomen are yellow.

The larvae have been recorded feeding on Carallia species.

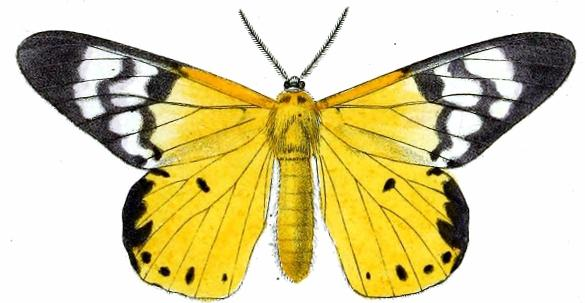
Illustration

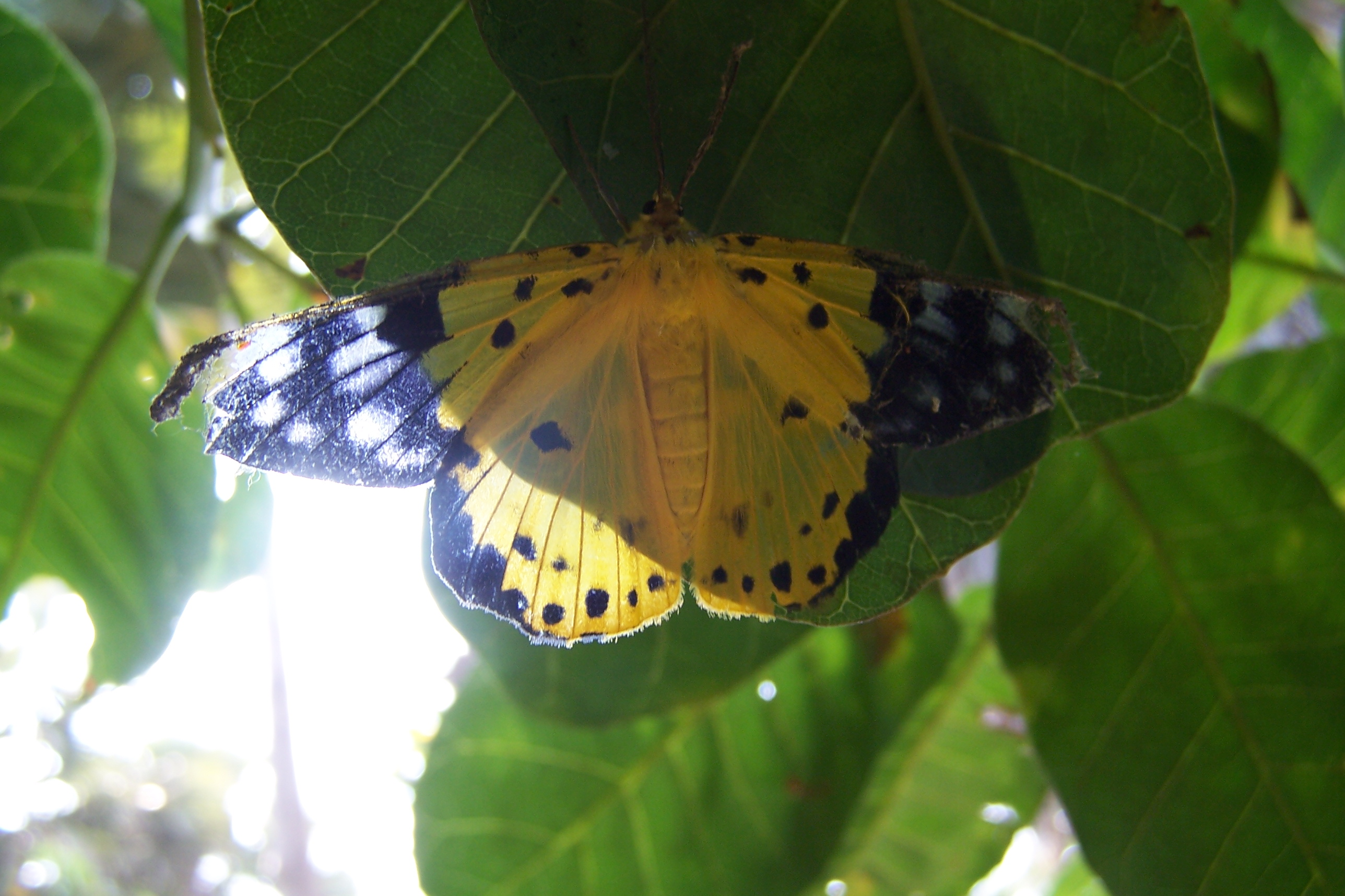
Seen at Banteay Srey Butterfly Centre

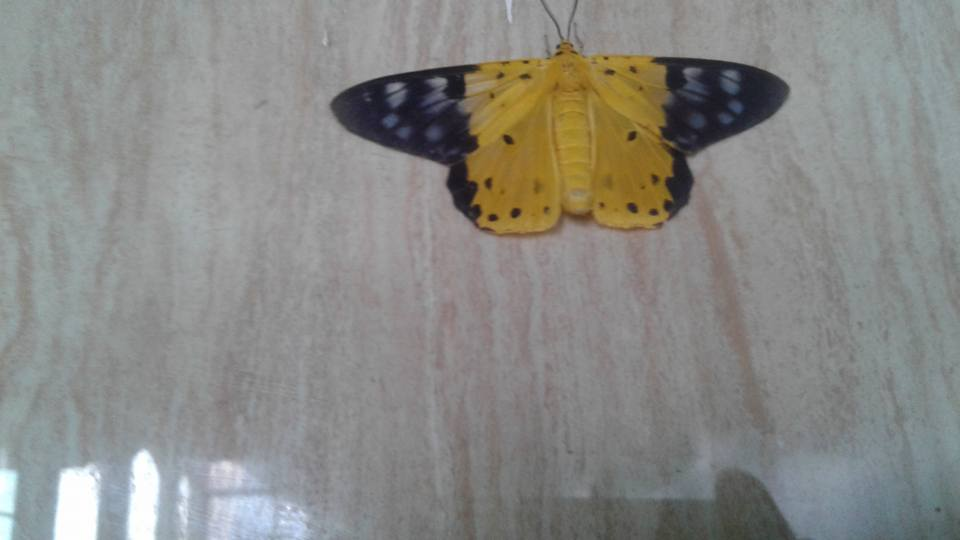
In Sihanoukville, Cambodia

== See also ==
- Dysphania militaris
- Dysphania percota
- Dysphania subrepleta
