= Mambarona obliquifascia =

Scientific classification
- Kingdom: Animalia
- Phylum: Arthropoda
- Clade: Pancrustacea
- Class: Insecta
- Order: Lepidoptera
- Family: Limacodidae
- Genus: Mambarona
- Species: M. obliquifascia

Binomial name
- Mambarona obliquifascia (Hampson, 1893)

Synonyms
- Birthama obliquifascia Hampson, 1893; Miresa canescens Hampson, 1896

Species of moth

Mambarona obliquifascia is a moth of the family Limacodidae first described by George Hampson in 1893. It is found in Sri Lanka, and India.

Adults are sexually dimorphic. Female much larger and heavier. Forewing fasciation is more distinct in female. Caterpillar with light leaf-green body. Surface of body smooth and perfect semiovoid. Small, thinly brown-ringed disc-like tubercles or dots present. When disturbed, the caterpillar produce a fluid from tubercles. A thin, indistinct white dorsal line is present. Pupation occurs in a smooth fat short chalky-white ovoid cocoon. The larval host plant is Carallia.
