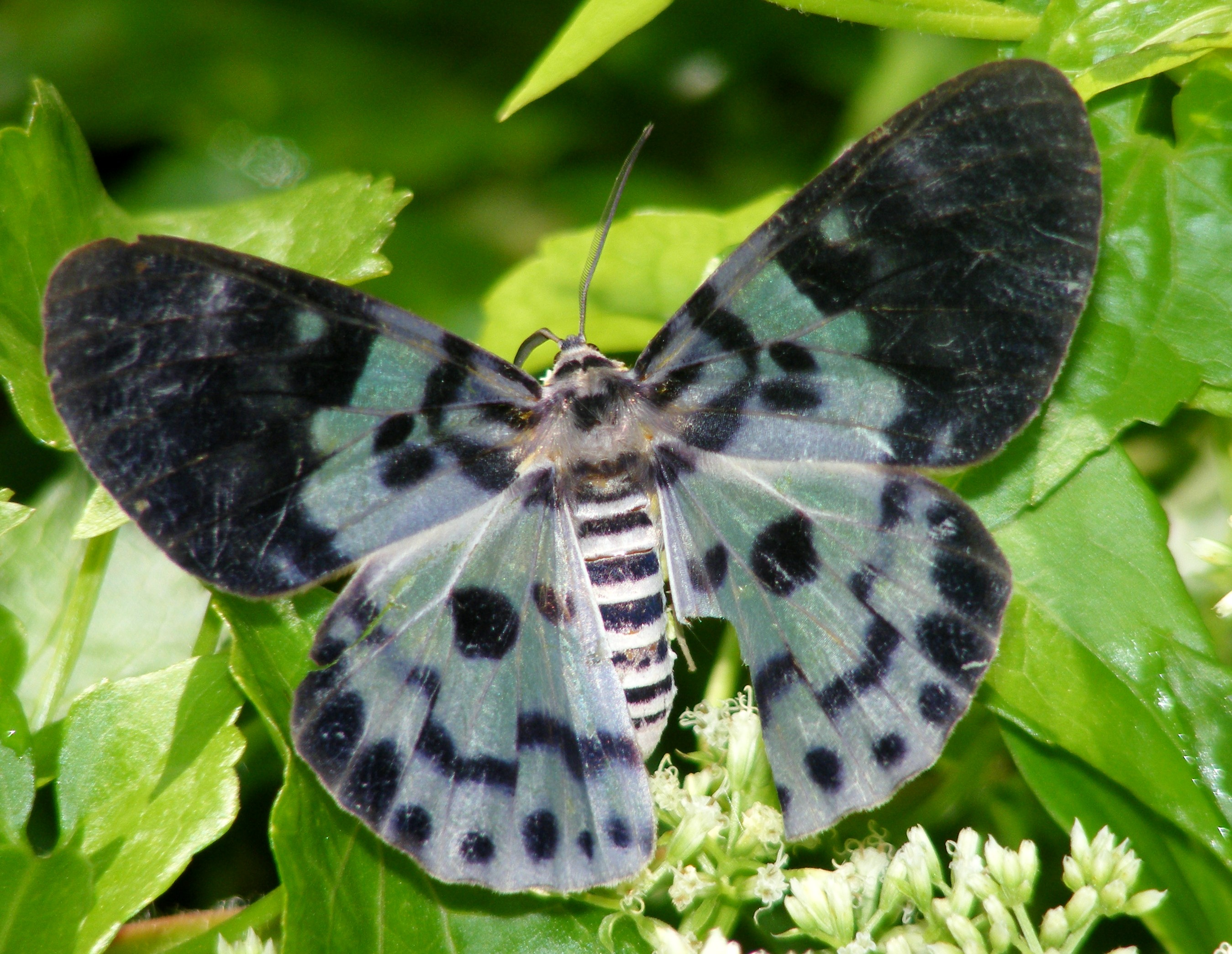

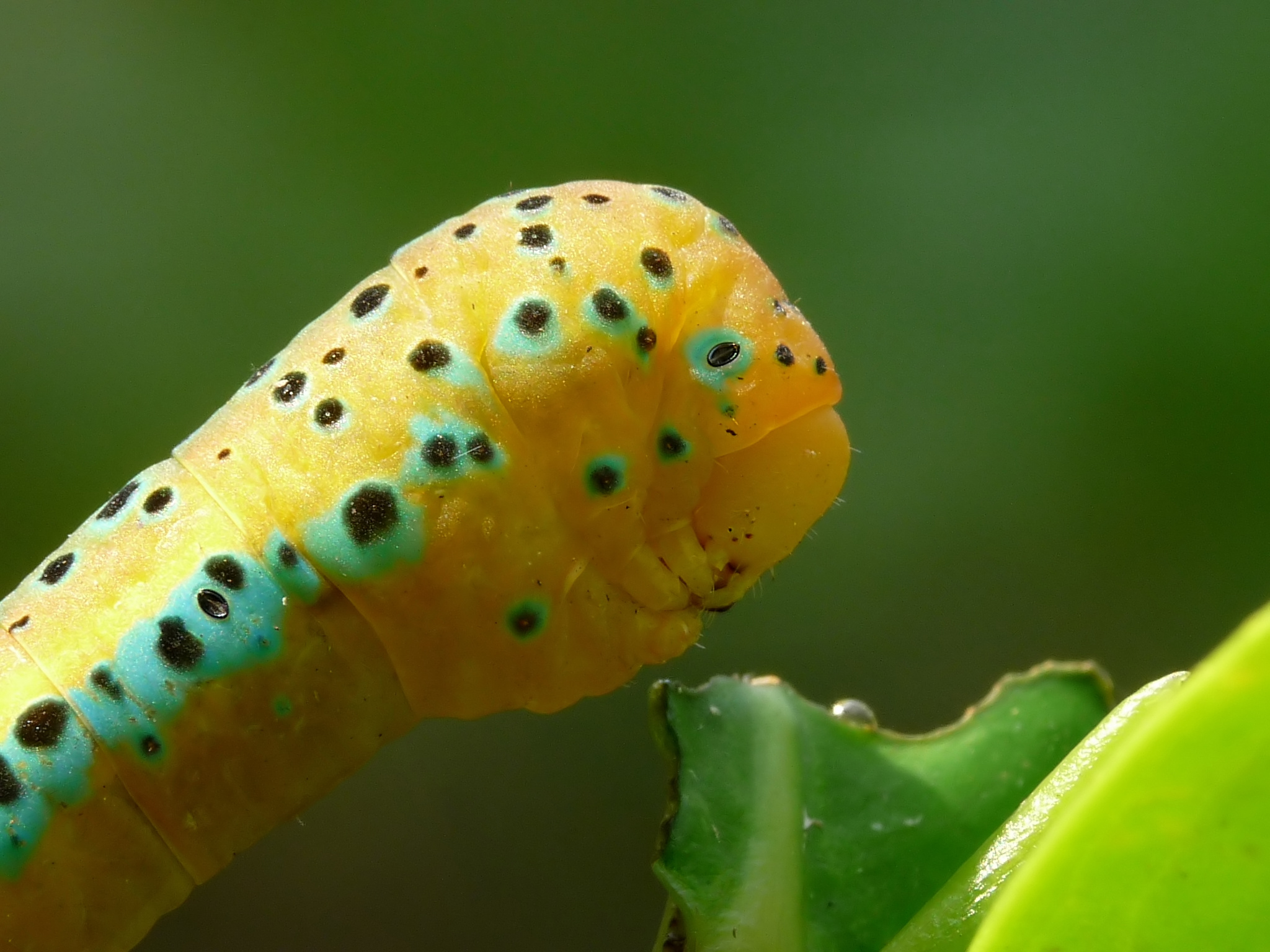
- Caterpillar

Scientific classification
- Kingdom: Animalia
- Phylum: Arthropoda
- Clade: Pancrustacea
- Class: Insecta
- Order: Lepidoptera
- Family: Geometridae
- Genus: Dysphania
- Species: D. percota

Binomial name
- Dysphania percota (C. Swinhoe, 1891)

= Dysphania percota =

Blue tiger moth

Species of moth

Dysphania percota, the blue tiger moth, is a moth of the family Geometridae that can be found in India. It was first described by Charles Swinhoe in 1891.

== Description ==
It is similar to Dysphania palmyra, but differs in the whole apical area of the forewings being deep purple from the discocellular spot and postmedial line to outer margin, with two small blue spots below the sub-costals and one on inner margin near outer angle. Hindwings never with any trace of yellow.

The larvae feed on Carallia species.

== Gallery ==
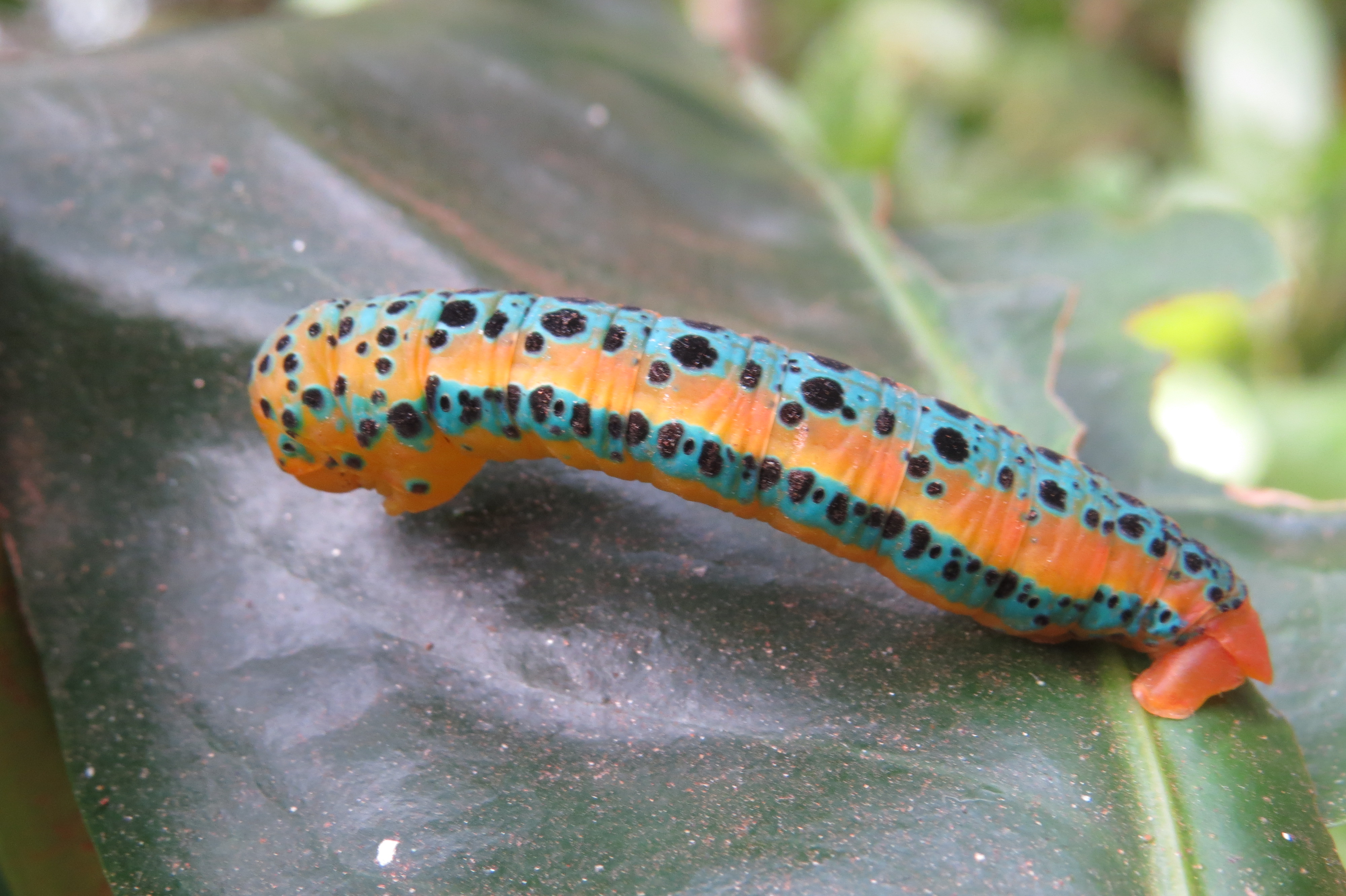
Late instar from Tuvvur, Malappuram, India

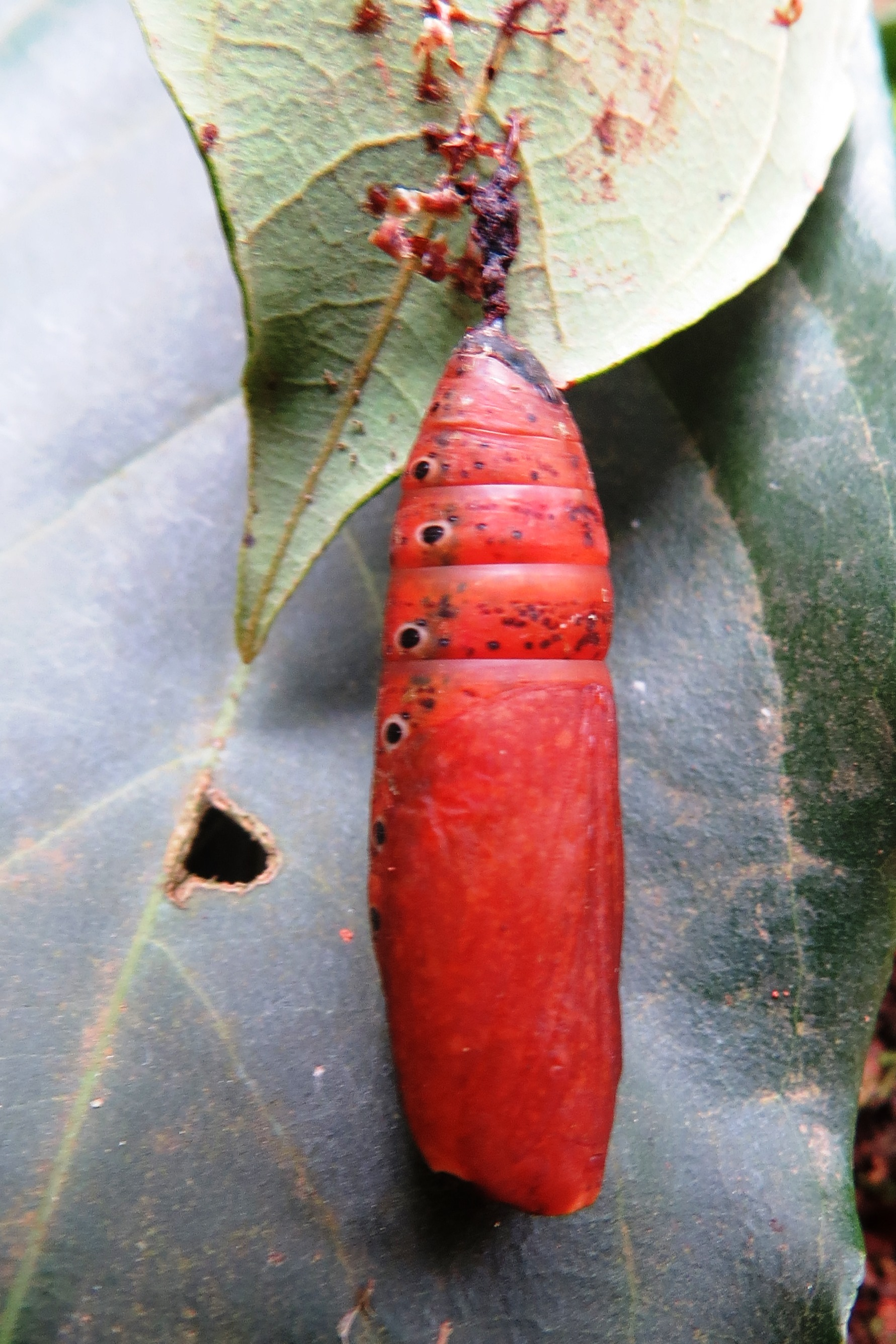
Pupa from Tuvvur

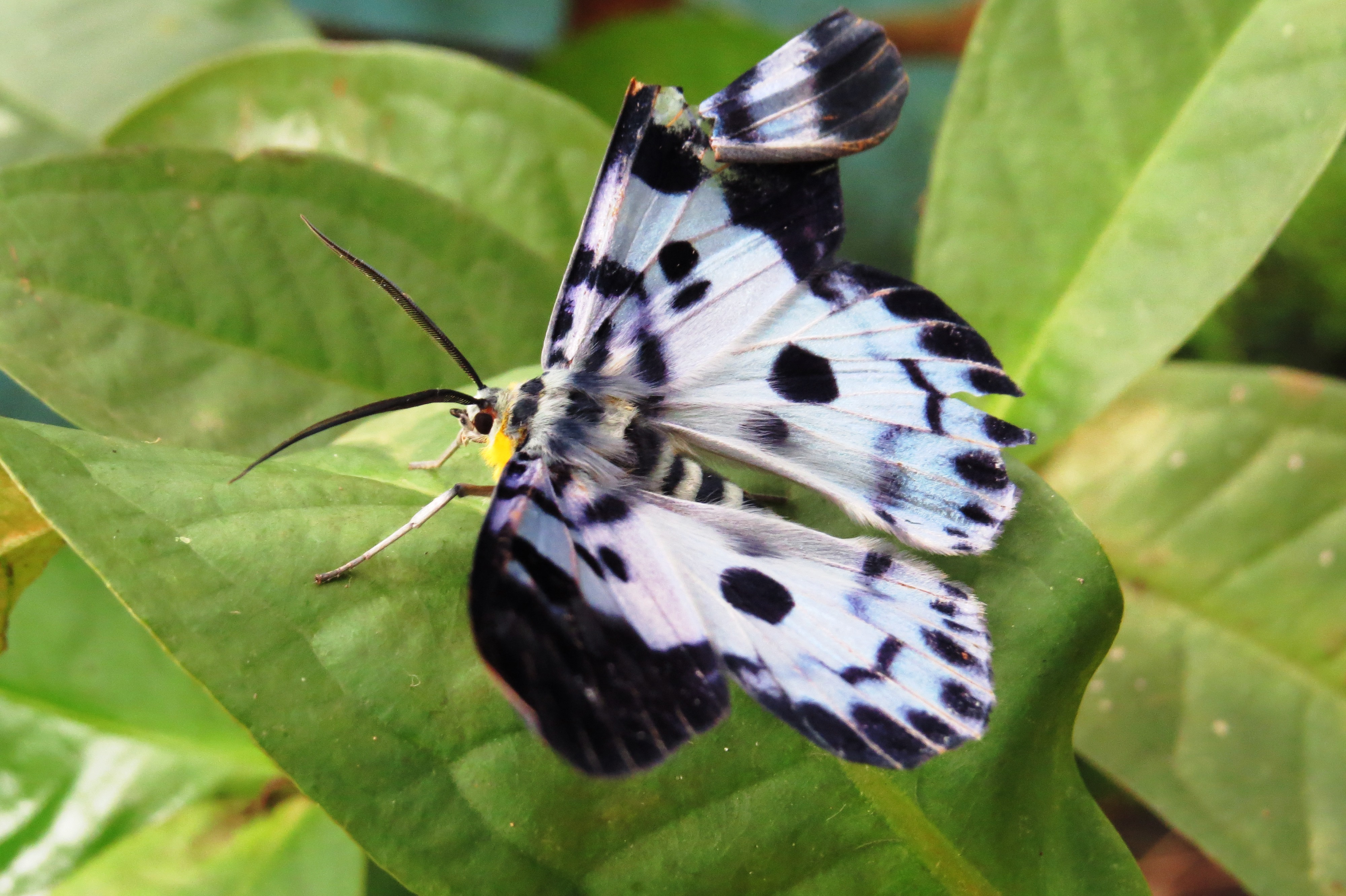
Adult from Tuvvur

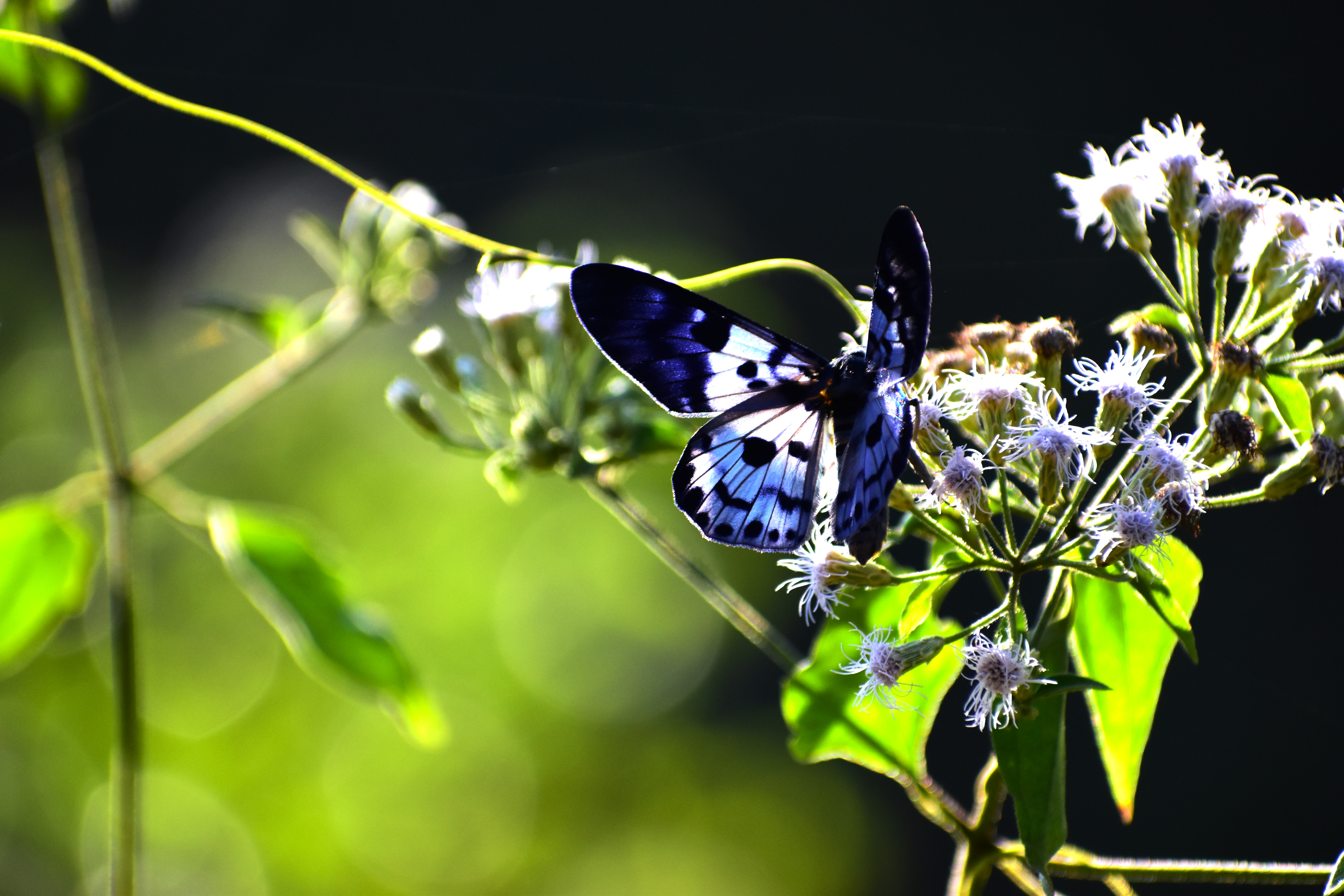
From Thiruvananthapuram, Kerala

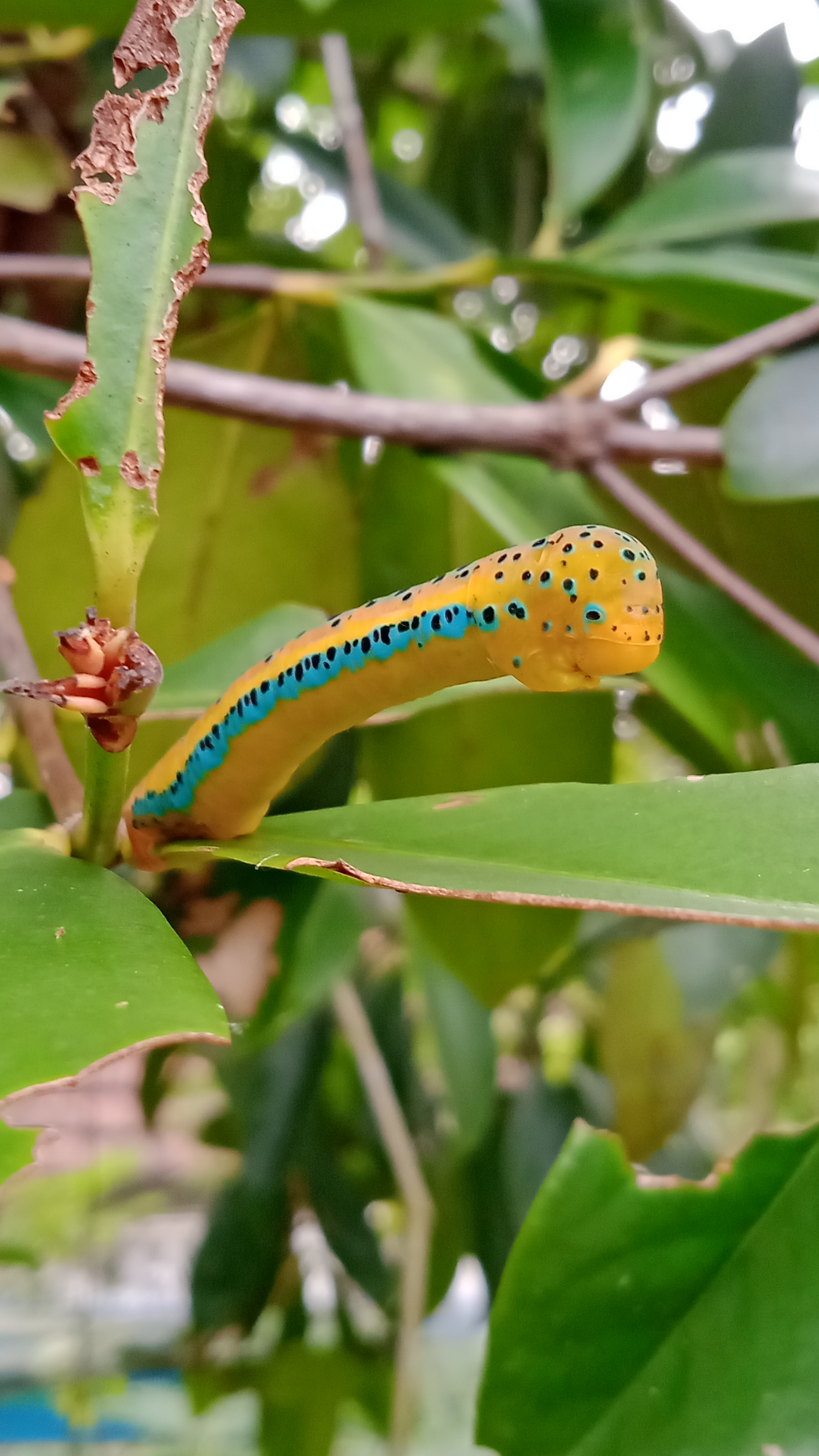
Larva of the Blue Tiger Moth

From Arthunkal, Alappuzha, Kerala.

== See also ==
- Dysphania militaris
- Dysphania sagana
- Dysphania palmyra
