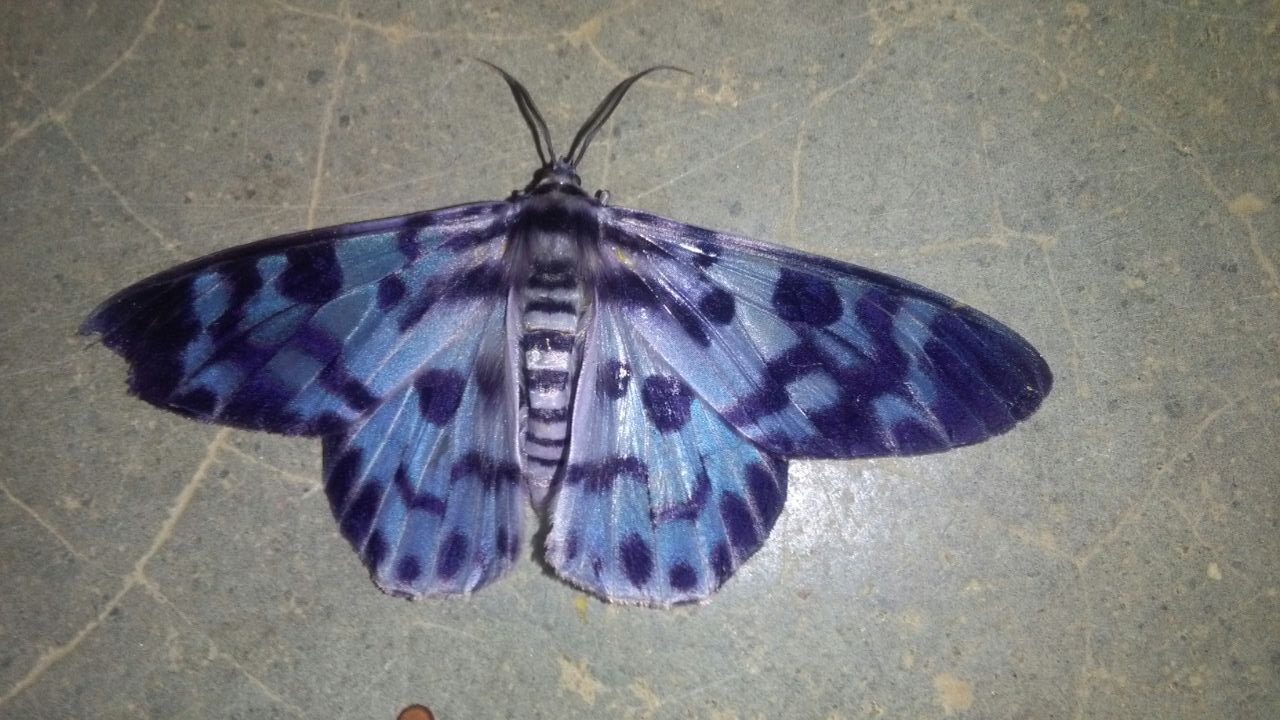
- Sri Lankan Blue Day Moth

Scientific classification
- Kingdom: Animalia
- Phylum: Arthropoda
- Clade: Pancrustacea
- Class: Insecta
- Order: Lepidoptera
- Family: Geometridae
- Genus: Dysphania
- Species: D. palmyra

Binomial name
- Dysphania palmyra Stoll, 1790

= Dysphania palmyra =

Species of moth

Dysphania palmyra, the long blue tiger moth or blue day moth, is a moth of the family Geometridae. The species was first described by Caspar Stoll in 1790. It is found in India and Sri Lanka.

The caterpillar is known to feed on Carallia brachiata and Camellia sinensis. Colouration is very similar to Dysphania percota.
