= Carallia eugenioidea =

Conservation status
- Near Threatened (IUCN 2.3)

Scientific classification
- Kingdom: Plantae
- Clade: Tracheophytes
- Clade: Angiosperms
- Clade: Eudicots
- Clade: Rosids
- Order: Malpighiales
- Family: Rhizophoraceae
- Genus: Carallia
- Species: C. eugenioidea

Binomial name
- Carallia eugenioidea King

Synonyms
- Carallia eugenioidea var. sumatrensis Mot.Ito & M.Hotta; Carallia euryoides Ridl.; Carallia montana Ridl.

Species of tree

Carallia eugenioidea is a species of flowering plant in the Rhizophoraceae family. It is a shrub or tree native to Cambodia, Vietnam, Peninsular Malaysia, and Sumatra. It grows in lowland and hill tropical rain forest. It is threatened by habitat loss.

The species was first described by George King in 1897.
