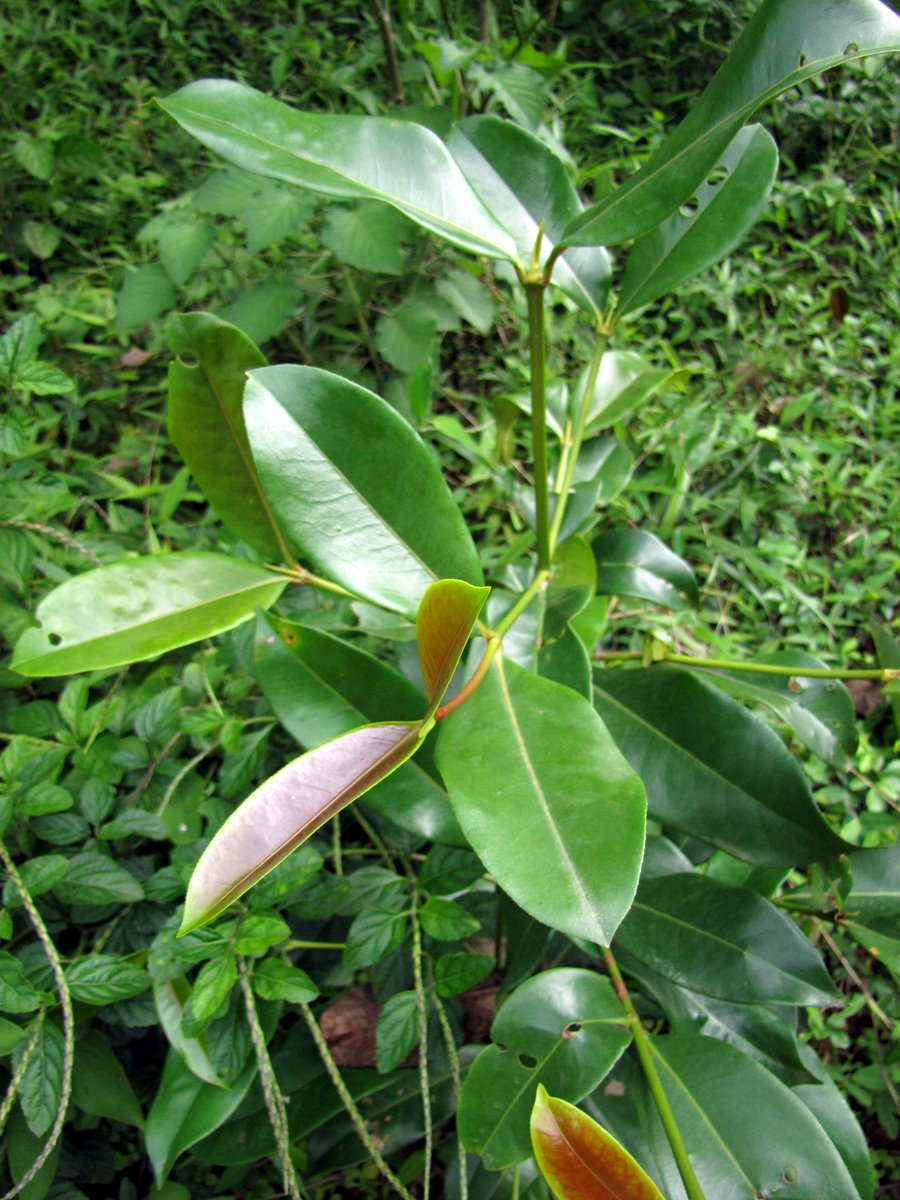
- Carallia brachiata

Conservation status
- Least Concern (IUCN 3.1)

Scientific classification
- Kingdom: Plantae
- Clade: Tracheophytes
- Clade: Angiosperms
- Clade: Eudicots
- Clade: Rosids
- Order: Malpighiales
- Family: Rhizophoraceae
- Genus: Carallia
- Species: C. brachiata

Binomial name
- Carallia brachiata (Lour.) Merr.

Synonyms
- 48 synonyms: Diatoma brachiata Lour.; Karekandelia brachiata (Lour.) Kuntze; Petalotoma brachiata (Lour.) DC.; Pootia cereopsifolia Miq. ex Benth.; Stalagmitis lamponga Miq.; Eugenia cupulifera H.Perrier; Baraultia madagascariensis (DC.) Steud. ex Spreng.; Barraldeia madagascariensis DC.; Bruguiera nemorosa Blanco; Carallia arguta Koord. & Valeton; Carallia baraldeia Arn.; Carallia celebica Blume; Carallia cerisopsitolia Miq.; Carallia ceylanica Arn.; Carallia confinis Blume; Carallia confinis var. latifolia Miq.; Carallia confinis var. oxyodon Miq.; Carallia confinis var. pauciflora Blume; Carallia corymbosa Arn.; Carallia cuprea Ridl.; Carallia cuspidata Blume; Carallia densiflora Griff.; Carallia floribunda Miq.; Carallia integerrima DC.; Carallia integrifolia J.Graham; Carallia lanceifolia Roxb. ex DC.; Carallia lanceolaria Wall.; Carallia lucida Roxb.; Carallia madagascariensis (DC.) Tul.; Carallia multiflora Blume; Carallia multiflora Miq.; Carallia obcordata Wight ex Walp.; Carallia octopetala F.Muell. ex Benth.; Carallia scortechinii King; Carallia sinensis Arn.; Carallia spinulosa Ridl.; Carallia symmetria Blume; Carallia timorensis Blume; Carallia viridiflora Ridl.; Carallia zeylanica Arn.; Demidofia nodosa Dennst.; Karekandelia calycina Kuntze; Karekandelia celebica Kuntze; Karekandelia confinis Kuntze; Karekandelia cuspidata Kuntze; Karekandelia lanceifolia Kuntze; Karekandelia multiflora Kuntze; Symmetria obovata Blume

= Carallia brachiata =

Species of tree

Carallia brachiata is a species of flowering plant in the family Rhizophoraceae. This large tree grows to a height of 25 metres (82 ft) and is found from Australia, through South East Asia to the Western Ghats. It is the host plant of the moth Dysphania percota in India and Dysphania numana in Australia.

== Distribution ==
It is native to the following regions as defined in the World Geographical Scheme for Recording Plant Distributions:

- Western Indian Ocean: Madagascar
- China: China South-Central, China Southeast
- Eastern Asia: Hainan
- Indian Subcontinent: Assam, Bangladesh, East Himalaya, India, Nepal, Sri Lanka
- Indo-China: Andaman Islands, Cambodia, Laos, Myanmar, Nicobar Islands, Thailand, Vietnam
- Malesia: Borneo, Jawa, Lesser Sunda Islands, Malaya, Maluku, Philippines, Sulawesi, Sumatera
- Papuasia: Bismarck Archipelago, New Guinea, Solomon Islands
- Australia: Northern Territory, Queensland, Western Australia

== Gallery ==
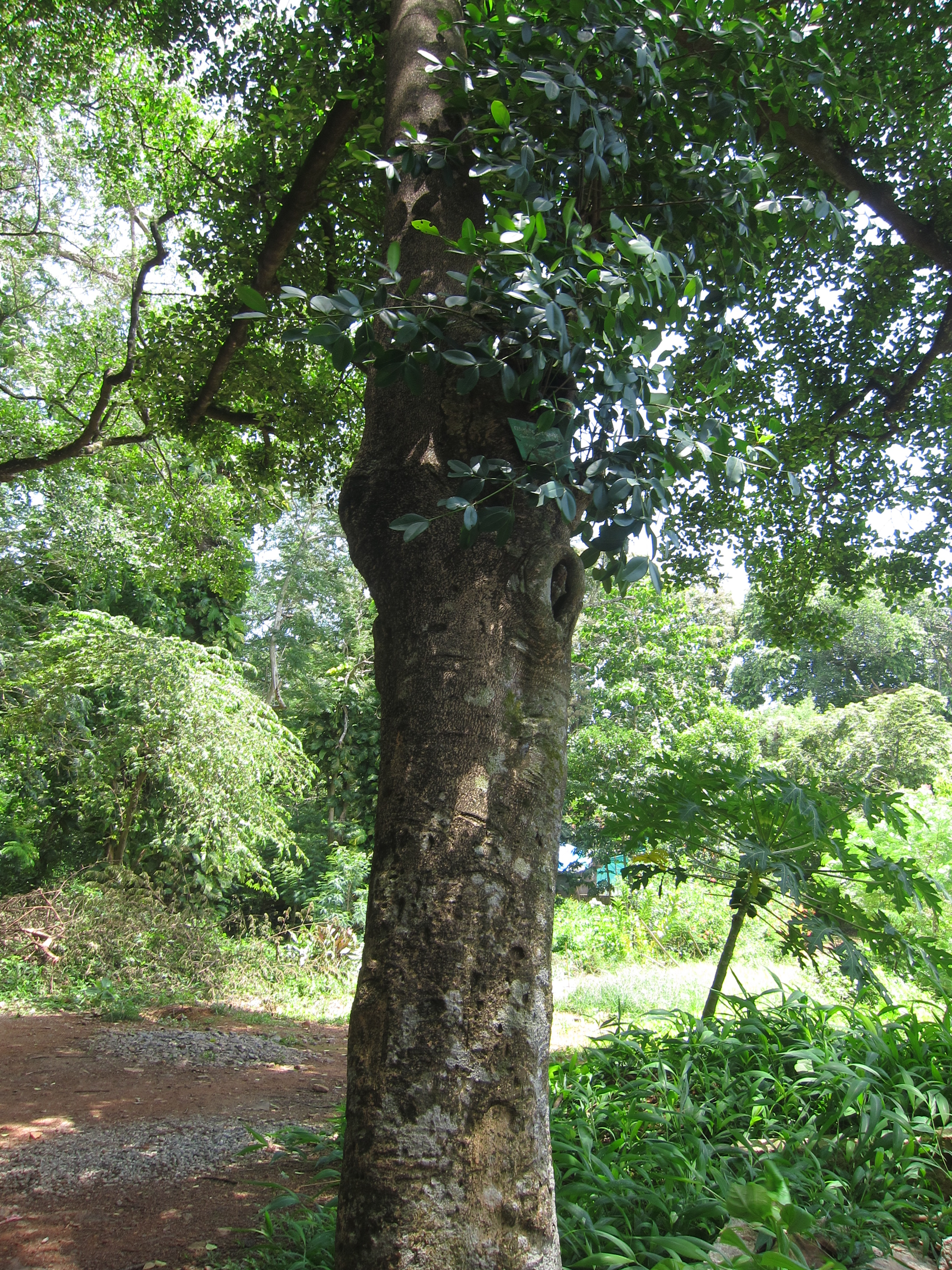
Tree trunk

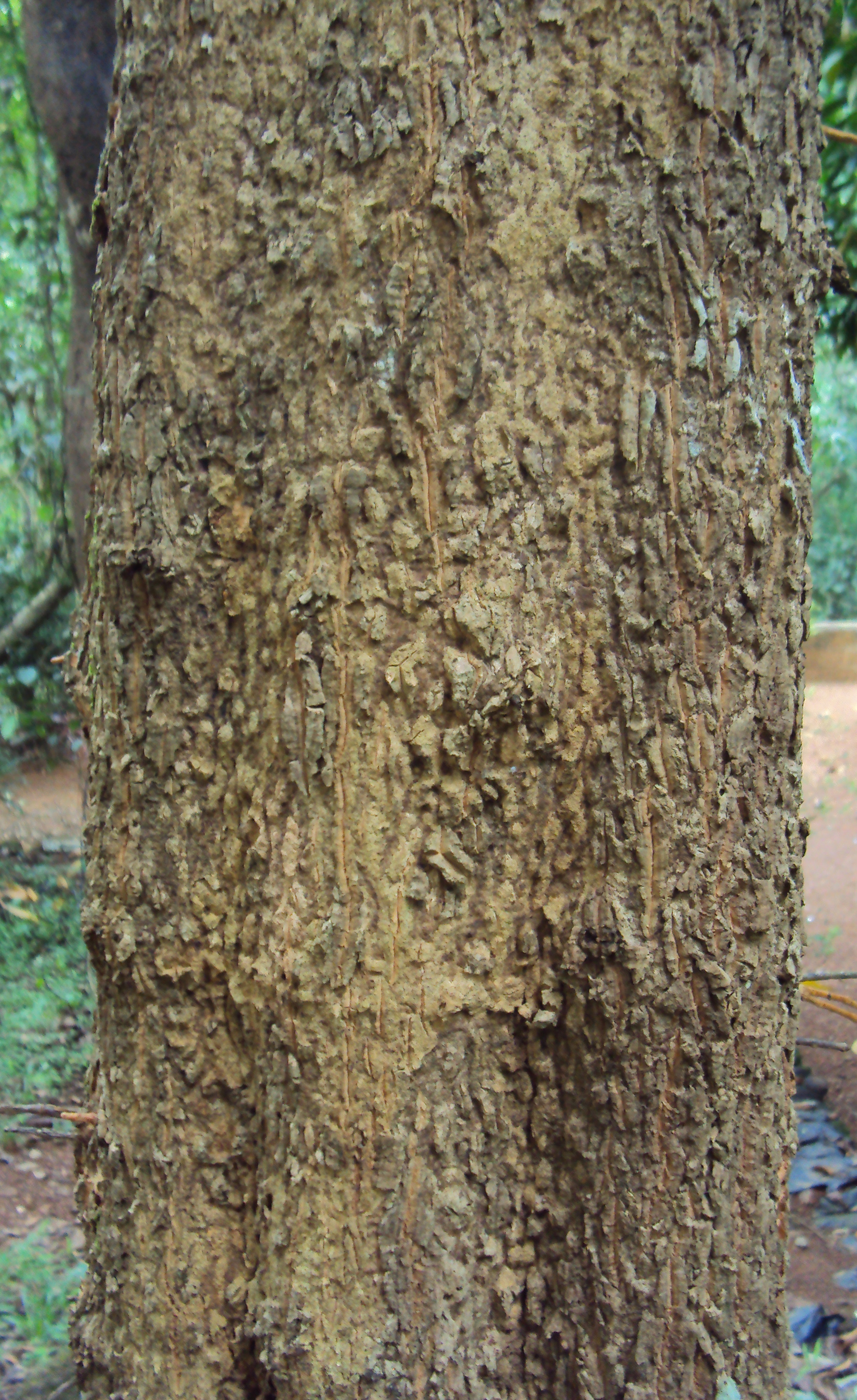
Bark

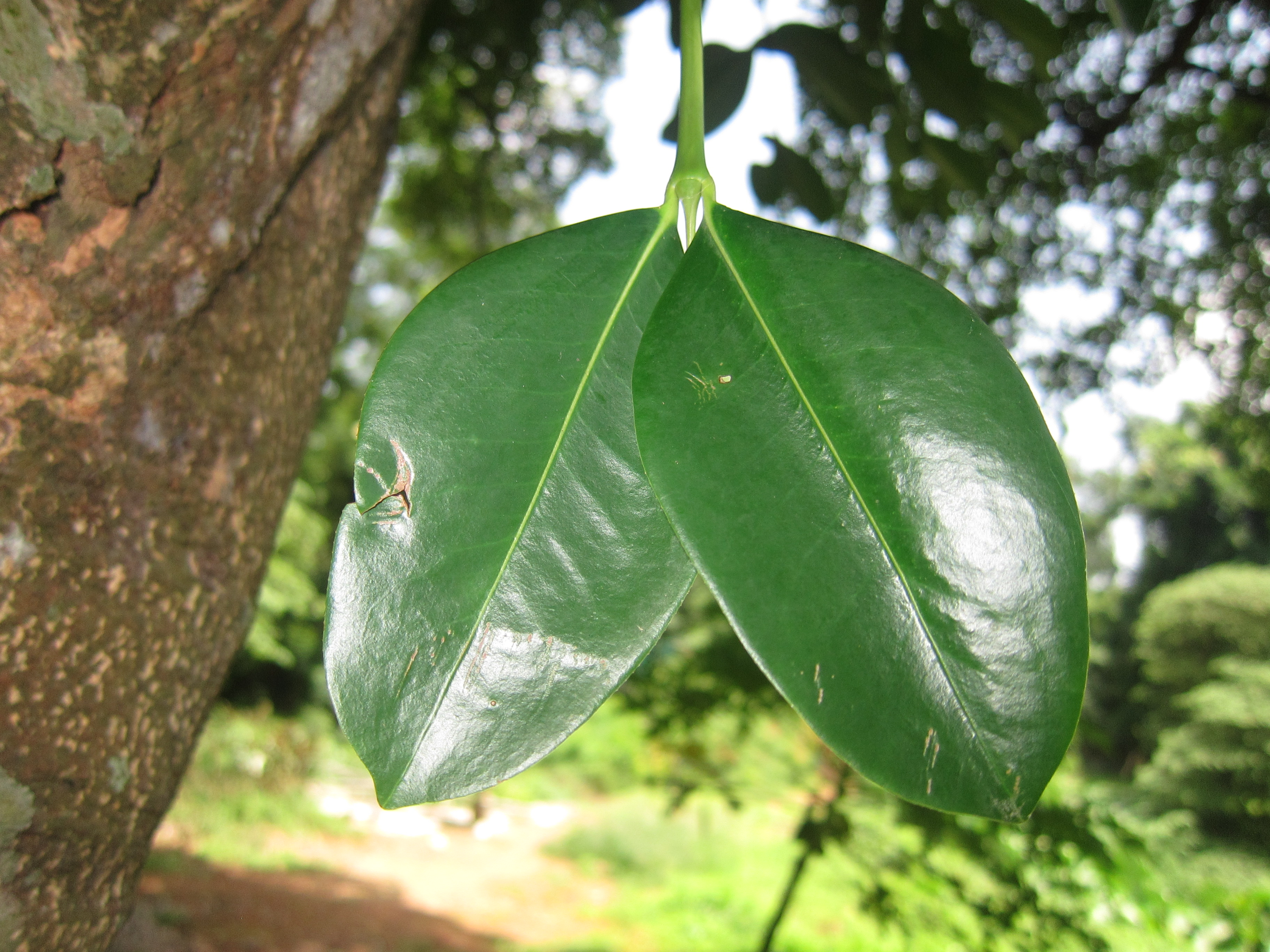
Opposite leaves

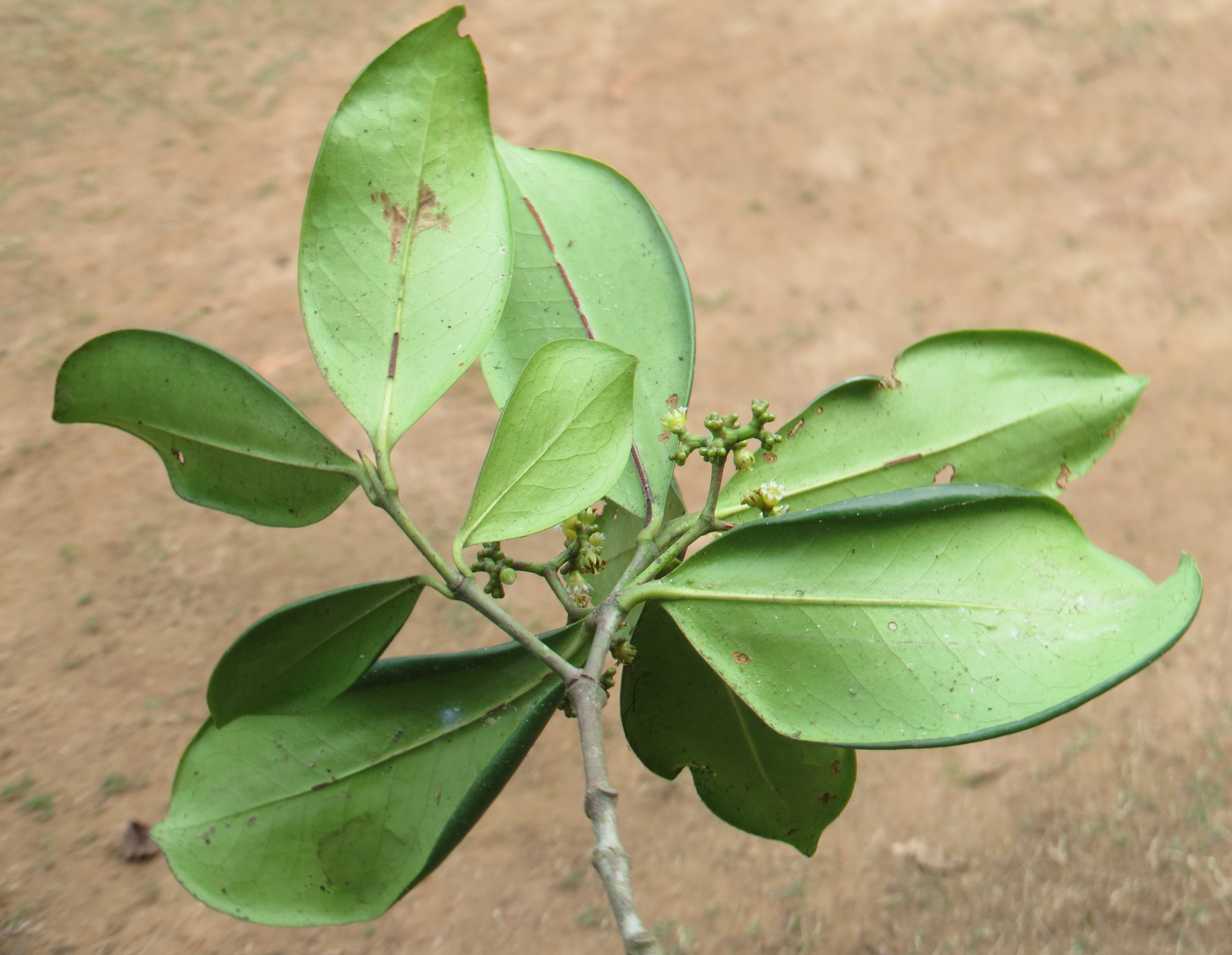
Underside of leaves

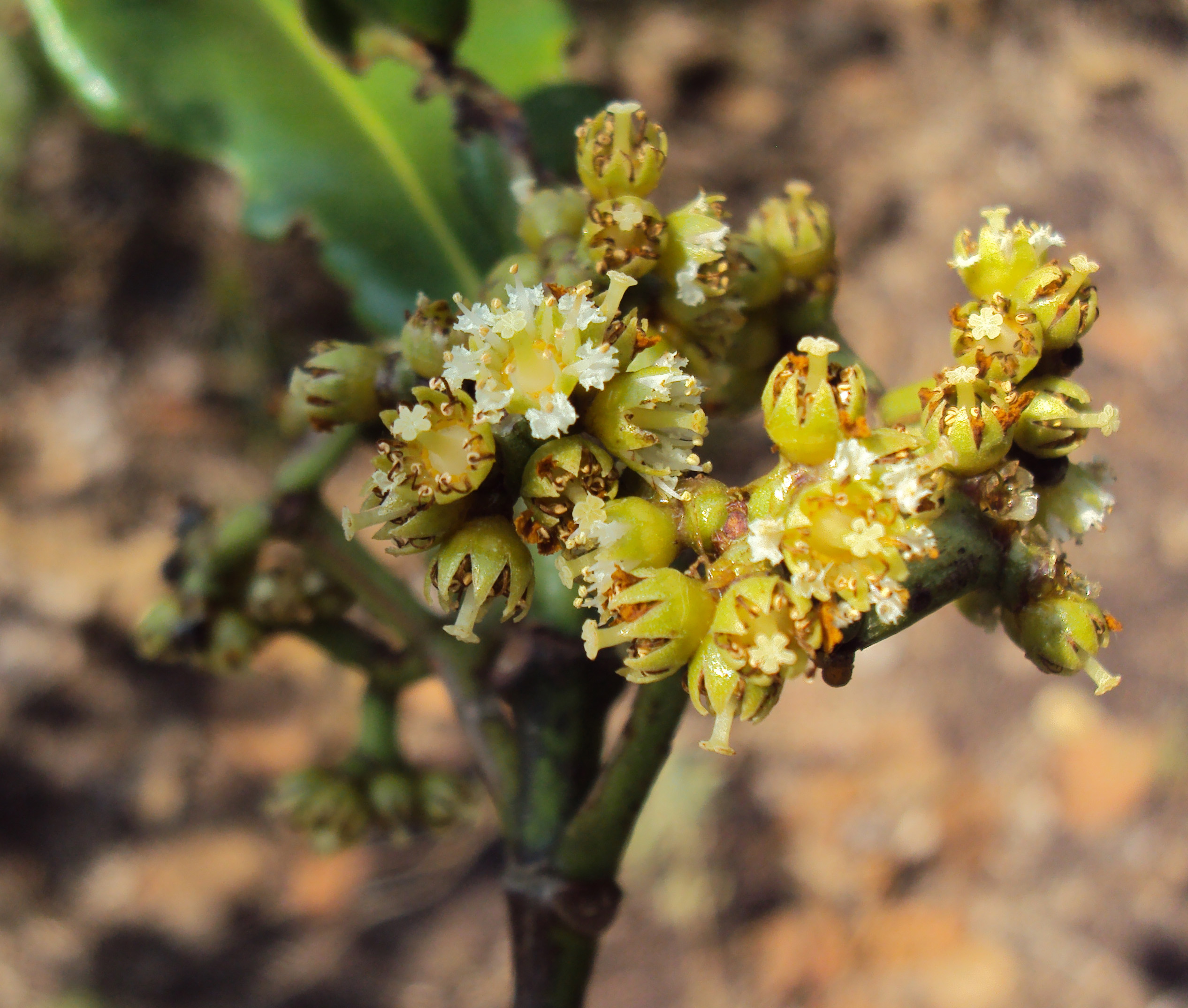
Inflorescence

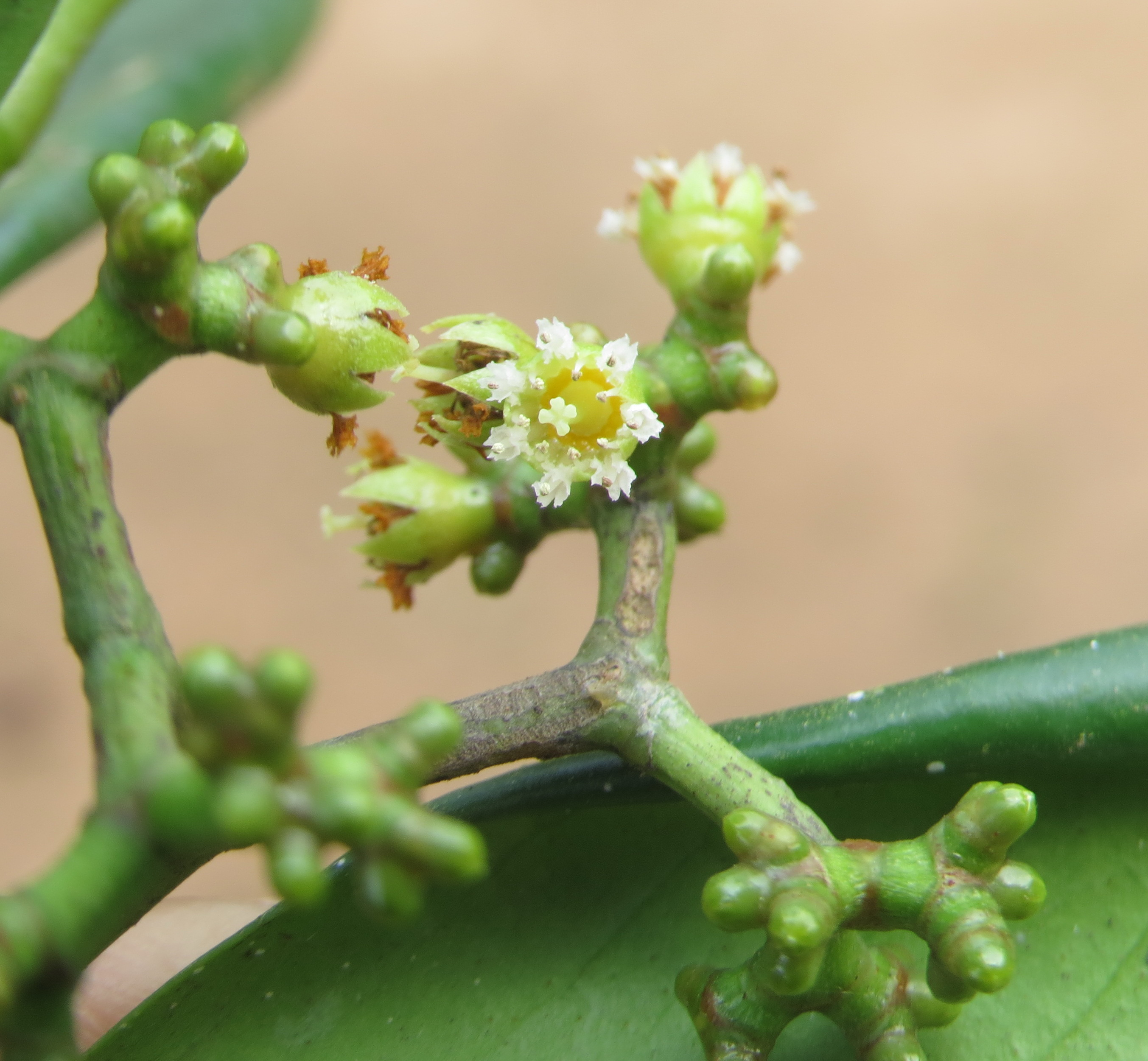
Flower

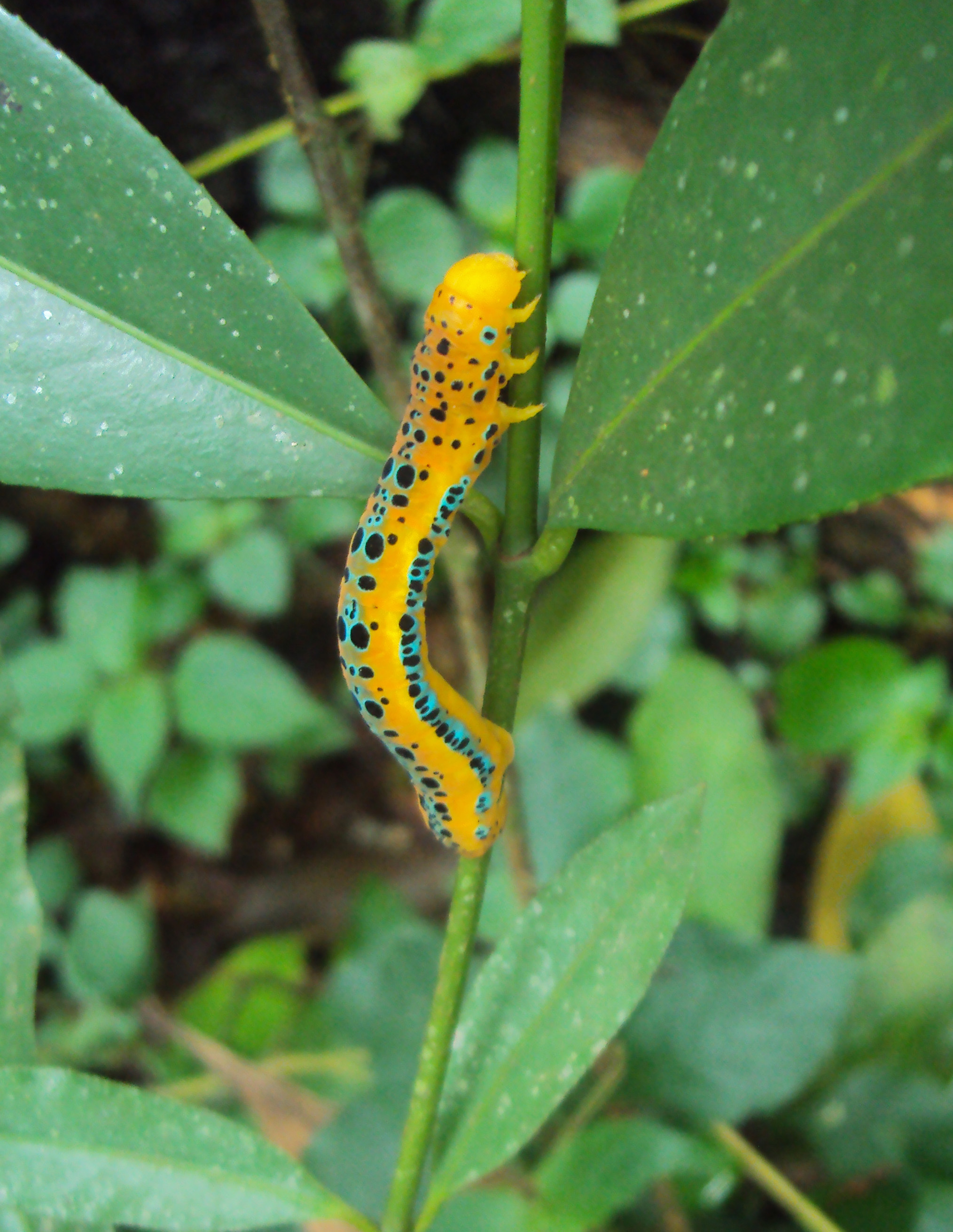
Dysphania percota caterpillar on twig
