= Dysphania prunicolor =

Scientific classification
- Domain: Eukaryota
- Kingdom: Animalia
- Phylum: Arthropoda
- Class: Insecta
- Order: Lepidoptera
- Family: Geometridae
- Genus: Dysphania
- Species: D. prunicolor

Binomial name
- Dysphania prunicolor Moore, 1879

Species of moth

Dysphania prunicolor is a moth of the family Geometridae first described by Frederic Moore in 1879. It is found in India and may be found in Sri Lanka.
