= Carallia diplopetala =

Conservation status
- Near Threatened (IUCN 2.3)

Scientific classification
- Kingdom: Plantae
- Clade: Tracheophytes
- Clade: Angiosperms
- Clade: Eudicots
- Clade: Rosids
- Order: Malpighiales
- Family: Rhizophoraceae
- Genus: Carallia
- Species: C. diplopetala

Binomial name
- Carallia diplopetala Hand.-Mazz.

Species of flowering plant

Carallia diplopetala is a species of plant in the Rhizophoraceae family that can be found in China and Vietnam.
