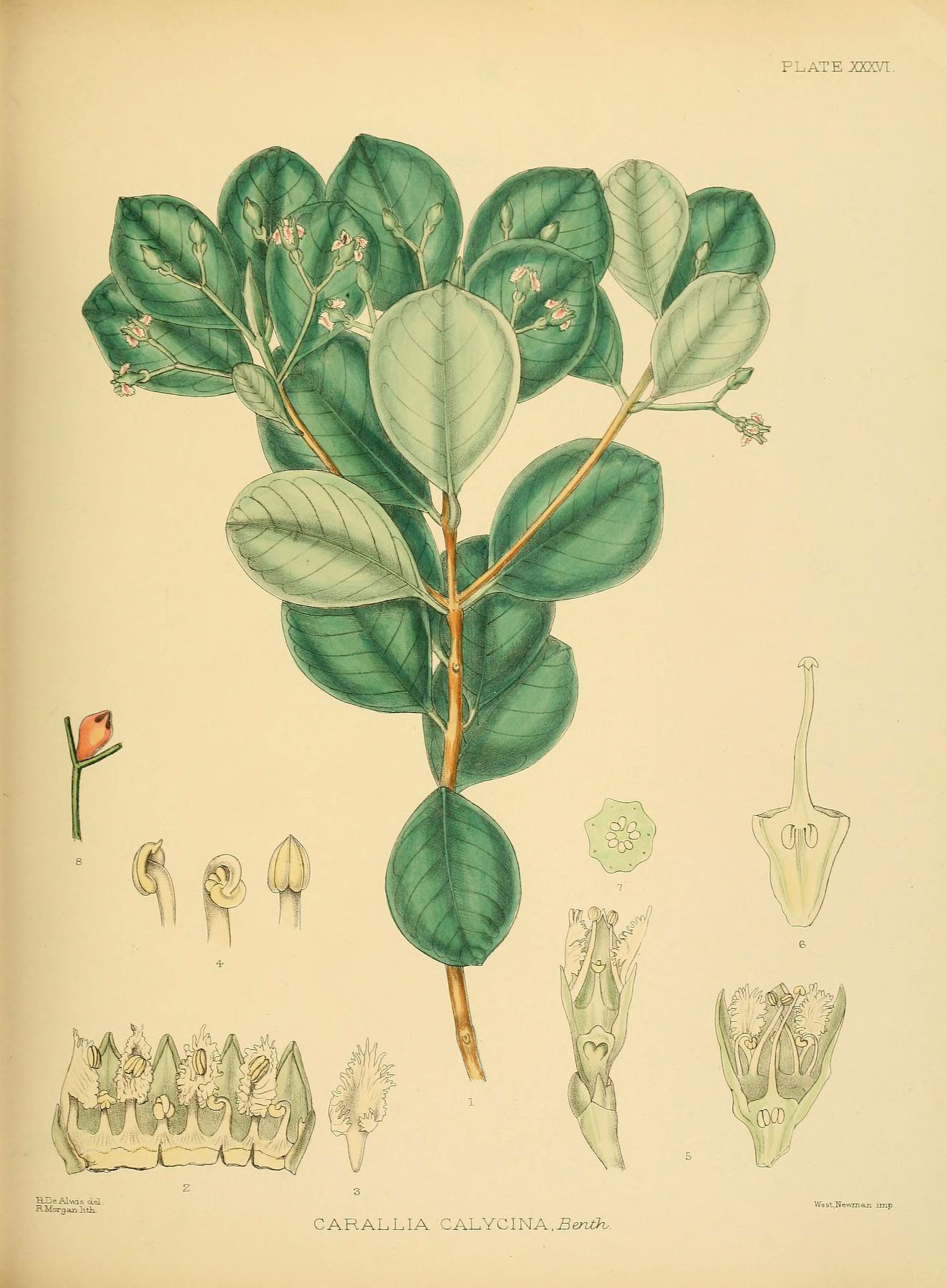

Conservation status
- Vulnerable (IUCN 2.3)

Scientific classification
- Kingdom: Plantae
- Clade: Tracheophytes
- Clade: Angiosperms
- Clade: Eudicots
- Clade: Rosids
- Order: Malpighiales
- Family: Rhizophoraceae
- Genus: Carallia
- Species: C. calycina

Binomial name
- Carallia calycina Benth.

= Carallia calycina =

Species of flowering plant

Carallia calycina is a species of plant in the family Rhizophoraceae endemic to Sri Lanka.
