= Carallia coriifolia =

Scientific classification
- Kingdom: Plantae
- Clade: Tracheophytes
- Clade: Angiosperms
- Clade: Eudicots
- Clade: Rosids
- Order: Malpighiales
- Family: Rhizophoraceae
- Genus: Carallia
- Species: C. coriifolia

Binomial name
- Carallia coriifolia Ridl.

Species of tree

Carallia coriifolia is a tree of Borneo in the family Rhizophoraceae. The specific epithet coriifolia is from the Latin meaning 'leathery leaf'.

== Description ==
Carallia coriifolia grows as a small tree up to 10 metres (30 ft) tall. Its flaky bark is dark grey. The ellipsoid fruits measure up to 1.2 cm (0.5 in) long.

== Distribution and habitat ==
Carallia coriifolia is endemic to Borneo. Its habitat is dipterocarp forest from sea-level to 1,000 m (3,300 ft) altitude.
