= Carallia borneensis =

Scientific classification
- Kingdom: Plantae
- Clade: Tracheophytes
- Clade: Angiosperms
- Clade: Eudicots
- Clade: Rosids
- Order: Malpighiales
- Family: Rhizophoraceae
- Genus: Carallia
- Species: C. borneensis

Binomial name
- Carallia borneensis Oliv.

Synonyms
- Carallia mindanaensis Merr.

Species of tree

Carallia borneensis is a tree of tropical Asia in the family Rhizophoraceae. The specific epithet borneensis is from the Latin, referring to the species being native to Borneo.

== Description ==
Carallia borneensis grows as a tree up to 25 metres (80 ft) tall. Its fissured bark is pale to brownish. The oblong to ellipsoid fruits measure up to 1.0 cm (0.4 in) long.

== Distribution and habitat ==
Carallia borneensis grows naturally in Borneo, the Philippines and New Guinea. Its habitat is lowland forest from sea-level to 1,000 m (3,300 ft) altitude.
