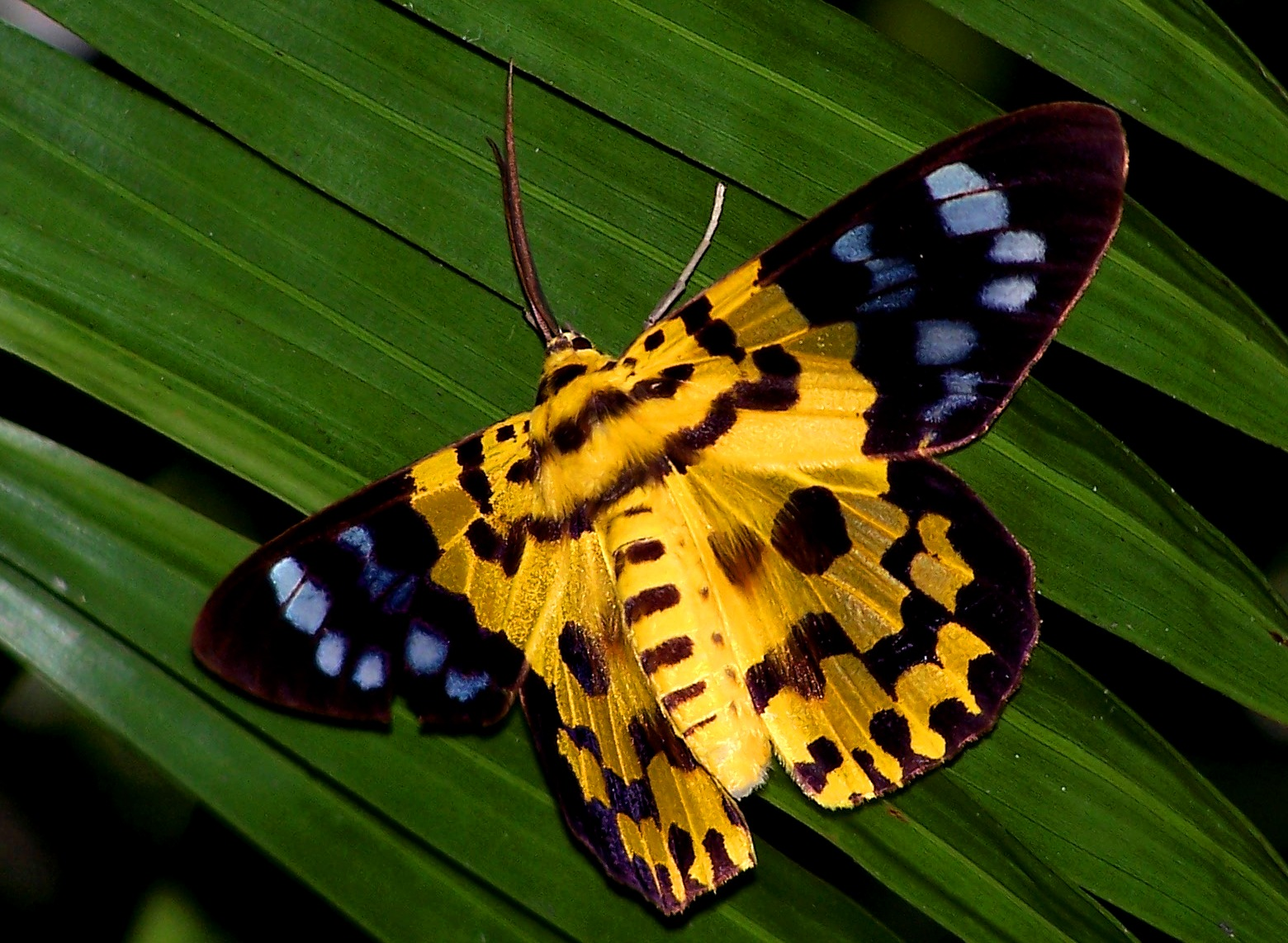
- D. militaris

Scientific classification
- Kingdom: Animalia
- Phylum: Arthropoda
- Clade: Pancrustacea
- Class: Insecta
- Order: Lepidoptera
- Family: Geometridae
- Subfamily: Geometrinae
- Genus: Dysphania; Hübner, [1819]

Synonyms
- Deileptena Guérin-Méneville, 1831; Euschema Hübner, 1819; Hazis Boisduval, 1832; Heleona Swainson, 1833; Pareuschema Thierry-Mieg 1905; Polenivora Gistl, 1848

= Dysphania (moth) =

Genus of moths

Dysphania is a genus of colourful moths in the family Geometridae and typical of the tribe Dysphaniini; they are sometimes called 'false tiger moths' and are found in northeast Australia, Melanesia, and south, east and southeast Asia.

== Description ==
Most Dysphania are day flying, but there are also nocturnal species. With a typical wingspan of 50–85 millimetres (2.0–3.3 in), they are relatively large compared to many other members of this family.

== Species ==
Species include (incomplete list):

- Dysphania ares (Weymer, 1885)
- Dysphania bivexillata Prout, 1912
- Dysphania cuprina Felder 1874
- Dysphania cyane (Cramer, [1780])
- Dysphania discalis (Walker, 1854)
- Dysphania electra Weymer, 1885
- Dysphania flavidiscalis Warren, 1895
- Dysphania glaucescens (Walker, 1861)
- Dysphania malayanus (Guérin-Méneville, 1843) - Thailand, western Malesia to Palawan
- Dysphania militaris (Linnaeus, 1758) - India, southern China, Indochina, Malesia
- Dysphania numana (Cramer, [1779]) - type species as Phalaena numana - northern Australia, Kiriwina island
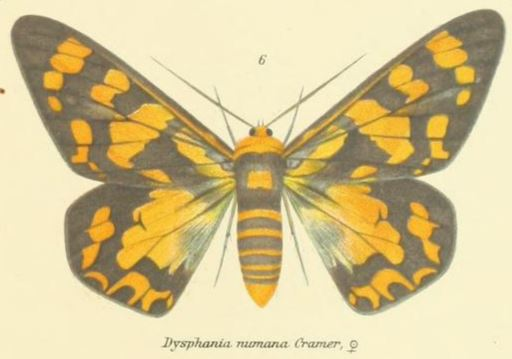
  Dysphania numana
- Dysphania palmyra Stoll, 1790 - Sri Lanka
- Dysphania percota (Swinhoe, 1891) - western India
- Dysphania poeyii (Guérin-Méneville, 1831)
- Dysphania prunicolor Moore, 1879 - India and Sri Lanka
- Dysphania sagana (Druce, 1882) - Indochina, Sumatra
- Dysphania snelleni (Pagenstecher, 1886)
- Dysphania subrepleta (Walker, 1854) - Indochina, western Malesia including Borneo
- Dysphania transducta (Walker, 1861)
