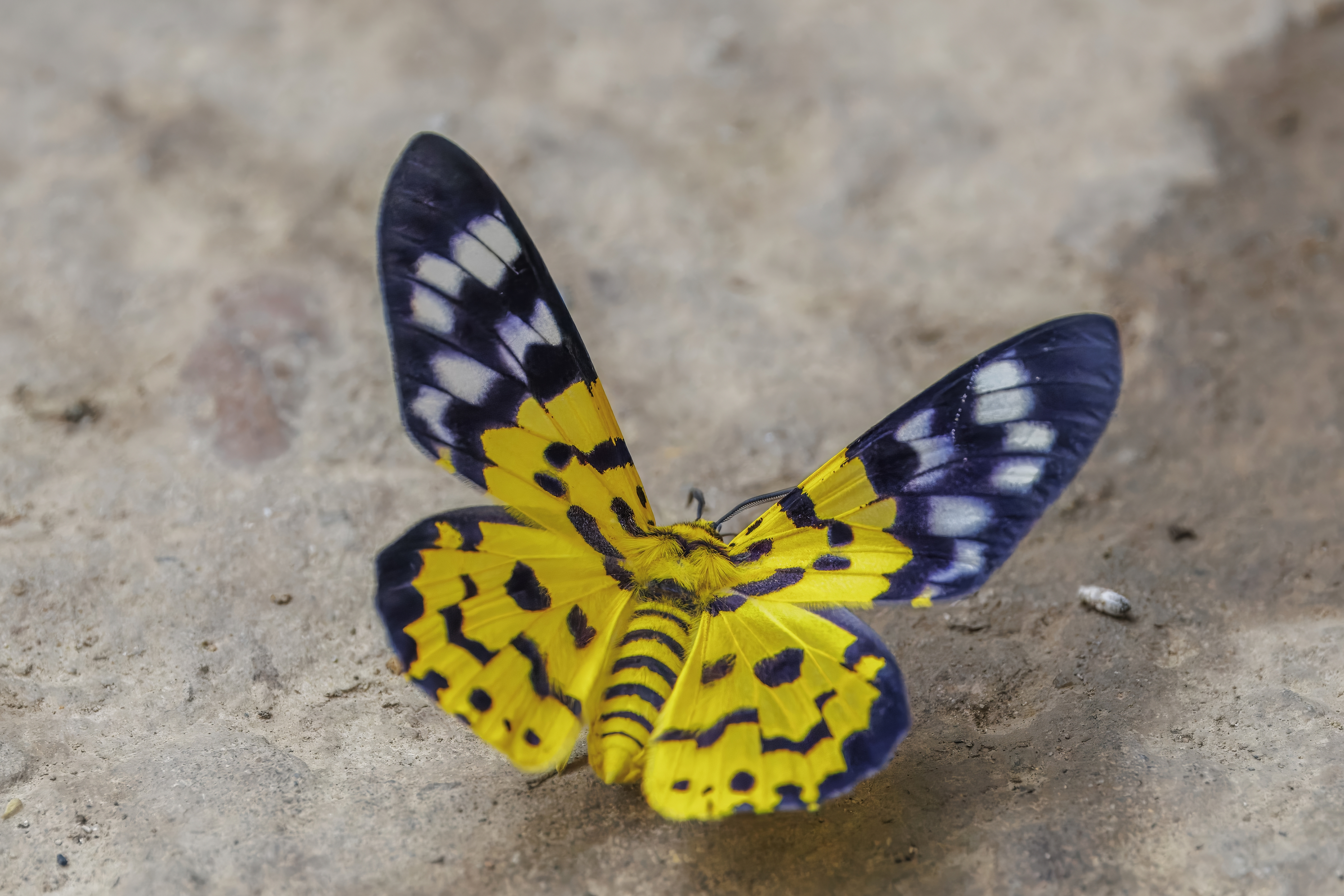

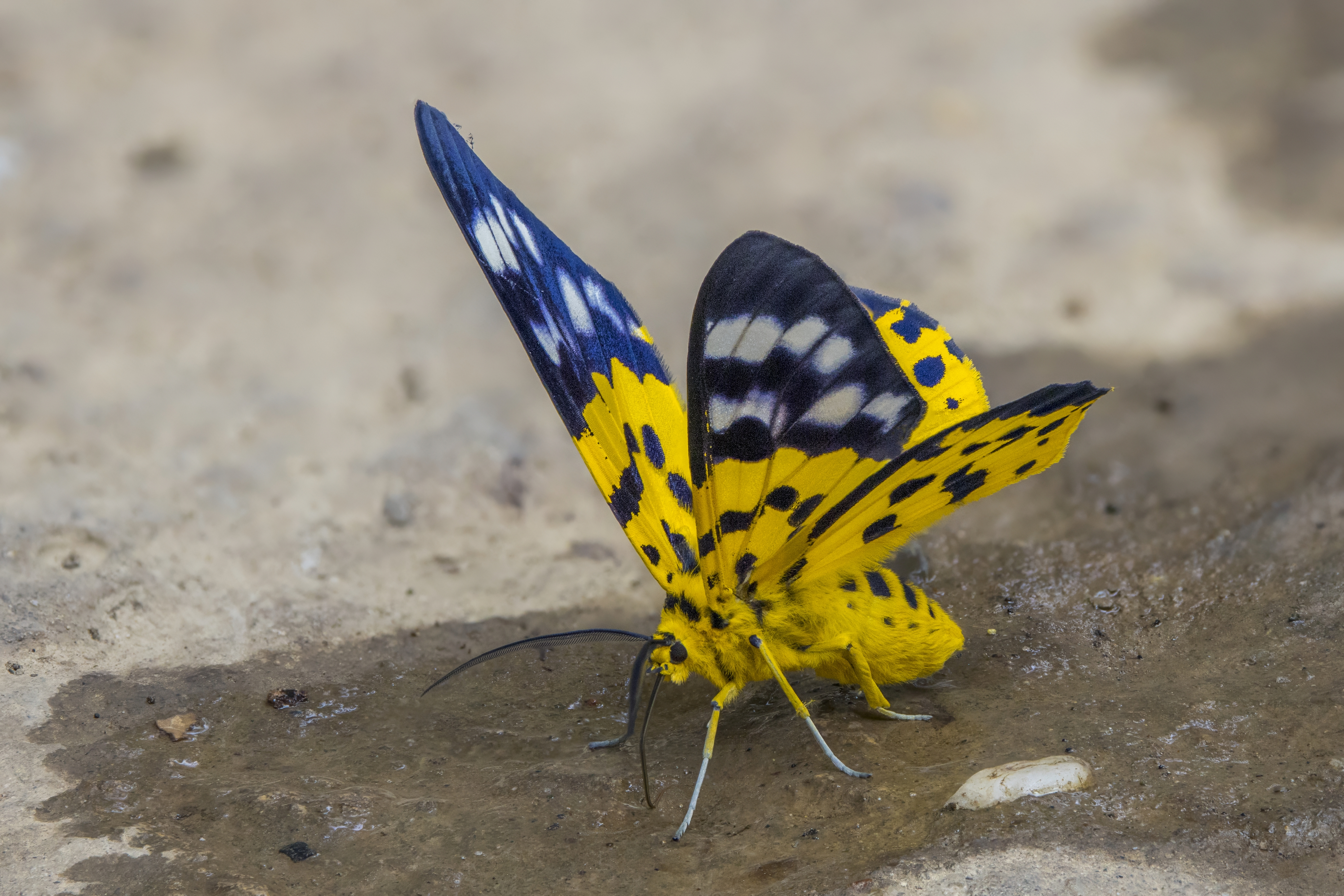
- In Laos

Scientific classification
- Kingdom: Animalia
- Phylum: Arthropoda
- Clade: Pancrustacea
- Class: Insecta
- Order: Lepidoptera
- Family: Geometridae
- Genus: Dysphania
- Species: D. militaris

Binomial name
- Dysphania militaris (Linnaeus, 1758)

Synonyms
- Phalaena militaris Linnaeus, 1758; Euschema abrupta Walker, 1862; Dysphania militaris abnegata Prout, 1917

= Dysphania militaris =

Species of moth

Dysphania militaris is a species of moth of the family Geometridae that is found from in the tropical regions of South and Southeast Asian countries such as China, India, Bangladesh Myanmar, Vietnam, Andaman Islands, Sumatra, Philippines and Java. It was first described by Carl Linnaeus in his 1758 10th edition of Systema Naturae.

== Description ==
Its wingspan is about 80–96 mm. Forewings of male produced, long and narrow. The fovea strongly developed. Head, thorax and abdomen golden yellowish with purplish bands. Forewings with golden-yellow basal half, the outer half deep purplish with its inner edge irregularly sinuous. Two oblique basal purple fascia, where the lower fascia sometimes having a spot detached from it. Two spots found on costa near base. There is an oblique antemedial series of three spots often conjoined. The outer area with two pale blue maculate bands, where the outer ending found at vein 3. Hindwings golden yellow, with a large purple discocellular spot and a spot below the cell. A postmedial lunulate band excurved between veins 3 and 5. A submarginal spot series becoming large conjoined lunulate patches at apex. The spots on the yellow area are very variable.

== Ecology and recognition ==
It flies during the day and because of its bright colours it is often mistaken for a butterfly. Several similar species, including Dysphania subrepleta, occur in the region and some are very closely related. Dysphania alloides, which was described from the Andaman Islands, was originally considered a subspecies.

Larvae have been reported to feed on Carallia species, Kandelia candel and Rhodomyrtus tomentosa plants.

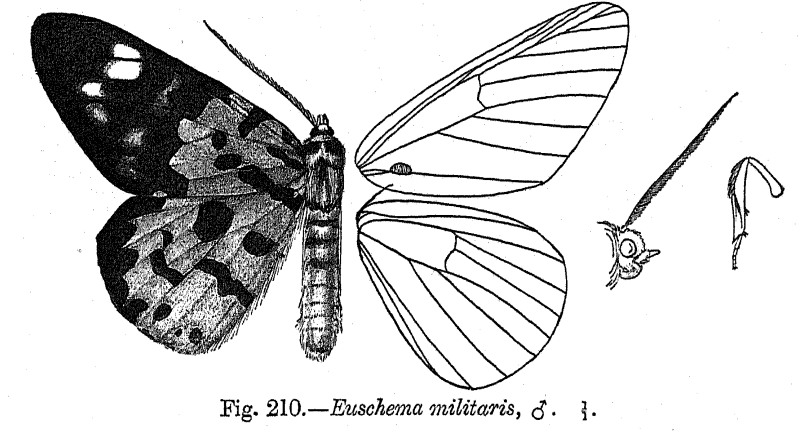
illustration as "Euschema militaris"
