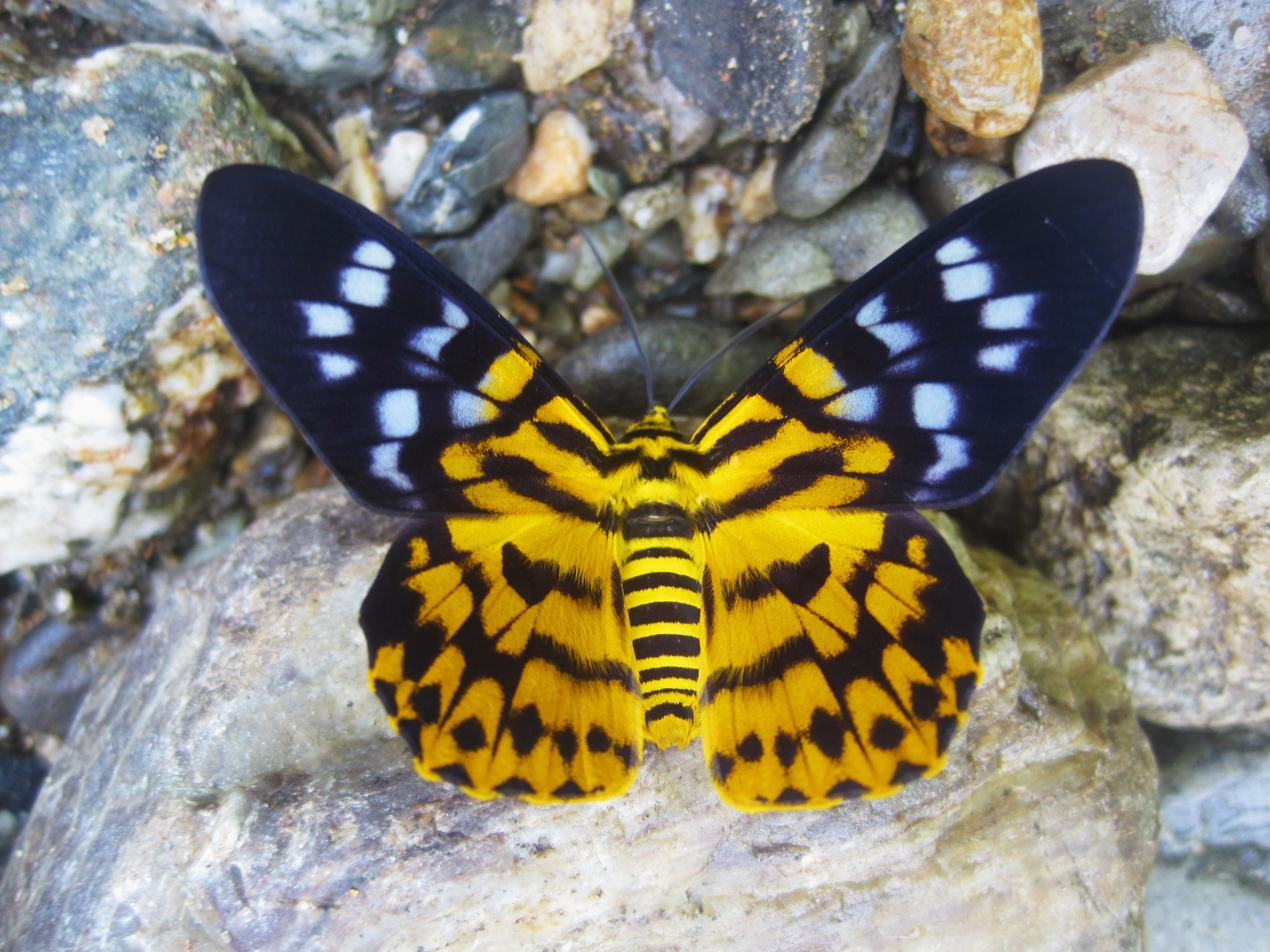

Scientific classification
- Kingdom: Animalia
- Phylum: Arthropoda
- Class: Insecta
- Order: Lepidoptera
- Family: Geometridae
- Genus: Dysphania
- Species: D. subrepleta

Binomial name
- Dysphania subrepleta (Walker, 1854)

Synonyms
- Euschema excubitor Moore, 1878; Euschema sodalis Moore, 1886; Euschemia subrepleta Walker, 1854; Hazis bellonaria Guenée, 1857

= Dysphania subrepleta =

Species of moth

Dysphania subrepleta is a species of false tiger moth (genus Dysphania) in the subfamily Geometrinae. Records are from Indo-China and western Malesia including Borneo, with no subspecies listed in the Catalogue of Life, where it is a "provisionally accepted name".

Moths in this genus may look alike: a similar species is Dysphania militaris.
