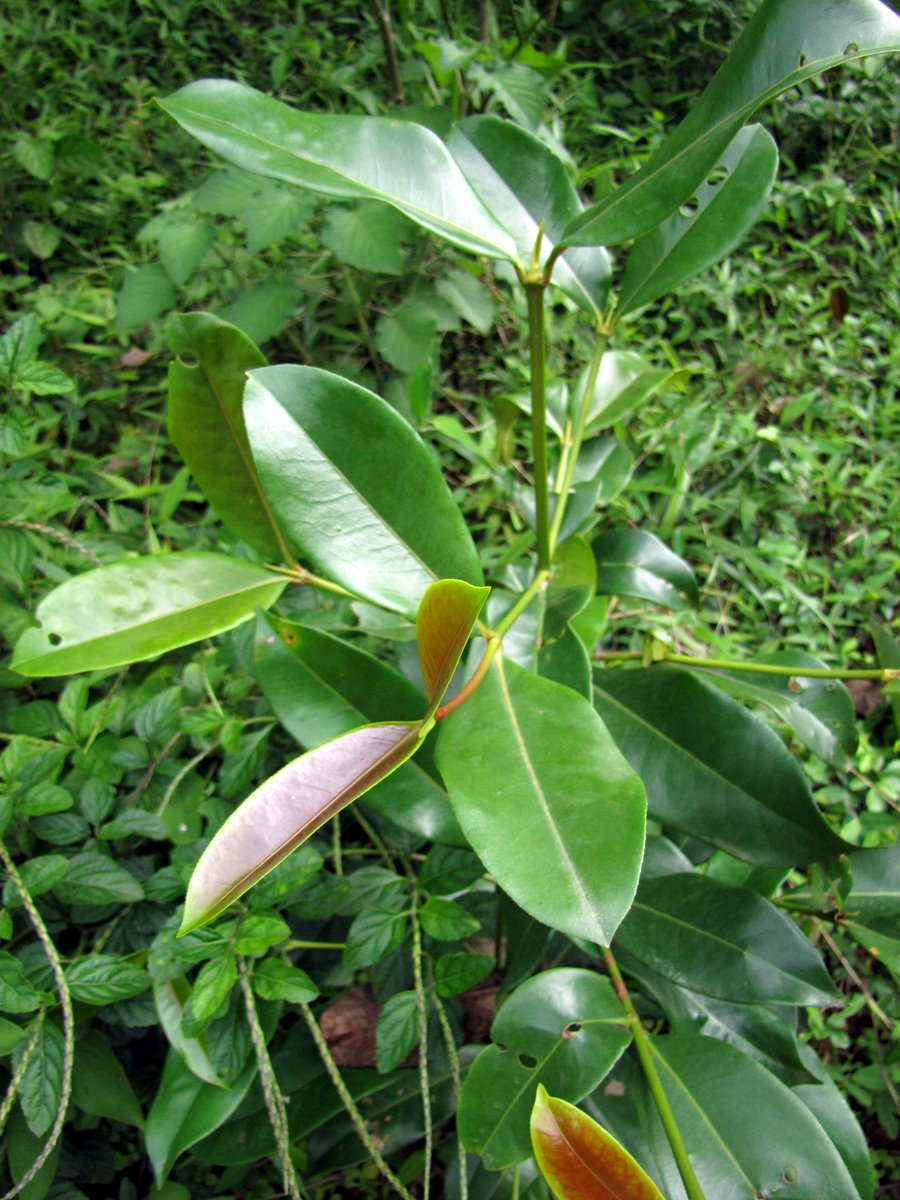
- Carallia brachiata

Scientific classification
- Kingdom: Plantae
- Clade: Tracheophytes
- Clade: Angiosperms
- Clade: Eudicots
- Clade: Rosids
- Order: Malpighiales
- Family: Rhizophoraceae
- Genus: Carallia; Roxb.

Species
- See text

Synonyms
- Baraultia Steud. ex Spreng.; Barraldeia Thouars; Demidofia Dennst.; Diatoma Lour.; Karekandel Wolf; Karekandelia Kuntze; Petalotoma DC.; Sagittipetalum Merr.; Symmetria Blume

= Carallia =

Genus of flowering plants

Carallia is a genus of trees in the family Rhizophoraceae.

== Description ==
Carallia species grow as small to medium-sized trees. Their leaves are often dotted black. The fruits are small and ellipsoid to roundish in shape.

== Distribution and habitat ==
Carallia species grow naturally in Madagascar, tropical Asia and northern Australia. Their habitat is lowland rainforests, swamps and on hills from sea level to about 2,000 metres (7,000 ft) elevation.

== Species ==
15 species are accepted.

- Carallia borneensis Oliv.
- Carallia brachiata (Lour.) Merr. - corkwood (butterfly plant)
- Carallia calophylloidea Ding Hou
- Carallia calycina Benth.
- Carallia coriifolia Ridl.
- Carallia diplopetala Hand.-Mazz.
- Carallia eugenioidea King (synonym C. euryoides Ridl.)
- Carallia garciniifolia F.C.How & F.C.Ho
- Carallia hulstijnii Valeton
- Carallia longipes Ding Hou
- Carallia orophila Kosterm.
- Carallia papuana Ding Hou
- Carallia paucinervia Kosterm.
- Carallia pectinifolia W.C.Ko
- Carallia suffruticosa Ridl.
