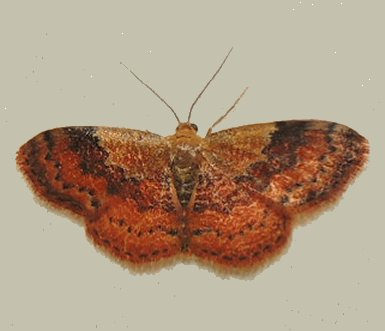
- Leptostales ferruminaria

Scientific classification
- Kingdom: Animalia
- Phylum: Arthropoda
- Class: Insecta
- Order: Lepidoptera
- Family: Geometridae
- Subfamily: Sterrhinae
- Tribe: Scopulini
- Genus: Leptostales; Moschler, 1890

Synonyms
- Calyptocome Warren, 1900; Scelolophia Hulst, 1896; Wauchula Hulst, 1900; Xystrota Hulst, 1896

= Leptostales =

Genus of geometer moths (Geometridae) in subfamily Sterrhinae

Leptostales is a genus of moths in the family Geometridae.

== Species ==
The genus includes the following species:

- Leptostales adela (Dognin, 1890)
- Leptostales adita (Prout, 1938)
- Leptostales admirabilis (Oberthur, 1883)
- Leptostales amechana (Dyar, 1913)
- Leptostales angulata (Schaus, 1912)
- Leptostales aphilotima (Prout, 1938)
- Leptostales catagompha (Dyar, 1913)
- Leptostales cazeca (Druce, 1892)
- Leptostales concoloraria (Dognin, 1890)
- Leptostales crossii (Hulst, 1900)
- Leptostales damaria (Schaus, 1901)
- Leptostales delectabiliaria (Moschler, 1890)
- Leptostales delila (Schaus, 1912)
- Leptostales desmogramma (Dyar, 1913)
- Leptostales domarita (Schaus, 1940)
- Leptostales exaeta (Prout, 1918)
- Leptostales ferruminaria (Zeller, 1872)
- Leptostales gerocoma (Dyar, 1913)
- Leptostales grays (Prout, 1938)
- Leptostales griseocostata (Warren, 1904)
- Leptostales hegeter (Dyar, 1913)
- Leptostales hepaticaria (Guenee, 1857)
- Leptostales intamiataria (Moschler, 1890)
- Leptostales laevitaria (Geyer, 1837)
- Leptostales littoralis (Prout, 1920)
- Leptostales noctuata (Guenee, 1858)
- Leptostales nycteis (Druce, 1892)
- Leptostales oblinataria Moschler, 1890
- Leptostales olivaceata (Warren, 1901)
- Leptostales oslinaria (Schaus, 1940)
- Leptostales pannaria (Guenee, 1857)
- Leptostales pappasaria (Dyar, 1913)
- Leptostales penthemaria (Dyar, 1913)
- Leptostales penumbrata (Warren, 1900)
- Leptostales phorcaria (Guenee, 1858)
- Leptostales phyrctaria (Dyar, 1913)
- Leptostales praepeditaria Moschler, 1890
- Leptostales psecasta (Prout, 1938)
- Leptostales ptyctographa (Dyar, 1913)
- Leptostales pulida (Dognin, 1893)
- Leptostales purpurata (Warren, 1906)
- Leptostales randaria (Schaus, 1940)
- Leptostales rectimargo (Dyar, 1913)
- Leptostales rivularia (Dyar, 1913)
- Leptostales roseoliva (Warren, 1900)
- Leptostales rubromarginaria (Packard, 1871)
- Leptostales rubrotincta (Hulst, 1900)
- Leptostales subrosea (Warren, 1905)
- Leptostales subroseata (Guenee, 1858)
- Leptostales subrubella (Warren, 1906)
- Leptostales terminata (Guenee, 1858)
- Leptostales turbata (Walker, 1863)
- Leptostales uniformata (Warren, 1900)
- Leptostales virgota (Schaus, 1901)
- Leptostales vitticostata (Warren, 1906)
