= Leptostales hepaticaria =

Scientific classification
- Kingdom: Animalia
- Phylum: Arthropoda
- Class: Insecta
- Order: Lepidoptera
- Family: Geometridae
- Tribe: Scopulini
- Genus: Leptostales
- Species: L. hepaticaria

Binomial name
- Leptostales hepaticaria (Guenée in Boisduval & Guenée, 1858)

Species of moth

Leptostales hepaticaria is a species of geometrid moth in the family Geometridae.

The MONA or Hodges number for Leptostales hepaticaria is 7175.
