= Somatina eurymitra =

Scientific classification
- Kingdom: Animalia
- Phylum: Arthropoda
- Class: Insecta
- Order: Lepidoptera
- Family: Geometridae
- Genus: Somatina
- Species: S. eurymitra

Binomial name
- Somatina eurymitra Turner, 1926

Species of moth

Somatina eurymitra is a moth of the family Geometridae. It is found in Australia (Queensland).
