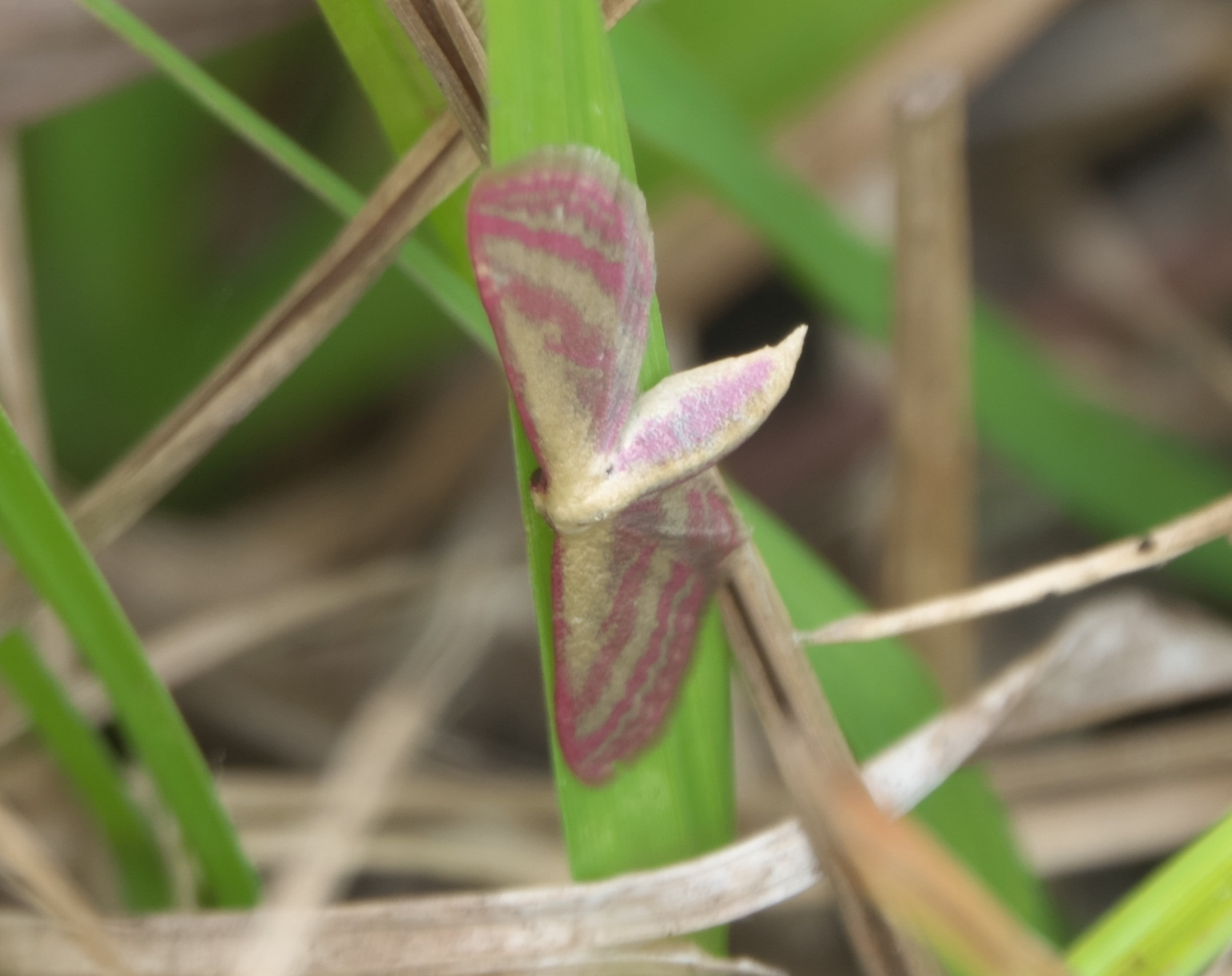
- Leptostales laevitaria, Florida

Scientific classification
- Domain: Eukaryota
- Kingdom: Animalia
- Phylum: Arthropoda
- Class: Insecta
- Order: Lepidoptera
- Family: Geometridae
- Genus: Leptostales
- Species: L. laevitaria

Binomial name
- Leptostales laevitaria (Geyer, 1837)

= Leptostales laevitaria =

Species of moth

Leptostales laevitaria, the raspberry wave moth, is a species of moth in the family Geometridae (the geometer moths). It was first described by Geyer in 1837 and it is found in North America.

The MONA or Hodges number for Leptostales laevitaria is 7177.
