= Somatina macroanthophilata =

Scientific classification
- Kingdom: Animalia
- Phylum: Arthropoda
- Class: Insecta
- Order: Lepidoptera
- Family: Geometridae
- Genus: Somatina
- Species: S. macroanthophilata

Binomial name
- Somatina macroanthophilata Xue, 1992

Species of moth

Somatina macroanthophilata is a moth of the family Geometridae. It is found in China.
