= Somatina purpurascens =

Scientific classification
- Kingdom: Animalia
- Phylum: Arthropoda
- Class: Insecta
- Order: Lepidoptera
- Family: Geometridae
- Genus: Somatina
- Species: S. purpurascens

Binomial name
- Somatina purpurascens Moore, [1887]

Species of moth

Somatina purpurascens is a moth of the family Geometridae first described by Frederic Moore in 1887. It is found in Sri Lanka.

== Description ==
The wingspan is about 34 mm in the male and 36 mm in the female. The antennae of the male are finely ciliated. The hindleg of the male is small. The tibia is dilated with a fold and large tuft of long hair. It is a whitish moth with slight rufous and fuscous suffusion. The head is blackish. The forewings have a rusty costa. A medial sinuous line is present, which is angled below the costa, with another line beyond it produced to points beyond the angles of cell and approaching the medial line below the cell, the area between them usually tinged with rufous and with a cell-spot. There is a sub-marginal waved line produced to a point below costa, then usually obsolescent, the area beyond it rufous as far as the marginal rufous band of triangular marks, which does not extend to the costa. Hindwings with cell-speck and traces of waved medial and postmedial line. The outer area fuscous, with marginal series of triangular rufous marks.
