= Somatina nigridiscata =

Scientific classification
- Kingdom: Animalia
- Phylum: Arthropoda
- Class: Insecta
- Order: Lepidoptera
- Family: Geometridae
- Genus: Somatina
- Species: S. nigridiscata

Binomial name
- Somatina nigridiscata (Warren, 1896)

Synonyms
- Somatinopsis nigridiscata Warren, 1896

Species of moth

Somatina nigridiscata is a moth of the family Geometridae. It is found on Java.
