= Somatina prouti =

Scientific classification
- Kingdom: Animalia
- Phylum: Arthropoda
- Class: Insecta
- Order: Lepidoptera
- Family: Geometridae
- Genus: Somatina
- Species: S. prouti

Binomial name
- Somatina prouti Janse, 1934

Species of moth

Somatina prouti is a moth of the family Geometridae. It is found in South Africa.
