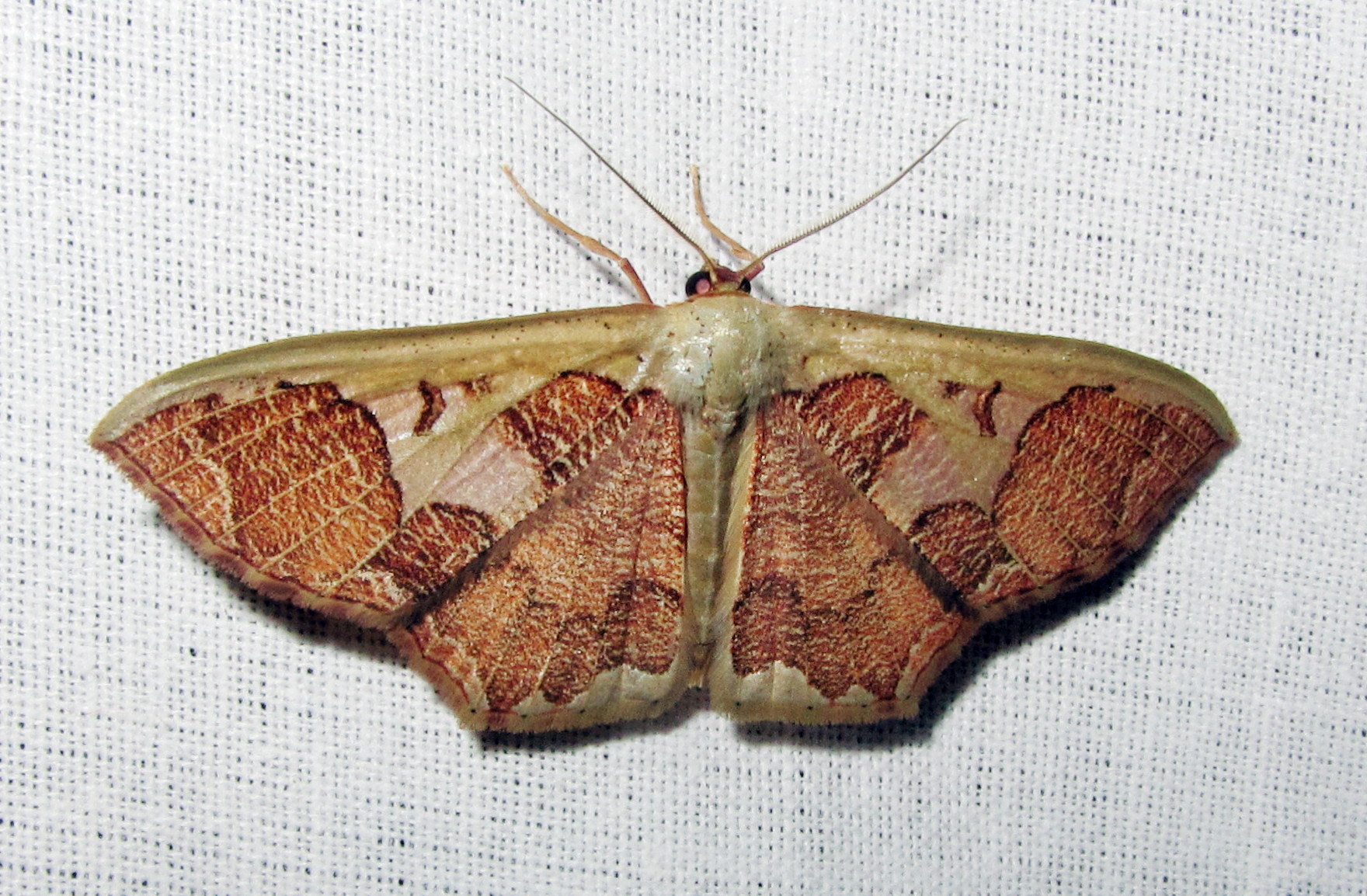

Scientific classification
- Kingdom: Animalia
- Phylum: Arthropoda
- Clade: Pancrustacea
- Class: Insecta
- Order: Lepidoptera
- Family: Geometridae
- Genus: Zythos
- Species: Z. avellanea

Binomial name
- Zythos avellanea (Prout, 1932)

Synonyms
- Nobilia avellanea Prout, 1932

= Zythos avellanea =

Species of moth

Zythos avellanea is a moth of the family Geometridae. It is found from the north-eastern part of the Himalaya to Taiwan, Sumatra and Borneo.
