= Somatina accraria =

Scientific classification
- Kingdom: Animalia
- Phylum: Arthropoda
- Class: Insecta
- Order: Lepidoptera
- Family: Geometridae
- Genus: Somatina
- Species: S. accraria

Binomial name
- Somatina accraria C. Swinhoe, 1904

Species of moth

Somatina accraria is a moth of the family Geometridae first described by Charles Swinhoe in 1904. It is found in Ghana.
