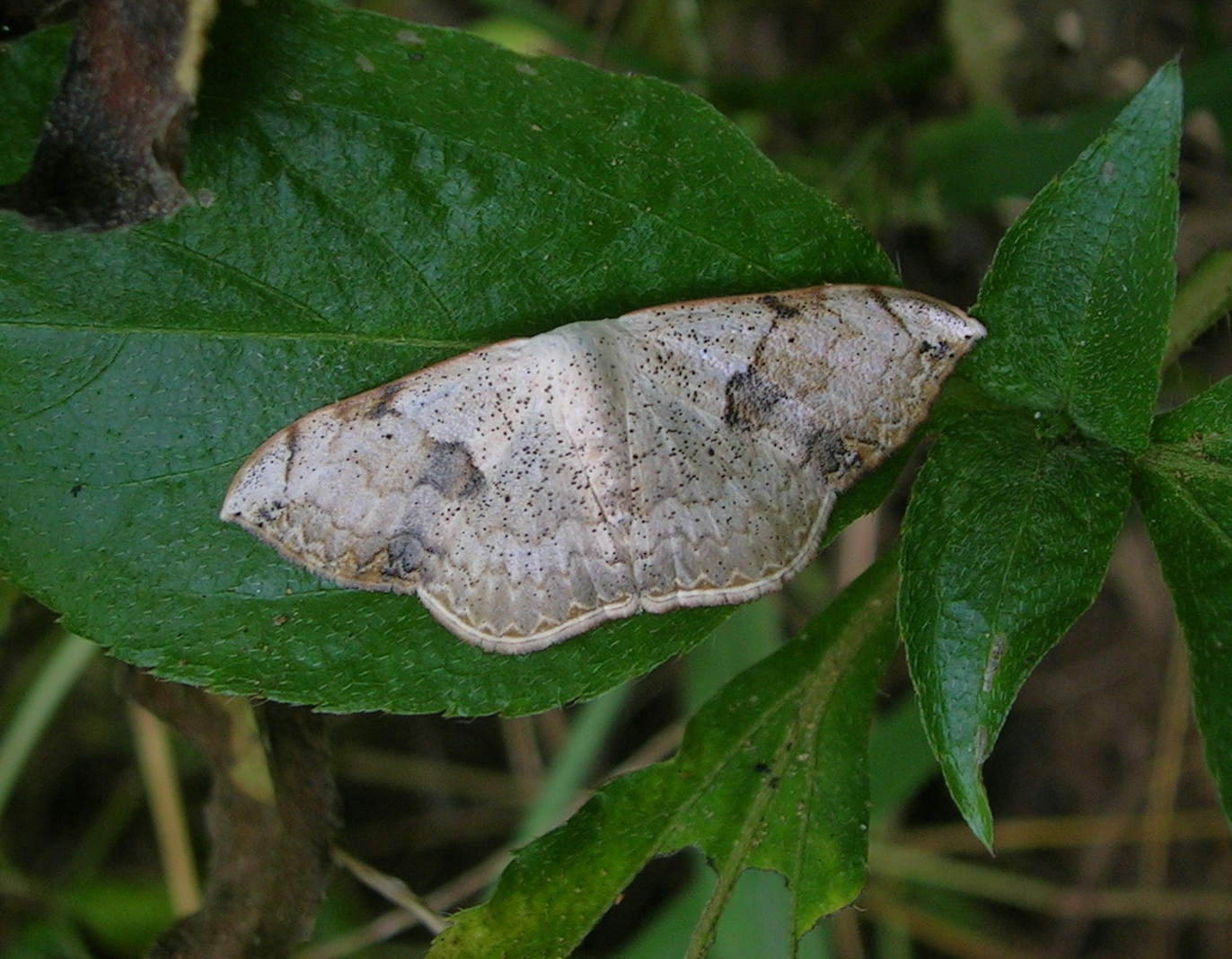
- Somatina cf. plynusaria

Scientific classification
- Kingdom: Animalia
- Phylum: Arthropoda
- Class: Insecta
- Order: Lepidoptera
- Family: Geometridae
- Tribe: Scopulini
- Genus: Somatina; Guenée, [1858]

Synonyms
- Nebessa Walker, 1869; Somatinopsis Warren, 1896; Somatodes Guenée, [1858]

= Somatina =

Genus of moths

Somatina is a genus of moths in the family Geometridae first described by Achille Guenée in 1858.

== Description ==
The genus is similar to Problepsis, but differs in that the antennae of the male usually being ciliated. Forewings with vein 10 arising from veins 7, 8 and 9 anastomosing (fusing) with vein 11, and then with veins 8 and 9 to form a double areole.

== Species ==
- Somatina accraria Swinhoe, 1904
- Somatina anthophilata Guenée, [1858]
- Somatina apicipuncta Prout, 1915
- Somatina centrofasciaria (Leech, 1897)
- Somatina chalyboeata (Walker, 1869)
- Somatina ctenophora Prout, 1915
- Somatina densifasciaria Inoue, 1992
- Somatina discata Warren, 1909
- Somatina eurymitra Turner, 1926
- Somatina figurata Warren, 1897
- Somatina fletcheri Herbulot, 1958
- Somatina fraus Prout, 1916
- Somatina fungifera Warren, 1909
- Somatina hombergi Herbulot, 1967
- Somatina impunctulata (Warren, 1901)
- Somatina ioscia Prout, 1932
- Somatina irregularis (Warren, 1898)
- Somatina lemairei Herbulot, 1978
- Somatina lia Prout, 1915
- Somatina macroanthophilata Xue, 1992
- Somatina maeandrata Prout, 1925
- Somatina mozambica (Thierry-Mieg, 1905)
- Somatina nigridiscata (Warren, 1896)
- Somatina obscuriciliata Wehrli, 1924
- Somatina omicraria (Fabricius, 1798)
- Somatina ossicolor Warren, 1898
- Somatina plynusaria (Walker, [1863])
- Somatina postlineata (Warren, 1899)
- Somatina probleptica Prout, 1917
- Somatina prouti Janse, 1934
- Somatina purpurascens Moore, [1887]
- Somatina pythiaria (Guenée, [1858])
- Somatina rhodochila Prout, 1932
- Somatina rosacea Swinhoe, 1894
- Somatina rufifascia Warren, 1896
- Somatina sanctithomae Herbulot, 1958
- Somatina sedata Prout, 1922
- Somatina sublucens (Warren, 1907)
- Somatina subviridata (Warren, 1901)
- Somatina syneorus Prout, 1915
- Somatina transvehens Prout, 1918
- Somatina vestalis (Butler, 1875)
- Somatina virginalis Prout, 1917
- Somatina wiltshirei Prout, 1938
