= Somatina sublucens =

Scientific classification
- Kingdom: Animalia
- Phylum: Arthropoda
- Class: Insecta
- Order: Lepidoptera
- Family: Geometridae
- Genus: Somatina
- Species: S. sublucens

Binomial name
- Somatina sublucens (Warren, 1907)

Synonyms
- Organopoda sublucens Warren, 1907

Species of moth

Somatina sublucens is a moth of the family Geometridae. It is found in New Guinea.
