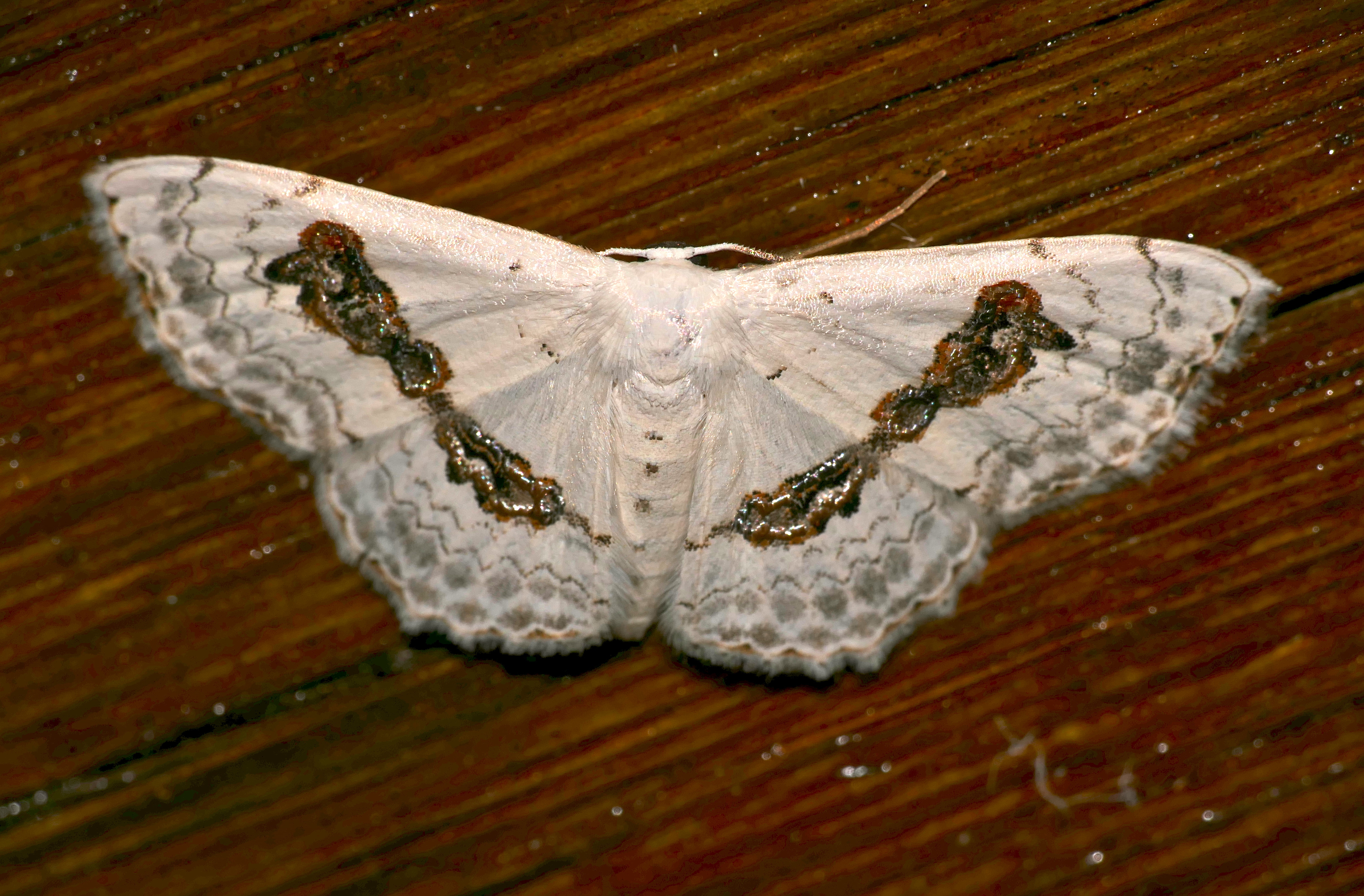

Scientific classification
- Kingdom: Animalia
- Phylum: Arthropoda
- Class: Insecta
- Order: Lepidoptera
- Family: Geometridae
- Genus: Somatina
- Species: S. vestalis

Binomial name
- Somatina vestalis (Butler, 1875)

Synonyms
- Argyris vestalis Butler, 1875

= Somatina vestalis =

Species of moth

Somatina vestalis is a moth of the family Geometridae. It is found in Kenya, Malawi, Mozambique, South Africa, Zambia and Zimbabwe.
