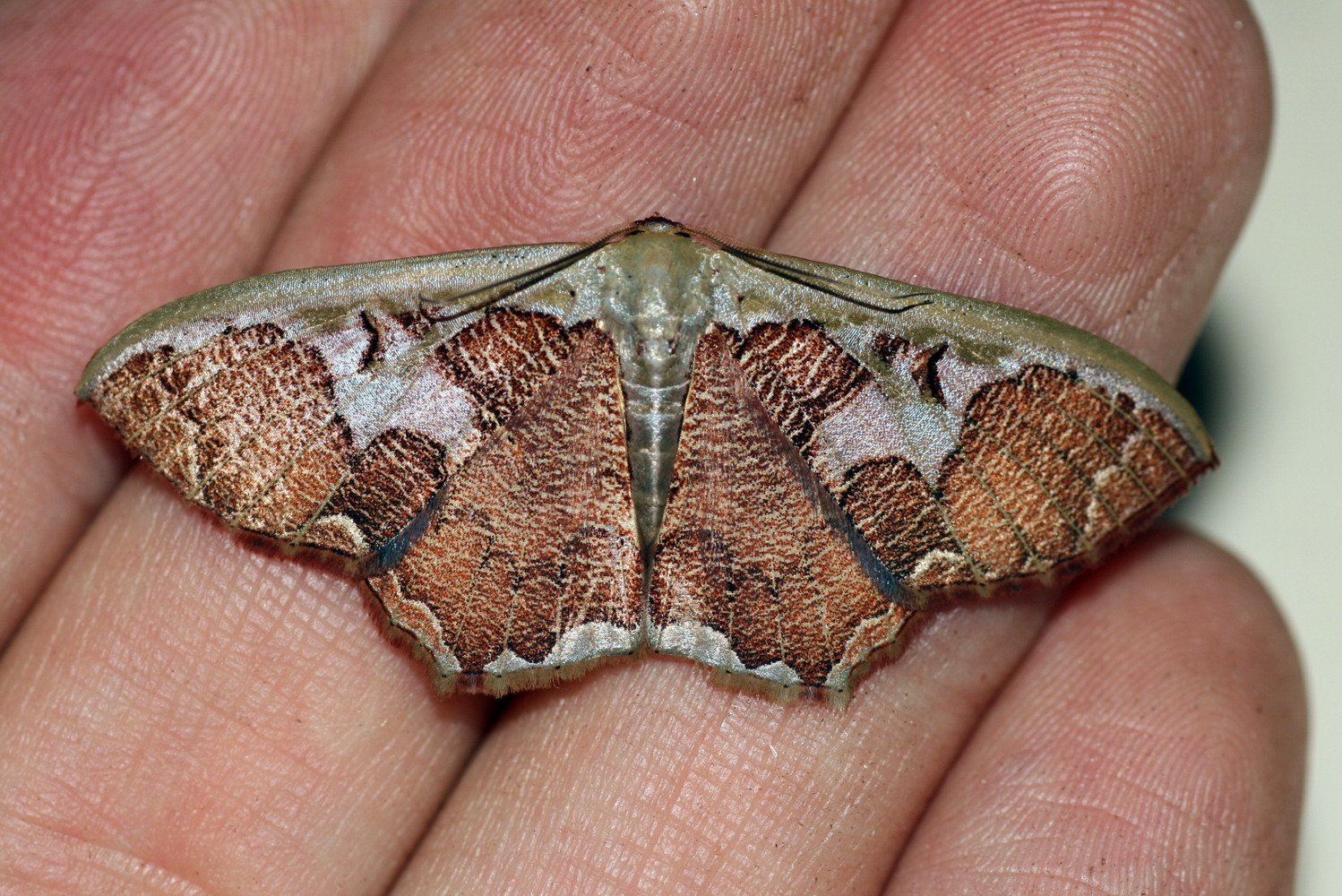
- Zythos turbata

Scientific classification
- Kingdom: Animalia
- Phylum: Arthropoda
- Class: Insecta
- Order: Lepidoptera
- Family: Geometridae
- Tribe: Scopulini
- Genus: Zythos; Fletcher, 1979

Synonyms
- Nobilia Walker, 1861 (Preocc.)

= Zythos =

Genus of moths

Zythos is a genus of moths in the family Geometridae. It was described by David Stephen Fletcher in 1979.

== Species ==
- Zythos aphrodite (Prout, 1932)
- Zythos avellanea (Prout, 1932)
- Zythos clypeata Yazaki, 1996
- Zythos cupreata (Pagenstecher, 1888)
- Zythos erotica (Prout, 1932)
- Zythos fastigata (Prout, 1938)
- Zythos modesta Yazaki, 1996
- Zythos molybdina (Prout, 1938)
- Zythos obliterata (Warren, 1897)
- Zythos strigata (Warren, 1896)
- Zythos turbata (Walker, 1862)(type-species)
