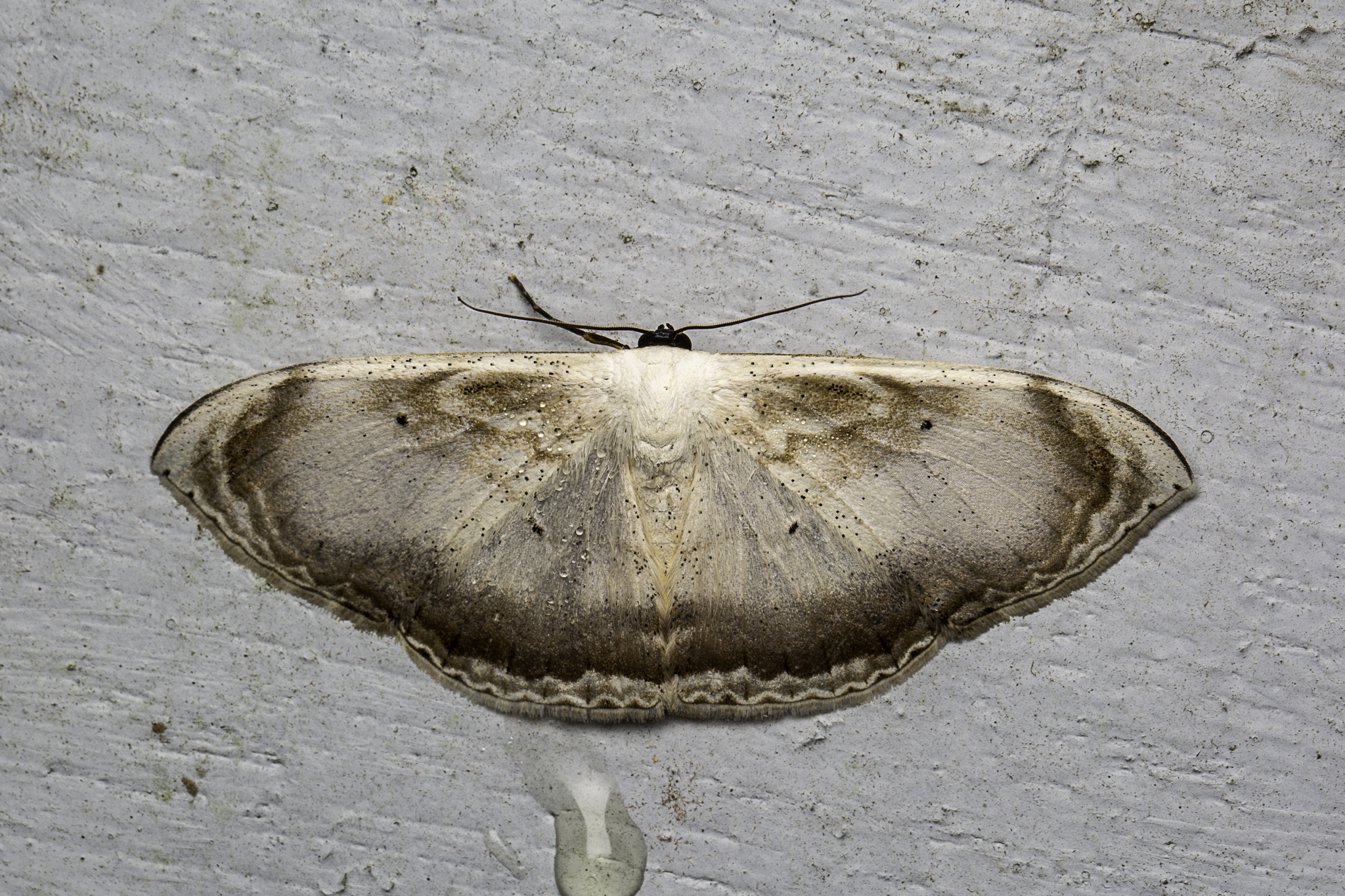

Scientific classification
- Kingdom: Animalia
- Phylum: Arthropoda
- Class: Insecta
- Order: Lepidoptera
- Family: Geometridae
- Genus: Somatina
- Species: S. densifasciaria

Binomial name
- Somatina densifasciaria Inoue, 1992

= Somatina densifasciaria =

Species of moth

Somatina densifasciaria is a moth of the family Geometridae. It is found in Thailand.
