= Somatina subviridata =

Scientific classification
- Kingdom: Animalia
- Phylum: Arthropoda
- Class: Insecta
- Order: Lepidoptera
- Family: Geometridae
- Genus: Somatina
- Species: S. subviridata

Binomial name
- Somatina subviridata (Warren, 1901)

Synonyms
- Problepsis subviridata Warren, 1901

Species of moth

Somatina subviridata is a moth of the family Geometridae. It is found in Sierra Leone.
