= Somatina chalyboeata =

Scientific classification
- Kingdom: Animalia
- Phylum: Arthropoda
- Class: Insecta
- Order: Lepidoptera
- Family: Geometridae
- Genus: Somatina
- Species: S. chalyboeata

Binomial name
- Somatina chalyboeata (Walker, 1869)

Synonyms
- Nebessa chalyboeata Walker 1869; Somatina chalybeata

Species of moth

Somatina chalyboeata is a moth of the family Geometridae. It is found in the Democratic Republic of Congo and Ghana.
