= Somatina rosacea =

Scientific classification
- Kingdom: Animalia
- Phylum: Arthropoda
- Class: Insecta
- Order: Lepidoptera
- Family: Geometridae
- Genus: Somatina
- Species: S. rosacea

Binomial name
- Somatina rosacea C. Swinhoe, 1894

Species of moth

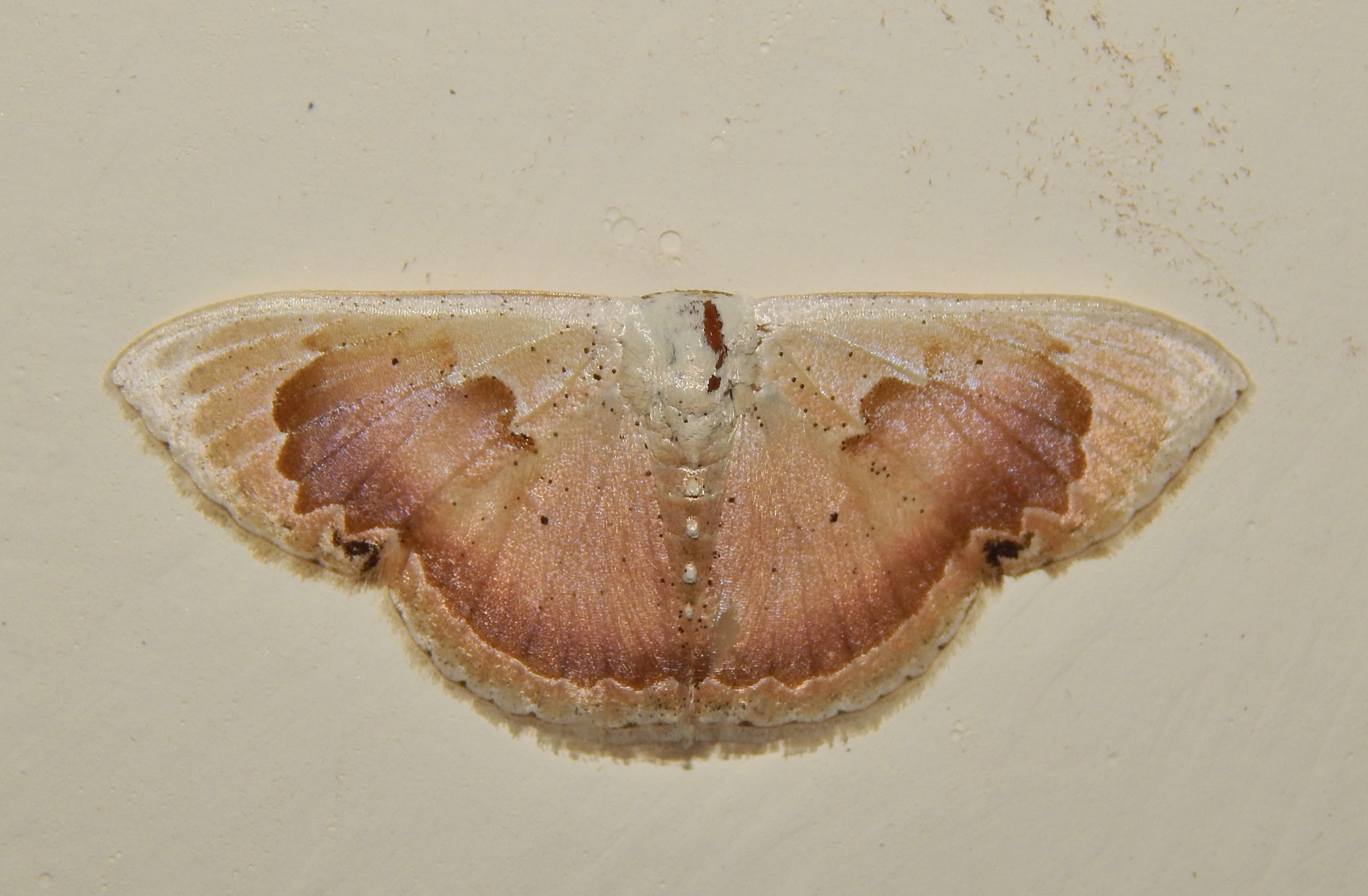

Somatina rosacea is a moth of the family Geometridae first described by Charles Swinhoe in 1894. It is found in northeast India's Khasi Hills and in Taiwan.

== Subspecies ==
- Somatina rosacea rosacea (India)
- Somatina rosacea anaemica Prout, 1914 (Taiwan)
