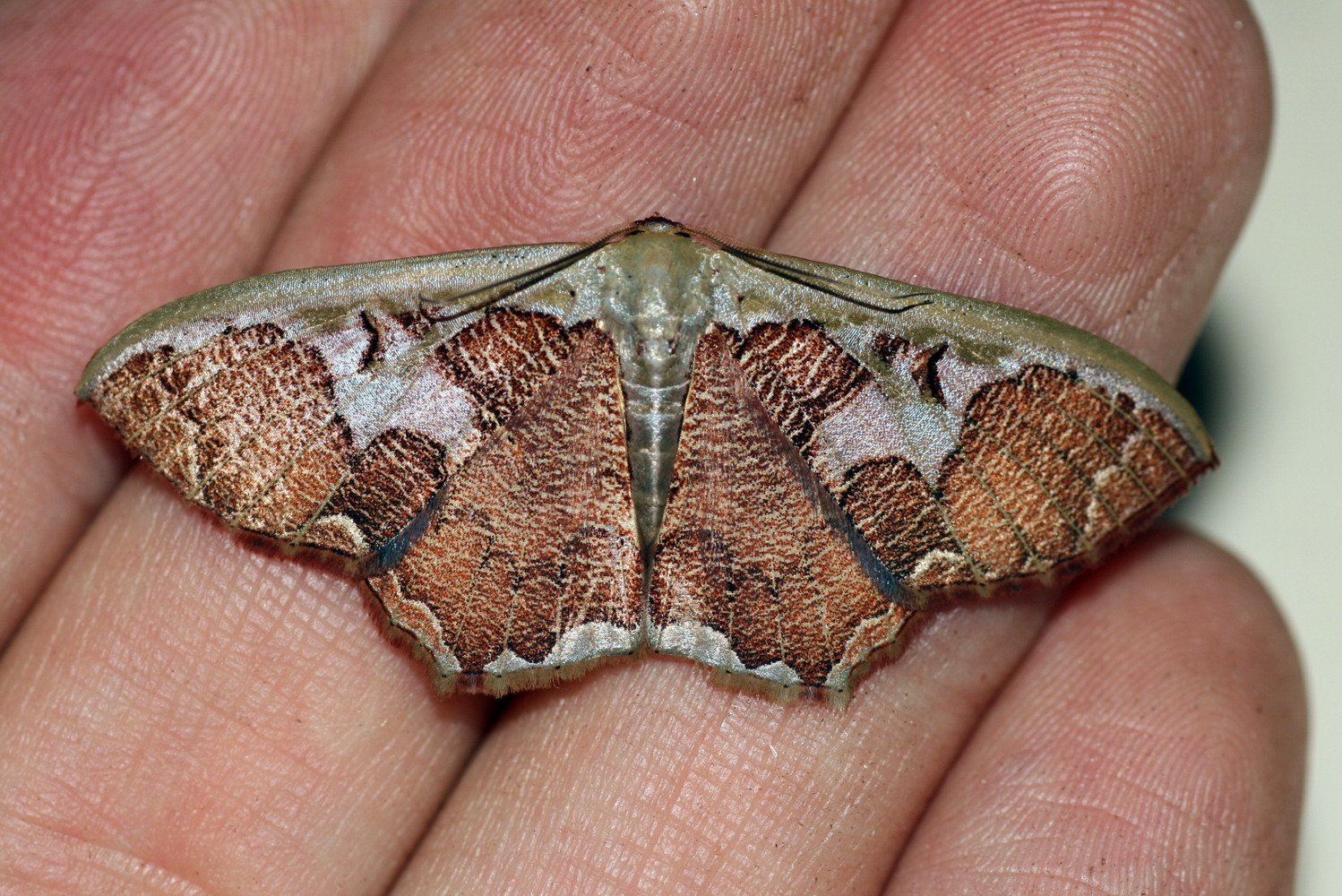

Scientific classification
- Kingdom: Animalia
- Phylum: Arthropoda
- Class: Insecta
- Order: Lepidoptera
- Family: Geometridae
- Genus: Zythos
- Species: Z. turbata

Binomial name
- Zythos turbata (Walker, 1862)

Synonyms
- Nobilia turbata Walker, 1862; Plutodes strigularia Snellen, 1886

= Zythos turbata =

Species of moth

Zythos turbata is a moth of the family Geometridae first described by Francis Walker in 1862. It is found in southern Myanmar and on Borneo, Sumatra, Java, Peninsular Malaysia and the Philippines (Mindanao, Mindoro, Palawan, Tawi-Tawi Island).
