= Somatina figurata =

Scientific classification
- Kingdom: Animalia
- Phylum: Arthropoda
- Class: Insecta
- Order: Lepidoptera
- Family: Geometridae
- Genus: Somatina
- Species: S. figurata

Binomial name
- Somatina figurata Warren, 1897

Synonyms
- Somatina rufitacta Warren, 1905

Species of moth

Somatina figurata is a moth of the family Geometridae. It is found on Madagascar and in Kenya, South Africa and Uganda.

== Subspecies ==
- Somatina figurata figurata (Kenya, South Africa)
- Somatina figurata candida Prout, 1932 (Madagascar)
- Somatina figurata transfigurata Prout, 1922 (Uganda)
