= Somatina fungifera =

Scientific classification
- Kingdom: Animalia
- Phylum: Arthropoda
- Class: Insecta
- Order: Lepidoptera
- Family: Geometridae
- Genus: Somatina
- Species: S. fungifera

Binomial name
- Somatina fungifera Warren, 1909

Species of moth

Somatina fungifera is a moth of the family Geometridae. It is found in the Democratic Republic of Congo.
