= Zythos erotica =

Scientific classification
- Kingdom: Animalia
- Phylum: Arthropoda
- Clade: Pancrustacea
- Class: Insecta
- Order: Lepidoptera
- Family: Geometridae
- Genus: Zythos
- Species: Z. erotica

Binomial name
- Zythos erotica (L. B. Prout, 1932)

Synonyms
- Nobilia erotica Prout, 1932

Species of moth

Zythos erotica is a moth of the family Geometridae first described by Louis Beethoven Prout in 1932. It is found on Sulawesi.
