= Somatina postlineata =

Scientific classification
- Kingdom: Animalia
- Phylum: Arthropoda
- Class: Insecta
- Order: Lepidoptera
- Family: Geometridae
- Genus: Somatina
- Species: S. postlineata

Binomial name
- Somatina postlineata (Warren, 1899)

Synonyms
- Leptomeris postlineata Warren, 1899

Species of moth

Somatina postlineata is a moth of the family Geometridae. It is found in India.
