= Somatina transvehens =

Scientific classification
- Kingdom: Animalia
- Phylum: Arthropoda
- Clade: Pancrustacea
- Class: Insecta
- Order: Lepidoptera
- Family: Geometridae
- Genus: Somatina
- Species: S. transvehens

Binomial name
- Somatina transvehens Prout, 1918

Species of moth

Somatina transvehens is a moth of the family Geometridae. It is found in China (Hainan).
