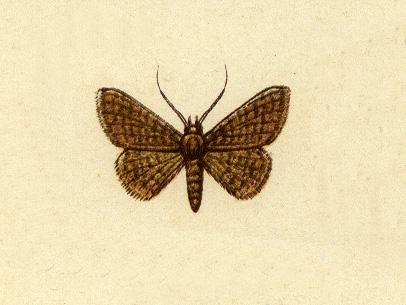

Scientific classification
- Domain: Eukaryota
- Kingdom: Animalia
- Phylum: Arthropoda
- Class: Insecta
- Order: Lepidoptera
- Family: Geometridae
- Genus: Leptostales
- Species: L. oblinataria

Binomial name
- Leptostales oblinataria Moschler, 1890

Synonyms
- Acratodes oblinataria; Leptostales scintillans Warren, 1904

= Leptostales oblinataria =

Species of moth

Leptostales oblinataria is a moth of the family Geometridae. It is found in Florida, Puerto Rico, Jamaica and Guyana.

The wingspan is about 18 mm. Subspecies scintillans is more brownish-tinged than the nominate subspecies.

== Subspecies ==
- Leptostales oblinataria oblinataria
- Leptostales oblinataria scintillans Warren, 1904
