= Isoplenodia arabukoensis =

Scientific classification
- Kingdom: Animalia
- Phylum: Arthropoda
- Class: Insecta
- Order: Lepidoptera
- Family: Geometridae
- Genus: Isoplenodia
- Species: I. arabukoensis

Binomial name
- Isoplenodia arabukoensis Sihvonen & Staude, 2010

Species of moth

Isoplenodia arabukoensis is a moth of the family Geometridae. It is found in south-eastern Kenya, central Zimbabwe and south-western Rwanda.
