= Zythos obliterata =

Scientific classification
- Kingdom: Animalia
- Phylum: Arthropoda
- Class: Insecta
- Order: Lepidoptera
- Family: Geometridae
- Genus: Zythos
- Species: Z. obliterata

Binomial name
- Zythos obliterata (Warren, 1897)

Synonyms
- Nobilia obliterata Warren, 1897; Omiza simplaria Snellen, 1899

Species of moth

Zythos obliterata is a moth of the family Geometridae described by William Warren in 1897. It is found on Borneo, Peninsular Malaysia and Sumatra. The habitat consists of lowland alluvial forests, secondary forests and dry heath forests.
