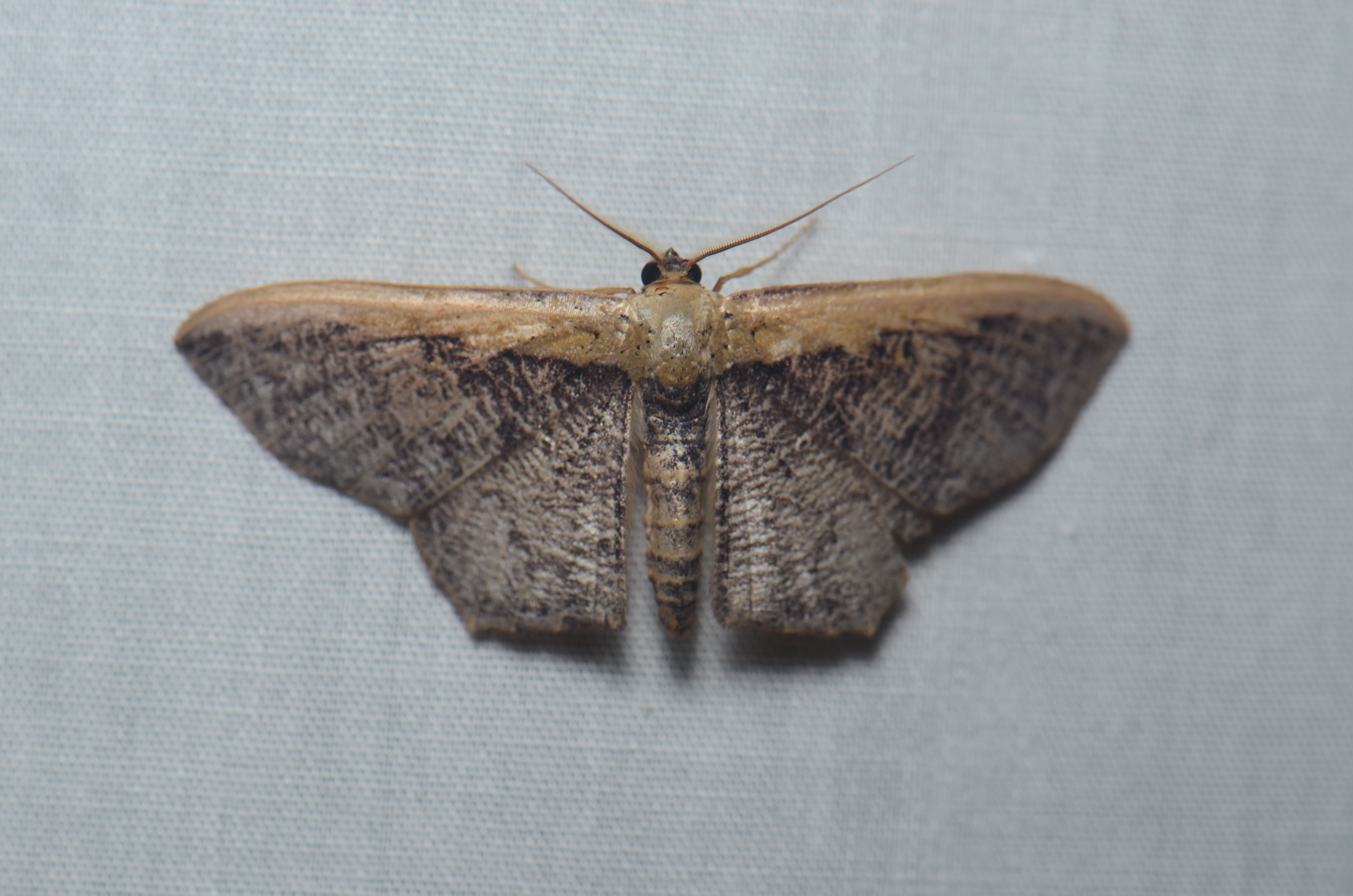

Scientific classification
- Kingdom: Animalia
- Phylum: Arthropoda
- Class: Insecta
- Order: Lepidoptera
- Family: Geometridae
- Genus: Zythos
- Species: Z. strigata

Binomial name
- Zythos strigata (Warren, 1896)

Synonyms
- Nobilia strigata Warren, 1896; Nobilia strigata rubescens Prout, 1938

= Zythos strigata =

Species of moth

Zythos strigata is a moth of the family Geometridae first described by William Warren in 1896. It is found on Peninsular Malaysia, Borneo, Java, Bali and Palawan and Balabac Island in the Philippines.

== Subspecies ==
- Zythos strigata strigata (Palawan)
- Zythos strigata rubescens (Prout, 1938) (Bali)
