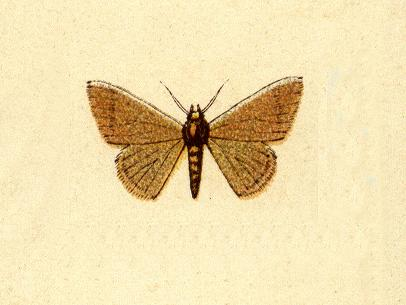

Scientific classification
- Domain: Eukaryota
- Kingdom: Animalia
- Phylum: Arthropoda
- Class: Insecta
- Order: Lepidoptera
- Family: Geometridae
- Genus: Leptostales
- Species: L. roseoliva

Binomial name
- Leptostales roseoliva (Warren, 1900)

Synonyms
- Calyptocome roseoliva Warren, 1900; Calyptocome carnearia Dyar, 1913

= Leptostales roseoliva =

Species of moth

Leptostales kinstonensis is a moth of the family Geometridae. It is found on the Antilles and St. Vincent.

== Subspecies ==
- Leptostales roseoliva roseoliva
- Leptostales roseoliva carnearia Dyar, 1913 (Jamaica)
