= Somatina apicipuncta =

Scientific classification
- Kingdom: Animalia
- Phylum: Arthropoda
- Clade: Pancrustacea
- Class: Insecta
- Order: Lepidoptera
- Family: Geometridae
- Genus: Somatina
- Species: S. apicipuncta

Binomial name
- Somatina apicipuncta Prout, 1915

Species of moth

Somatina apicipuncta is a moth of the family Geometridae. It is found in Ghana.
