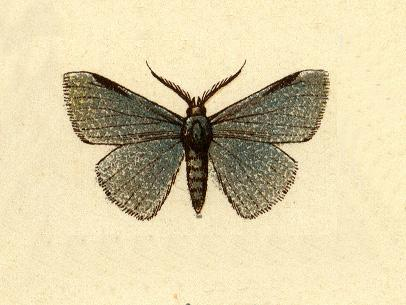

Scientific classification
- Domain: Eukaryota
- Kingdom: Animalia
- Phylum: Arthropoda
- Class: Insecta
- Order: Lepidoptera
- Family: Geometridae
- Genus: Leptostales
- Species: L. virgota

Binomial name
- Leptostales virgota (Schaus, 1901)

Synonyms
- Haemalea virgota Schaus, 1901; Acratodes virgota; Arratodes virgata

= Leptostales virgota =

Species of moth

Leptostales virgota is a moth of the family Geometridae. It is native to the Caribbean, primarily found on Puerto Rico and Jamaica.
