= Somatina mozambica =

Scientific classification
- Kingdom: Animalia
- Phylum: Arthropoda
- Class: Insecta
- Order: Lepidoptera
- Family: Geometridae
- Genus: Somatina
- Species: S. mozambica

Binomial name
- Somatina mozambica (Thierry-Mieg, 1905)

Synonyms
- Problepsis mozambica Thierry-Mieg, 1905

Species of moth

Somatina mozambica is a moth of the family Geometridae. It is found in Mozambique and South Africa.
