= Isoplenodia kisubiensis =

Scientific classification
- Kingdom: Animalia
- Phylum: Arthropoda
- Class: Insecta
- Order: Lepidoptera
- Family: Geometridae
- Genus: Isoplenodia
- Species: I. kisubiensis

Binomial name
- Isoplenodia kisubiensis Sihvonen & Staude, 2010

Species of moth

Isoplenodia kisubiensis is a moth of the family Geometridae. It is found in southern Uganda.
