= Somatina pythiaria =

Scientific classification
- Kingdom: Animalia
- Phylum: Arthropoda
- Class: Insecta
- Order: Lepidoptera
- Family: Geometridae
- Genus: Somatina
- Species: S. pythiaria

Binomial name
- Somatina pythiaria (Guenée, [1858])

Synonyms
- Argyris pythiaria Guenee, 1857

Species of moth

Somatina pythiaria is a moth of the family Geometridae. It is found in Ethiopia and South Africa.
