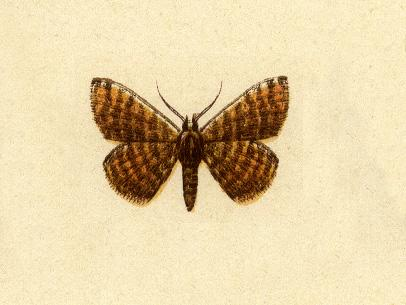

Scientific classification
- Kingdom: Animalia
- Phylum: Arthropoda
- Class: Insecta
- Order: Lepidoptera
- Family: Geometridae
- Genus: Leptostales
- Species: L. phorcaria

Binomial name
- Leptostales phorcaria (Guenee, 1858)

Synonyms
- Acidalia phorcaria Guenee, 1858; Hyria concessata Walker, 1861; Anisodes flavicostaria Moschler, 1886

= Leptostales phorcaria =

Species of moth

Leptostales phorcaria is a moth of the family Geometridae. It is found on Puerto Rico, Hispaniola, Jamaica, the Bahamas and St. Vincent.
