= Somatina probleptica =

Scientific classification
- Kingdom: Animalia
- Phylum: Arthropoda
- Clade: Pancrustacea
- Class: Insecta
- Order: Lepidoptera
- Family: Geometridae
- Genus: Somatina
- Species: S. probleptica

Binomial name
- Somatina probleptica Prout, 1917

Species of moth

Somatina probleptica is a moth of the family Geometridae. It is found in Nigeria.
