= Somatina lemairei =

Scientific classification
- Kingdom: Animalia
- Phylum: Arthropoda
- Class: Insecta
- Order: Lepidoptera
- Family: Geometridae
- Genus: Somatina
- Species: S. lemairei

Binomial name
- Somatina lemairei Herbulot, 1978

Species of moth

Somatina lemairei is a moth of the family Geometridae. It is found in Cameroon.
