= Somatina anthophilata =

Scientific classification
- Kingdom: Animalia
- Phylum: Arthropoda
- Class: Insecta
- Order: Lepidoptera
- Family: Geometridae
- Genus: Somatina
- Species: S. anthophilata

Binomial name
- Somatina anthophilata Guenée, [1858]

Species of moth

Somatina anthophilata is a moth of the family Geometridae. It is found in India.
