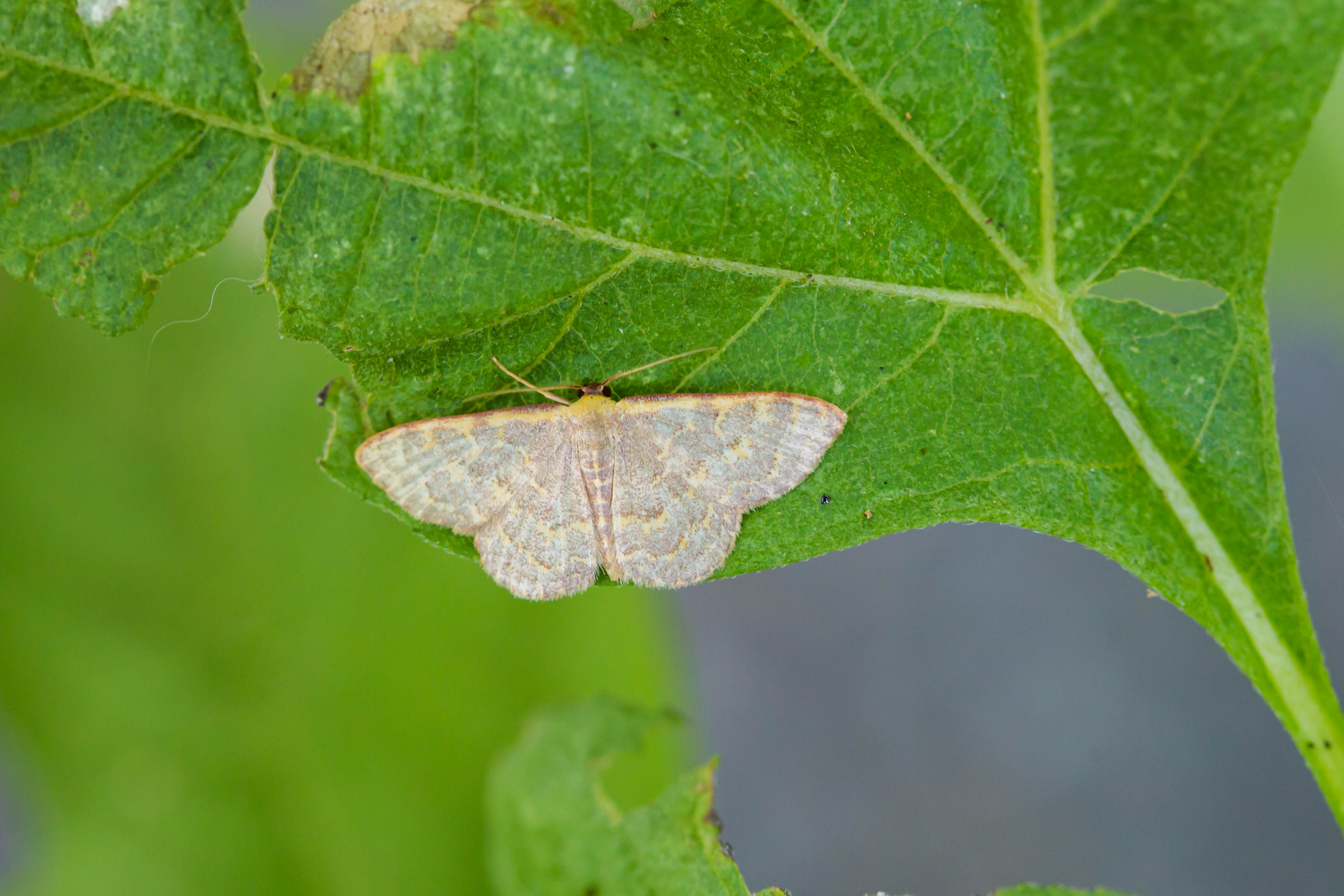

Scientific classification
- Kingdom: Animalia
- Phylum: Arthropoda
- Class: Insecta
- Order: Lepidoptera
- Family: Geometridae
- Genus: Leptostales
- Species: L. pannaria

Binomial name
- Leptostales pannaria (Guenée in Boisduval & Guenée, 1858)

= Leptostales pannaria =

Species of moth

Leptostales pannaria, the pannaria wave moth, is a species of geometrid moth in the family Geometridae.

The MONA or Hodges number for Leptostales pannaria is 7173.
