= Somatina ossicolor =

Scientific classification
- Kingdom: Animalia
- Phylum: Arthropoda
- Class: Insecta
- Order: Lepidoptera
- Family: Geometridae
- Genus: Somatina
- Species: S. ossicolor

Binomial name
- Somatina ossicolor Warren, 1898

Species of moth

Somatina ossicolor is a moth of the family Geometridae. It is found on Sumba.
