= Somatina sedata =

Scientific classification
- Kingdom: Animalia
- Phylum: Arthropoda
- Clade: Pancrustacea
- Class: Insecta
- Order: Lepidoptera
- Family: Geometridae
- Genus: Somatina
- Species: S. sedata

Binomial name
- Somatina sedata Prout, 1922

Species of moth

Somatina sedata is a moth of the family Geometridae. It is found in South Africa and on Madagascar.
