= Leptostales crossii =

Scientific classification
- Domain: Eukaryota
- Kingdom: Animalia
- Phylum: Arthropoda
- Class: Insecta
- Order: Lepidoptera
- Family: Geometridae
- Genus: Leptostales
- Species: L. crossii

Binomial name
- Leptostales crossii (Hulst, 1900)

Species of moth

Leptostales crossii, or Cross's wave moth, is a species of geometrid moth in the family Geometridae.

The MONA or Hodges number for Leptostales crossii is 7174.
