= Somatina fraus =

Scientific classification
- Kingdom: Animalia
- Phylum: Arthropoda
- Clade: Pancrustacea
- Class: Insecta
- Order: Lepidoptera
- Family: Geometridae
- Genus: Somatina
- Species: S. fraus

Binomial name
- Somatina fraus Prout, 1916

Species of moth

Somatina fraus is a moth of the family Geometridae. It is found in the Central African Republic.
