= Zythos fastigata =

Scientific classification
- Kingdom: Animalia
- Phylum: Arthropoda
- Clade: Pancrustacea
- Class: Insecta
- Order: Lepidoptera
- Family: Geometridae
- Genus: Zythos
- Species: Z. fastigata

Binomial name
- Zythos fastigata (L. B. Prout, 1938)

Synonyms
- Nobilia fastigata Prout, 1938

Species of moth

Zythos fastigata is a moth of the family Geometridae first described by Louis Beethoven Prout in 1938. It is found on Sulawesi.
