= Isoplenodia arrogans =

Scientific classification
- Kingdom: Animalia
- Phylum: Arthropoda
- Clade: Pancrustacea
- Class: Insecta
- Order: Lepidoptera
- Family: Geometridae
- Genus: Isoplenodia
- Species: I. arrogans

Binomial name
- Isoplenodia arrogans Prout, 1932

Species of moth

Isoplenodia arrogans is a moth of the family Geometridae. It is found on Madagascar.

The male of this species has a wingspan of 18-19mm, the female of 23mm. Males & females have pectinated antennaes.
