= Zythos aphrodite =

Scientific classification
- Kingdom: Animalia
- Phylum: Arthropoda
- Clade: Pancrustacea
- Class: Insecta
- Order: Lepidoptera
- Family: Geometridae
- Genus: Zythos
- Species: Z. aphrodite

Binomial name
- Zythos aphrodite (Prout, 1932)

Synonyms
- Nobilia aphrodite Prout, 1932; Nobilia rooki Prout, 1938

Species of moth

Zythos aphrodite is a moth of the family Geometridae described by Louis Beethoven Prout in 1932. It is found in New Guinea and Australia.

== Subspecies ==
- Zythos aphrodite aphrodite
- Zythos aphrodite rooki (Prout, 1938) (Rook Island)
