= Somatina hombergi =

Scientific classification
- Kingdom: Animalia
- Phylum: Arthropoda
- Class: Insecta
- Order: Lepidoptera
- Family: Geometridae
- Genus: Somatina
- Species: S. hombergi

Binomial name
- Somatina hombergi Herbulot, 1967

Species of moth

Somatina hombergi is a moth of the family Geometridae. It is found in Gabon.
