= Somatina omicraria =

Scientific classification
- Kingdom: Animalia
- Phylum: Arthropoda
- Class: Insecta
- Order: Lepidoptera
- Family: Geometridae
- Genus: Somatina
- Species: S. omicraria

Binomial name
- Somatina omicraria (Fabricius, 1798)

Synonyms
- Phalaena omicraria Fabricius, 1798; Somatina cana Hampson, 1895; Ephyra extrusata Walker, 1861

Species of moth

Somatina omicraria is a moth of the family Geometridae first described by Johan Christian Fabricius in 1798. It is found in India and Sri Lanka.

== Description ==
Its wingspan is about 30 mm. Antennae of male with fascicles of cilia. It is a white colored moth with fuscous frons. Wings irrorated (sprinkled) with a few fuscous scales. Forewings with traces of a waved antemedial line. A large irregular rufous and fuscous ocellelus at end of cell, with a ring of bluish-silver scales on it. Hindwings with a fulvous and silver line on discocellulars. Both wings with a curved and slightly sinuous postmedial black specks series, with a series of fuscous spots, beyond series of black striae.
