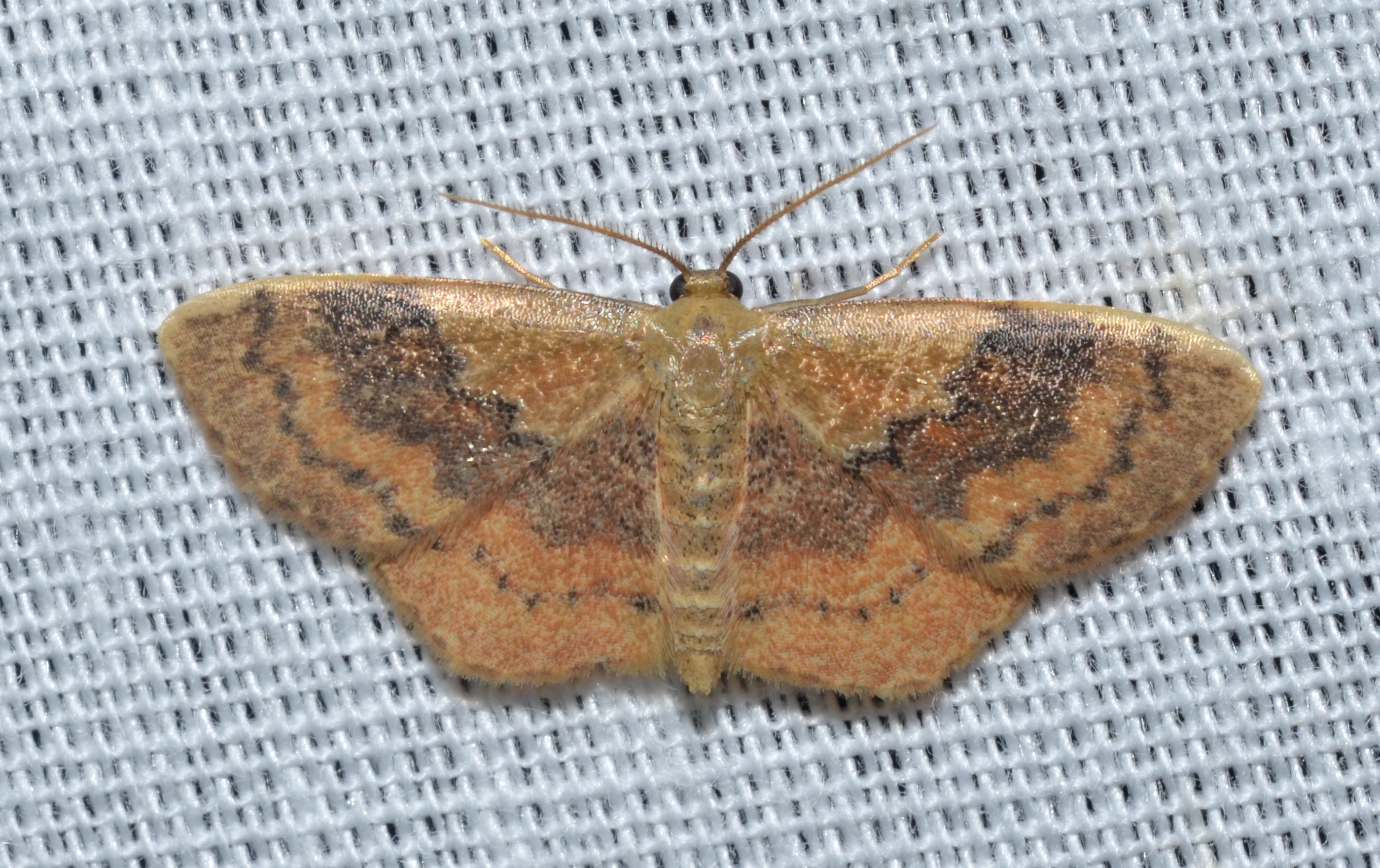

Scientific classification
- Kingdom: Animalia
- Phylum: Arthropoda
- Clade: Pancrustacea
- Class: Insecta
- Order: Lepidoptera
- Family: Geometridae
- Genus: Leptostales
- Species: L. rubromarginaria

Binomial name
- Leptostales rubromarginaria (Packard, 1871)

= Leptostales rubromarginaria =

Species of moth

Leptostales rubromarginaria, the dark-ribboned wave, is a species of geometrid moth in the family Geometridae. It is found in North America.

The MONA or Hodges number for Leptostales rubromarginaria is 7179.

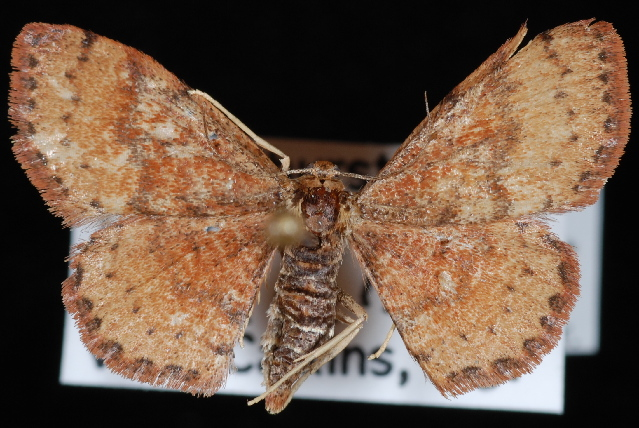
