= Somatina centrofasciaria =

Scientific classification
- Kingdom: Animalia
- Phylum: Arthropoda
- Class: Insecta
- Order: Lepidoptera
- Family: Geometridae
- Genus: Somatina
- Species: S. centrofasciaria

Binomial name
- Somatina centrofasciaria (Leech, 1897)

Synonyms
- Acidalia centrofasciaria Leech, 1897

Species of moth

Somatina centrofasciaria is a moth of the family Geometridae. It is found in central China.
