= Somatina sanctithomae =

Scientific classification
- Kingdom: Animalia
- Phylum: Arthropoda
- Class: Insecta
- Order: Lepidoptera
- Family: Geometridae
- Genus: Somatina
- Species: S. sanctithomae

Binomial name
- Somatina sanctithomae Herbulot, 1958

Species of moth

Somatina sanctithomae is a moth of the family Geometridae. It is found on São Tomé.
