= Somatina obscuriciliata =

Scientific classification
- Kingdom: Animalia
- Phylum: Arthropoda
- Class: Insecta
- Order: Lepidoptera
- Family: Geometridae
- Genus: Somatina
- Species: S. obscuriciliata

Binomial name
- Somatina obscuriciliata Wehrli, 1924

Species of moth

Somatina obscuriciliata is a moth of the family Geometridae. It is found in south-eastern China.
