= Zythos molybdina =

Scientific classification
- Kingdom: Animalia
- Phylum: Arthropoda
- Clade: Pancrustacea
- Class: Insecta
- Order: Lepidoptera
- Family: Geometridae
- Genus: Zythos
- Species: Z. molybdina

Binomial name
- Zythos molybdina (Prout, 1938)

Synonyms
- Nobilia molybdina Prout, 1938; Nobilia tombarensis Prout, 1938

Species of moth

Zythos molybdina is a moth of the family Geometridae described by Louis Beethoven Prout in 1938. It is found in New Guinea.

== Subspecies ==
- Zythos molybdina molybdina
- Zythos molybdina tombarensis (Prout, 1938) (New Britain)
