= Somatina ctenophora =

Scientific classification
- Kingdom: Animalia
- Phylum: Arthropoda
- Clade: Pancrustacea
- Class: Insecta
- Order: Lepidoptera
- Family: Geometridae
- Genus: Somatina
- Species: S. ctenophora

Binomial name
- Somatina ctenophora Prout, 1915

Species of moth

Somatina ctenophora is a moth of the family Geometridae. It is found in Kenya, Namibia and South Africa.
