= Somatina irregularis =

Scientific classification
- Kingdom: Animalia
- Phylum: Arthropoda
- Clade: Pancrustacea
- Class: Insecta
- Order: Lepidoptera
- Family: Geometridae
- Genus: Somatina
- Species: S. irregularis

Binomial name
- Somatina irregularis (Warren, 1898)

Synonyms
- Cosymbia irregularis Warren, 1898

Species of moth

Somatina irregularis is a moth of the family Geometridae. It is found in Nigeria.
