= Zythos modesta =

Scientific classification
- Kingdom: Animalia
- Phylum: Arthropoda
- Class: Insecta
- Order: Lepidoptera
- Family: Geometridae
- Genus: Zythos
- Species: Z. modesta

Binomial name
- Zythos modesta Yazaki, 1996

Species of moth

Zythos modesta is a moth of the family Geometridaefirst described by Katsumi Yazaki in 1996. It is found on the island of Bohol in the Philippines.

The wingspan is about 32 mm.
