= Zythos clypeata =

Scientific classification
- Kingdom: Animalia
- Phylum: Arthropoda
- Class: Insecta
- Order: Lepidoptera
- Family: Geometridae
- Genus: Zythos
- Species: Z. clypeata

Binomial name
- Zythos clypeata Yazaki, 1996

Species of moth

Zythos clypeata is a moth of the family Geometridae first described by Katsumi Yazaki in 1996. It is found on the island of Leyte in the Philippines.

The wingspan is 33–34 mm.
