= Somatina discata =

Scientific classification
- Kingdom: Animalia
- Phylum: Arthropoda
- Class: Insecta
- Order: Lepidoptera
- Family: Geometridae
- Genus: Somatina
- Species: S. discata

Binomial name
- Somatina discata Warren, 1909

Species of moth

Somatina discata is a moth of the family Geometridae. It is found in China (Hainan).
