= Somatina rufifascia =

Scientific classification
- Kingdom: Animalia
- Phylum: Arthropoda
- Class: Insecta
- Order: Lepidoptera
- Family: Geometridae
- Genus: Somatina
- Species: S. rufifascia

Binomial name
- Somatina rufifascia Warren, 1896

Synonyms
- Somatina rufifascia ab. maculata Warren, 1898; Somatina rufifascia ab. rubridisca Swhinhoe, 1900; Somatina rufifascia ab. sordida Warren, 1898

Species of moth

Somatina rufifascia is a moth of the family Geometridae first described by William Warren in 1896. It is found in Queensland, Australia.
