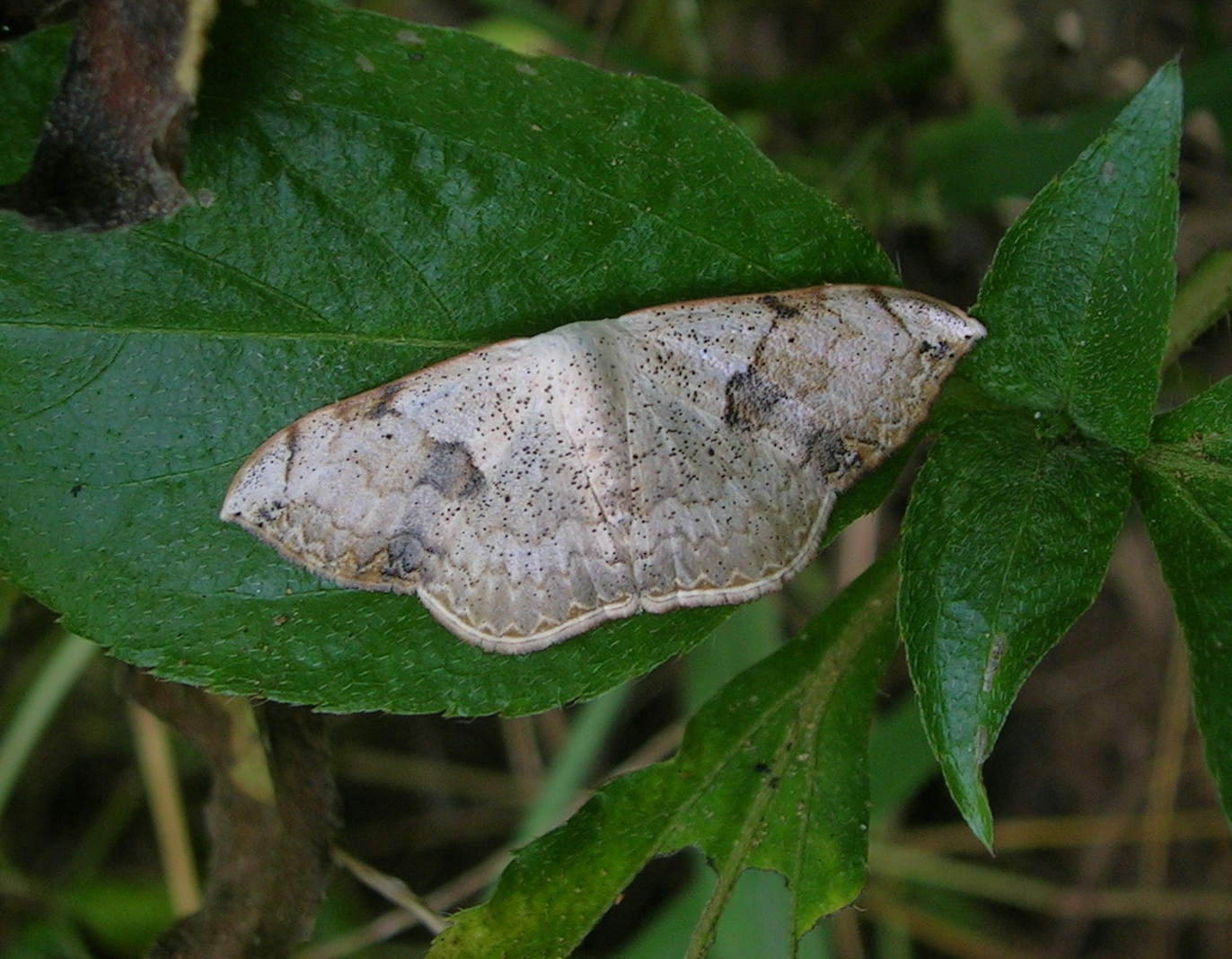

Scientific classification
- Kingdom: Animalia
- Phylum: Arthropoda
- Class: Insecta
- Order: Lepidoptera
- Family: Geometridae
- Genus: Somatina
- Species: S. plynusaria

Binomial name
- Somatina plynusaria (Walker, [1863])

Synonyms
- Anisodes plynusaria Walker, 1863; Anisodes congruaria Walker, 1869

= Somatina plynusaria =

Species of moth

Somatina plynusaria is a moth of the family Geometridae. It is found in northern India, China and Taiwan.
