= Zythos cupreata =

Scientific classification
- Kingdom: Animalia
- Phylum: Arthropoda
- Class: Insecta
- Order: Lepidoptera
- Family: Geometridae
- Genus: Zythos
- Species: Z. cupreata

Binomial name
- Zythos cupreata (Pagenstecher, 1888)

Synonyms
- Plutodes cupreata Pagenstecher, 1888; Nobilia nebulosa Warren, 1897

Species of moth

Zythos cupreata is a moth of the family Geometridae first described by Arnold Pagenstecher in 1888. It is found on the Maluku Islands in Indonesia.
