= Isoplenodia vidalensis =

Scientific classification
- Kingdom: Animalia
- Phylum: Arthropoda
- Class: Insecta
- Order: Lepidoptera
- Family: Geometridae
- Genus: Isoplenodia
- Species: I. vidalensis

Binomial name
- Isoplenodia vidalensis Sihvonen & Staude, 2010

Species of moth

Isoplenodia vidalensis is a moth of the family Geometridae. It is found in eastern South Africa.
