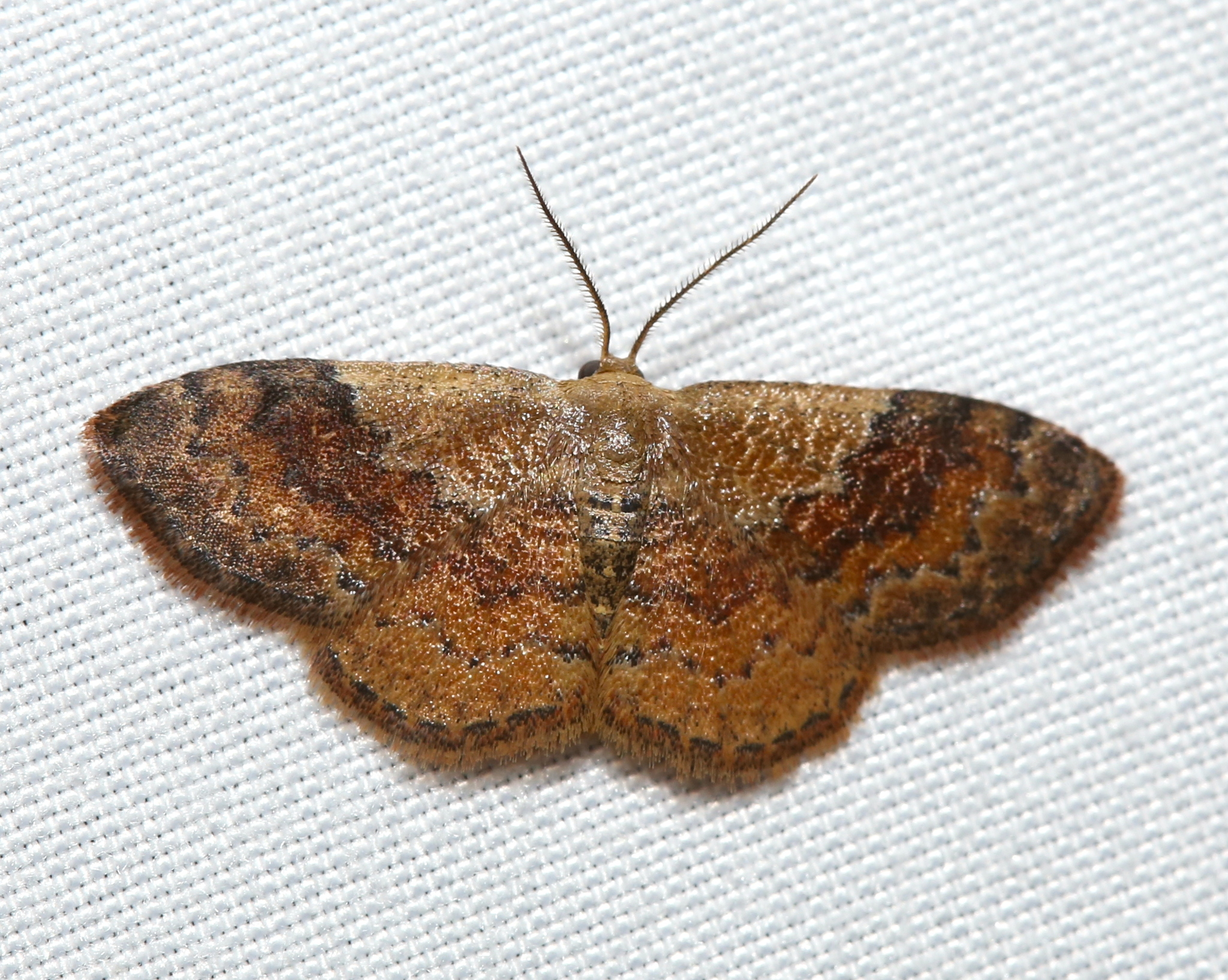

Scientific classification
- Kingdom: Animalia
- Phylum: Arthropoda
- Clade: Pancrustacea
- Class: Insecta
- Order: Lepidoptera
- Family: Geometridae
- Genus: Leptostales
- Species: L. ferruminaria

Binomial name
- Leptostales ferruminaria (Zeller, 1872)

Synonyms
- Acidalia ferruminaria Zeller, 1872

= Leptostales ferruminaria =

Light-ribboned wave

Species of moth

Leptostales ferruminaria, the light-ribboned wave, is a moth of the family Geometridae. The species was first described by Philipp Christoph Zeller in 1872. It is found in North America, where it has been recorded from eastern North America west to Oklahoma and north to British Columbia. The habitat consists of dry shrubby areas and wooded edges along the floodplains of prairie rivers.

The wingspan is 15–20 mm. Adults are variable. Adults are on wing from late May to mid-June in one generation per year.
