= Somatina virginalis =

Scientific classification
- Kingdom: Animalia
- Phylum: Arthropoda
- Clade: Pancrustacea
- Class: Insecta
- Order: Lepidoptera
- Family: Geometridae
- Genus: Somatina
- Species: S. virginalis

Binomial name
- Somatina virginalis Prout, 1917

Species of moth

Somatina virginalis is a moth of the family Geometridae. It is found in Angola, the Democratic Republic of Congo, Kenya, Malawi, Sierra Leone, South Africa, Tanzania, Uganda and Zimbabwe.
