= Somatina rhodochila =

Scientific classification
- Kingdom: Animalia
- Phylum: Arthropoda
- Clade: Pancrustacea
- Class: Insecta
- Order: Lepidoptera
- Family: Geometridae
- Genus: Somatina
- Species: S. rhodochila

Binomial name
- Somatina rhodochila Prout, 1932

Species of moth

Somatina rhodochila is a moth of the family Geometridae. It is found in the Democratic Republic of Congo.
