= Isoplenodia =

Scientific classification
- Kingdom: Animalia
- Phylum: Arthropoda
- Clade: Pancrustacea
- Class: Insecta
- Order: Lepidoptera
- Family: Geometridae
- Tribe: Scopulini
- Genus: Isoplenodia; Prout, 1932

Genus of moths

Isoplenodia is a genus of moths in the family Geometridae. It formerly consisted of only one species, Isoplenodia arrogans, found on Madagascar, but new species were described in 2010.

== Species ==
- Isoplenodia arabukoensis Sihvonen & Staude, 2010
- Isoplenodia arrogans Prout, 1932
- Isoplenodia kisubiensis Sihvonen & Staude, 2010
- Isoplenodia vidalensis Sihvonen & Staude, 2010
