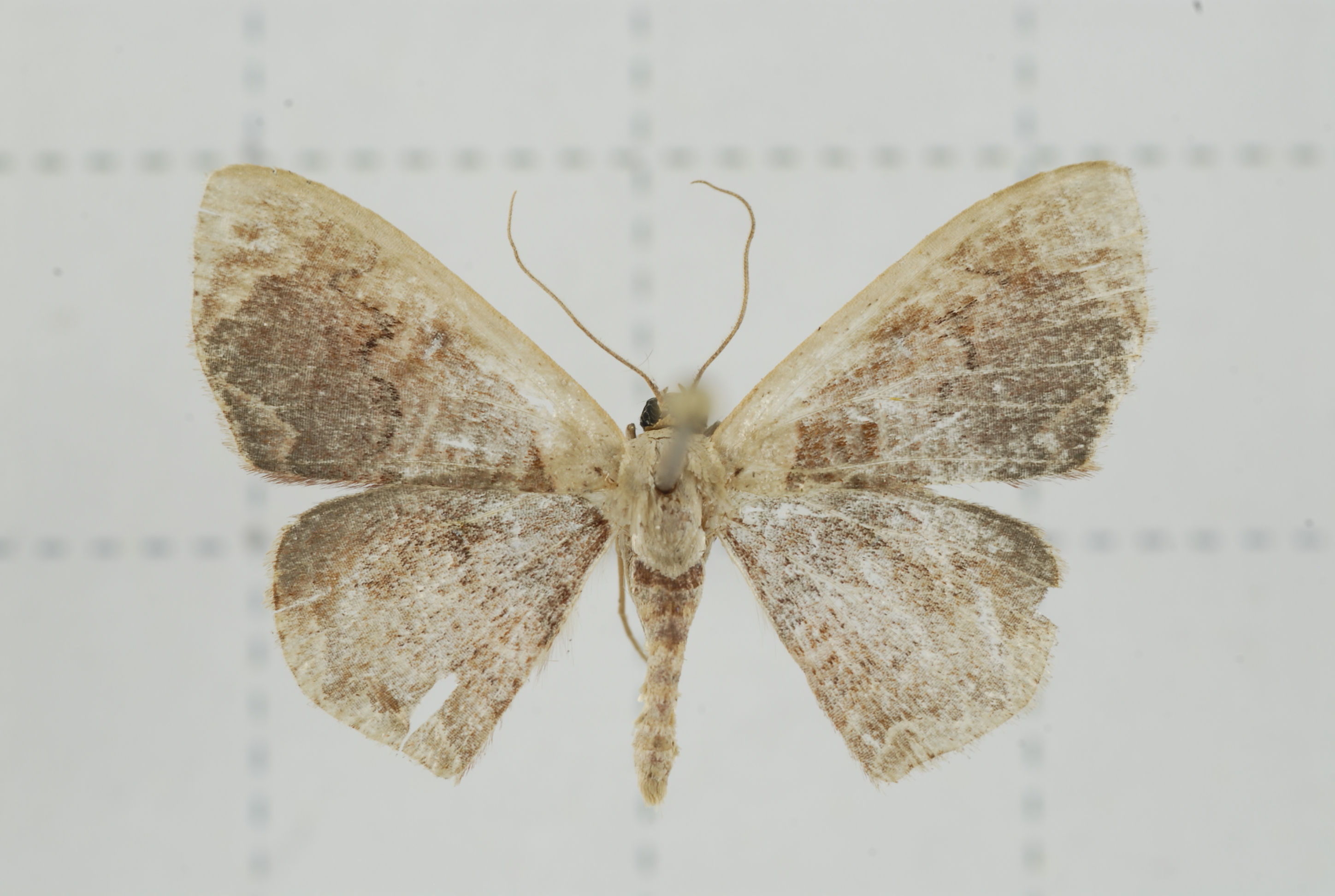

Scientific classification
- Kingdom: Animalia
- Phylum: Arthropoda
- Class: Insecta
- Order: Lepidoptera
- Family: Geometridae
- Tribe: Scopulini
- Genus: Lipomelia; Warren, 1893
- Species: L. subusta

Binomial name
- Lipomelia subusta Warren, 1893

Synonyms
- Genus: Defoa Swinhoe, 1893; Species: Defoa ustata Swinhoe, 1893

= Lipomelia =

Genus of moths

Lipomelia is a monotypic moth genus in the family Geometridae. It contains only one species, Lipomelia subusta, which is found in India and Taiwan. Both the genus and species were first described by William Warren in 1893.
