= Somatina lia =

Scientific classification
- Kingdom: Animalia
- Phylum: Arthropoda
- Clade: Pancrustacea
- Class: Insecta
- Order: Lepidoptera
- Family: Geometridae
- Genus: Somatina
- Species: S. lia

Binomial name
- Somatina lia Prout, 1915

Species of moth

Somatina lia is a moth of the family Geometridae. It is found on the Comoros, La Réunion and Madagascar.
