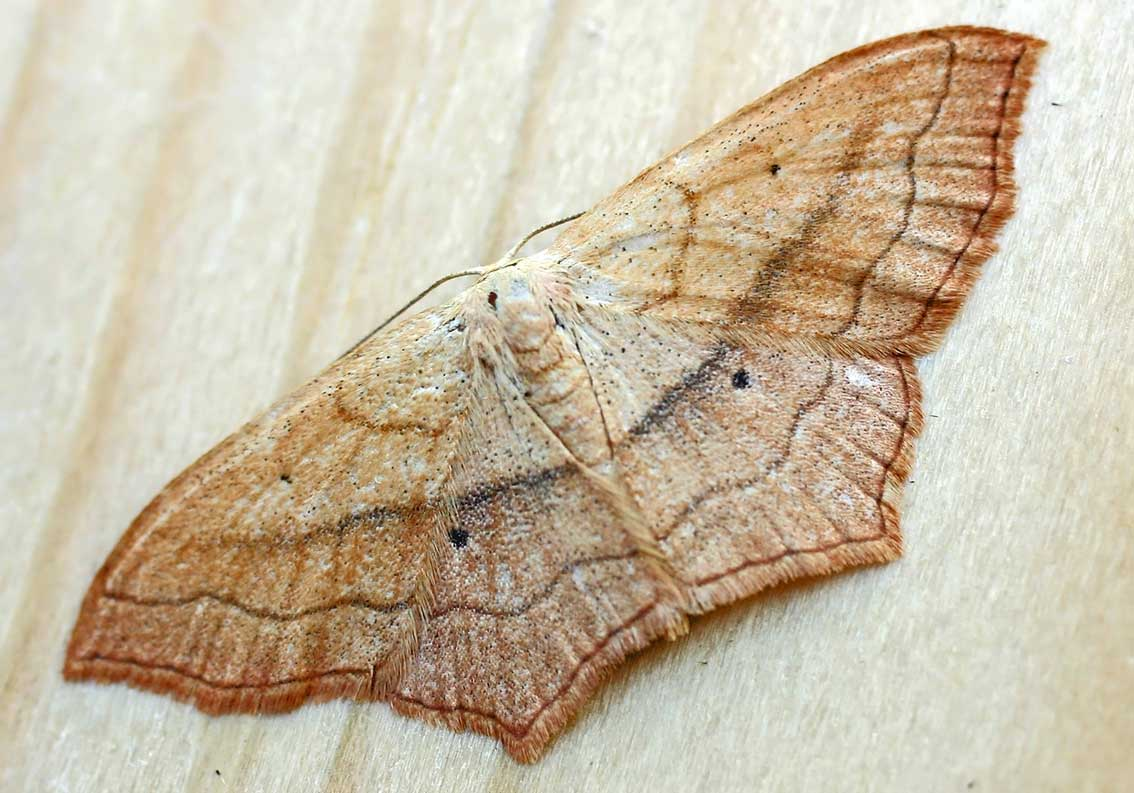
- Scopula imitaria

Scientific classification
- Kingdom: Animalia
- Phylum: Arthropoda
- Clade: Pancrustacea
- Class: Insecta
- Order: Lepidoptera
- Family: Geometridae
- Subfamily: Sterrhinae
- Tribe: Scopulini; Duponchel, 1845

Synonyms
- Aletinae Hampson, 1918; Aletini; Problepsini Wiltshire, 1990

= Scopulini =

Tribe of moths

Scopulini is a tribe of the geometer moth family (Geometridae), with about 900 species in seven genera. The tribe was described by Philogène Auguste Joseph Duponchel in 1845.

== Systematics ==
Scopulini as a family name is an old synonym of the subfamily Sterrhinae (Meyrick, 1892). The tribe Scopulini is divided into seven genera, of which only Scopula and Problepsis have species in Europe.

- Scopulini Duponchel, 1845
  - Dithalama Meyrick, 1888 (4 species in Australia and Tasmania)
  - Isoplenodia Prout, 1932 (4 species in Africa)
  - Lipomelia Warren, 1893 (1 species from India to Taiwan)
  - Somatina Guenée, 1858 (44 species in Africa, East Asia and Australia)
  - Zythos D. S. Fletcher, 1979 (11 species from Indonesia up to Papua-New Guinea)
  - Problepsis Lederer, 1853 (51 species in the Palearctic, Africa, South-East Asia to Australia)
  - Scopula Schrank, 1802 (including Glossotrophia Prout, 1913 and Holarctias Prout, 1913) (over 800 species)

== Phylogenetics ==
The phylogenetics of Scopulini was described in detail in 2005 by Pasi Sihvonen.

- Sterrhinae
  - Outgroup (Idaea)
  - Scopulini
    - - - - incertae sedis
          - - Isoplenodia
            - Dithalama
        - - Zythos
          - Somatina
      - - - Lipomelia
          - Problepsis
        - incertae sedis
        - Scopula

=== Literature ===
- Hausmann, Axel The Geometrid Moths of Europe, 2. Sterrhinae. Apollo Books, Stenstrup 2004, ISBN 87-88757-37-4
- Abraham, D.; Ryrholm, N.; Wittzell, H.; Holloway, J. D.; Scoble, M. J.; Lofstedt, C.: "Molecular phylogeny of the subfamilies in Geometridae (Geometroidea: Lepidoptera)". Molecular Phylogenetics and Evolution. 20(1): 65-77 (2001)
- Sihvonen, Pasi (April 1, 2005). "Phylogeny and classification of the Scopulini moths (Lepidoptera: Geometridae, Sterrhinae)". Zoological Journal of the Linnean Society. 143 (4): 473–530. doi:10.1111/j.1096-3642.2005.00153.x.
