= A. gigantea =

A. gigantea may refer to:

- Aechmea gigantea, a plant species endemic to Venezuela
- Agathia gigantea, a moth species found in Java, Sumatra, Peninsular Malaysia and Borneo
- Agrostis gigantea, the redtop, a perennial grass native to Europe
- Aldabrachelys gigantea, a giant tortoise species of the Seychelles.
- Aristolochia gigantea, the Brazilian Dutchman's pipe or giant pelican flower, an ornamental plant species
- Arundinaria gigantea, a North American bamboo
