= Tabernaemontana parviflora =

Tabernaemontana parviflora is a taxonomic synonym that may refer to:

- Tabernaemontana parviflora Decne. = Tabernaemontana pandacaqui
- Tabernaemontana parviflora Bojer = Tabernaemontana persicariifolia
- Tabernaemontana parviflora Roxb. = Tabernaemontana rostrata
- Tabernaemontana parviflora Poir. = Ichnocarpus frutescens
