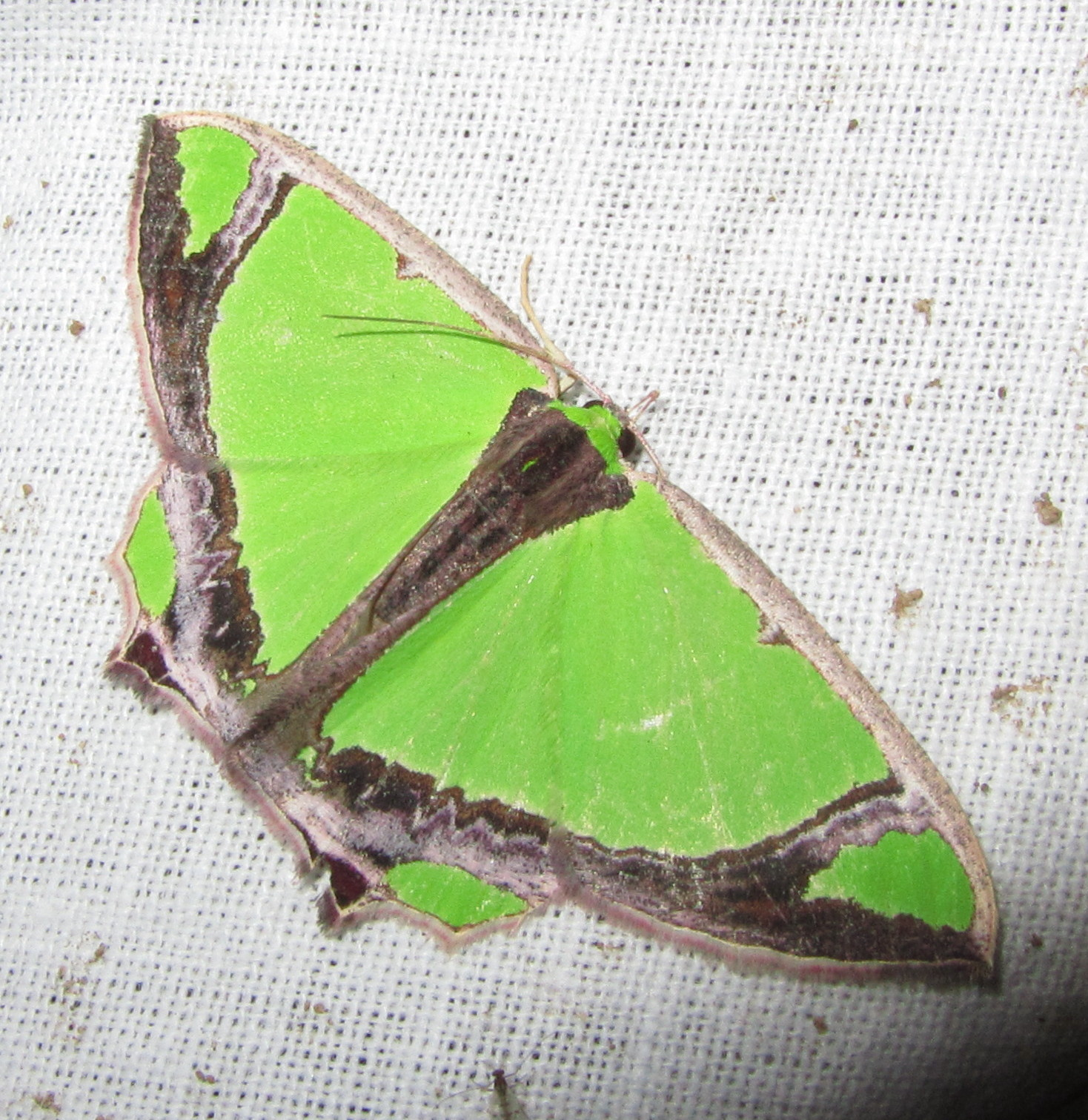

Scientific classification
- Kingdom: Animalia
- Phylum: Arthropoda
- Class: Insecta
- Order: Lepidoptera
- Family: Geometridae
- Genus: Agathia
- Species: A. laetata

Binomial name
- Agathia laetata (Fabricius, 1794)

Synonyms
- Phalaena laetata Fabricius, 1794; Agathia catenaria Walker, 1861; Agathia laetata isogyna Prout, 1916; Agathia furcula Matsumura, 1931; Agathia laetata andamanensis Prout, 1932

= Agathia laetata =

Species of moth

Agathia laetata is a species of moth of the family Geometridae which was first described by Johan Christian Fabricius in 1794. It is found in India, Indochina, southern China, Taiwan and Sundaland.

== Description ==
Its wingspan is about 38 mm. This species differs from other Agathia species by having outer rufous area of inner edge evenly curved on forewing and dentate on hindwings. The green patch below apex of each wing is oval. The green spots towards inner margin of the hindwings are rarely developed. The ocellus is more developed.

Larvae are green, with forsal prominences on first and eleventh somites. Pupa are yellowish green above, green below, the abdominal somites black speckled. The larvae feed on Ichnocarpus, Nerium and Marsdenia species. Eggs are shining light green, oval, flat topped or concave.
