= Agathia magnifica =

Scientific classification
- Domain: Eukaryota
- Kingdom: Animalia
- Phylum: Arthropoda
- Class: Insecta
- Order: Lepidoptera
- Family: Geometridae
- Genus: Agathia
- Species: A. magnifica

Binomial name
- Agathia magnifica Moore, 1879

Species of moth

Agathia magnifica is a moth of the family Geometridae.
