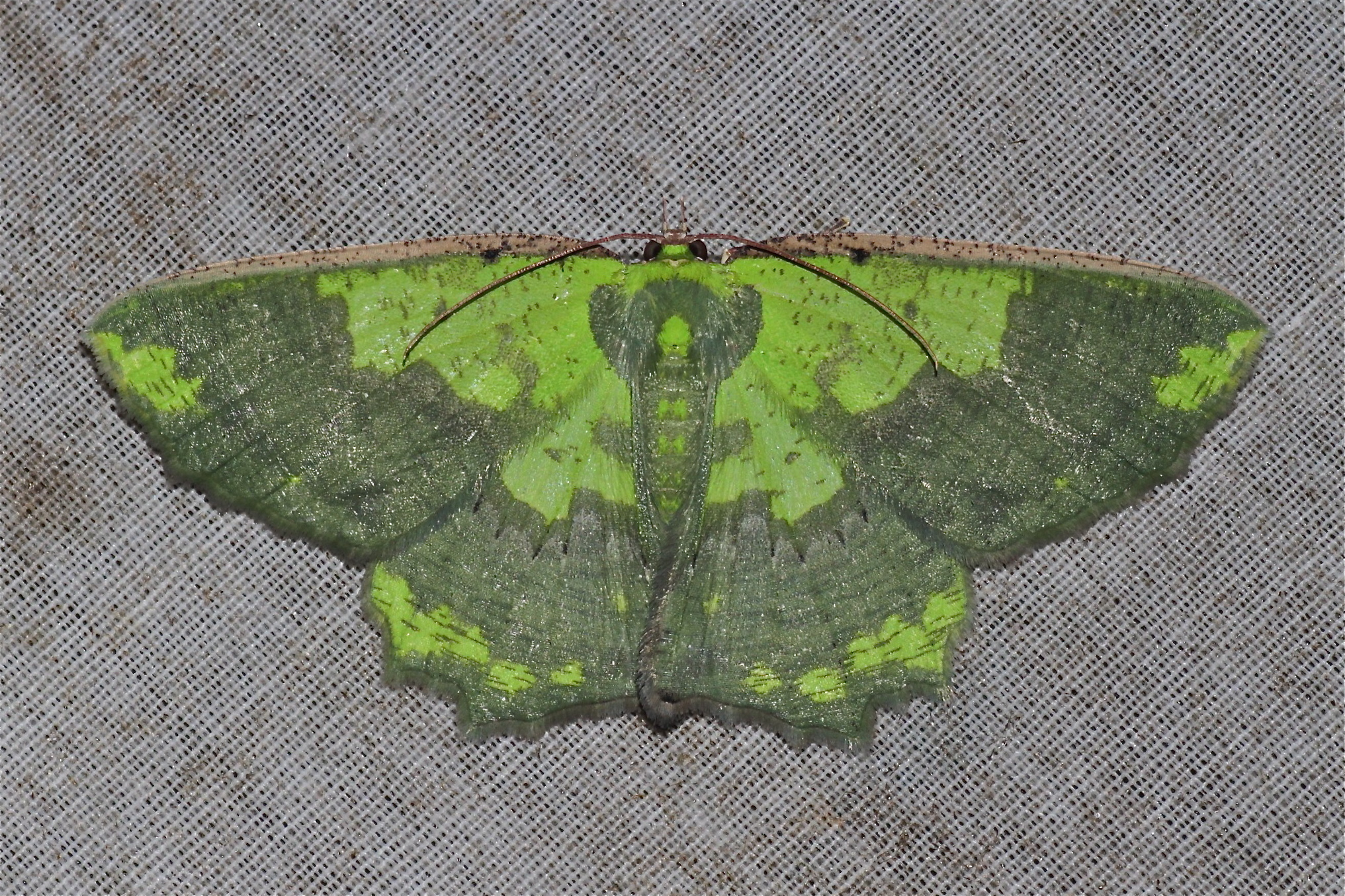
- From Borneo

Scientific classification
- Domain: Eukaryota
- Kingdom: Animalia
- Phylum: Arthropoda
- Class: Insecta
- Order: Lepidoptera
- Family: Geometridae
- Genus: Agathia
- Species: A. obsoleta

Binomial name
- Agathia obsoleta Warren, 1897

Synonyms
- Agathia olivacea Warren, 1905

= Agathia obsoleta =

Species of moth

Agathia obsoleta is a species of moth in the family Geometridae first described by William Warren in 1897. It is found in Java, Sumatra, Borneo and the Philippines. A. obsoleta is a rare species of lowland forests, including heath forest.

== Subspecies ==
- Agathia obsoleta obsoleta
- Agathia obsoleta olivacea Warren, 1905 = Agathia olivacea Warren, 1905
