= Agathia solaria =

Scientific classification
- Domain: Eukaryota
- Kingdom: Animalia
- Phylum: Arthropoda
- Class: Insecta
- Order: Lepidoptera
- Family: Geometridae
- Genus: Agathia
- Species: A. solaria

Binomial name
- Agathia solaria C. Swinhoe, 1905

Synonyms
- Agathia discisticta Prout, 1912

Species of moth

Agathia solaria is a species of moth of the family Geometridae first described by Charles Swinhoe in 1905. It is found in the Himalayas, Singapore and possibly Sulawesi.
