= Agathia affluens =

Scientific classification
- Kingdom: Animalia
- Phylum: Arthropoda
- Clade: Pancrustacea
- Class: Insecta
- Order: Lepidoptera
- Family: Geometridae
- Genus: Agathia
- Species: A. affluens

Binomial name
- Agathia affluens Prout, 1937

Species of moth

Agathia affluens is a species of moth of the family Geometridae. It is found in Bali.

It was first described by Louis Beethoven Prout in 1937.
