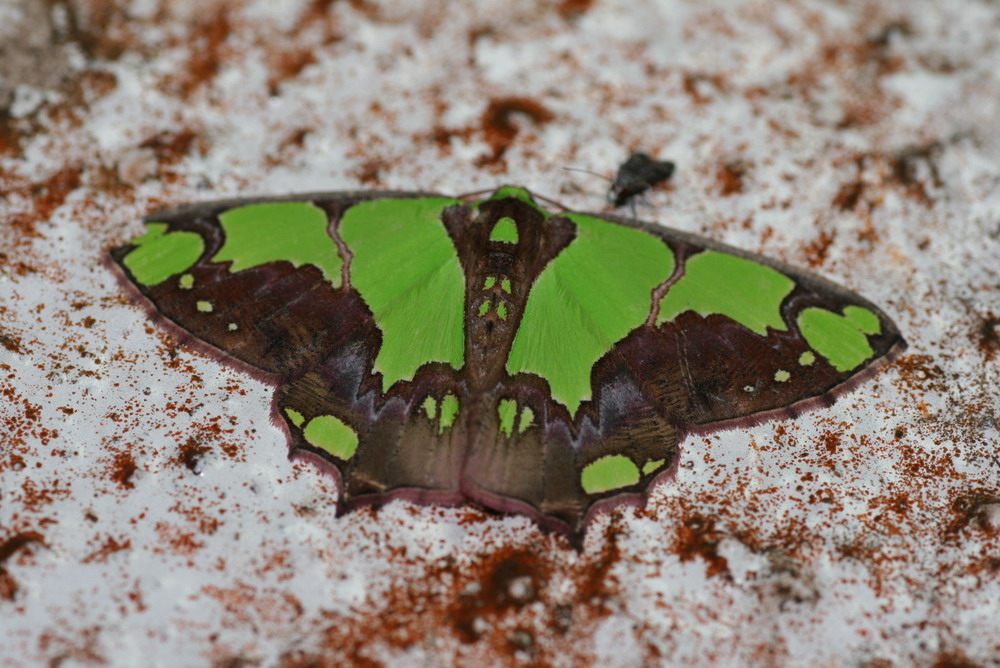

Scientific classification
- Kingdom: Animalia
- Phylum: Arthropoda
- Class: Insecta
- Order: Lepidoptera
- Family: Geometridae
- Genus: Agathia
- Species: A. arcuata

Binomial name
- Agathia arcuata Moore, [1868]

= Agathia arcuata =

Species of moth

Agathia arcuata is a species of moth of the family Geometridae first described by Frederic Moore in 1868. It is found in India, Burma, Hainan, Peninsular Malaysia, Borneo, Sumatra and Java.
