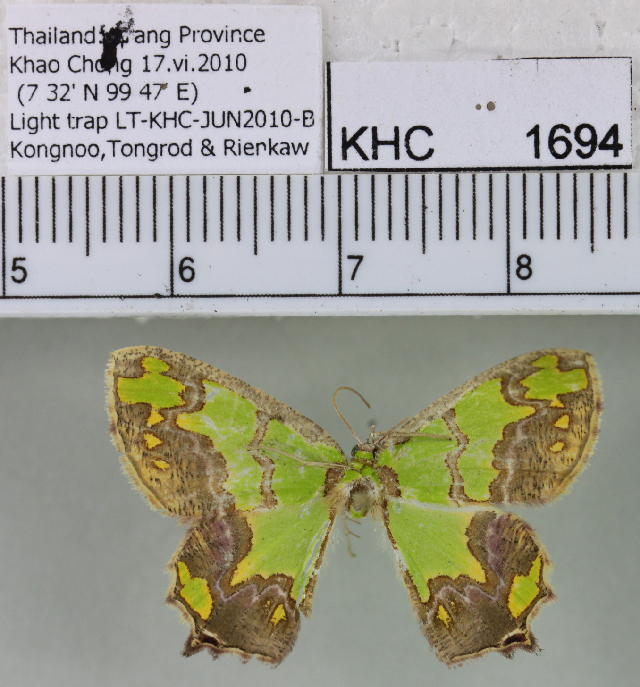

Scientific classification
- Kingdom: Animalia
- Phylum: Arthropoda
- Class: Insecta
- Order: Lepidoptera
- Family: Geometridae
- Genus: Agathia
- Species: A. hemithearia

Binomial name
- Agathia hemithearia Guenée, 1857

= Agathia hemithearia =

Species of moth

Agathia hemithearia is a species of moth in the family Geometridae. It was first described by Achille Guenée in 1857. It is found in India, Sri Lanka, China (Hainan), Taiwan and Thailand.

== Description ==
Its wingspan is about 36 mm. The markings are rufous. The thorax and abdomen are more heavily marked. Forewings with a medial band of regular width, and angled on median nervure. Both wings with rufous outer area irrorated (sprinkled) with fuscous, with a waved postmedial grey line enclosing some conjoined sub-marginal green patches below the apex of each wing and near the inner margin of the hindwings. There is a green area sending a prominent tooth in to the rufous area at vein 5 and below vein 2 of each wing. The ocellus is reduced to a pale line across the tail. Ventral side with purplish fuscous markings.
