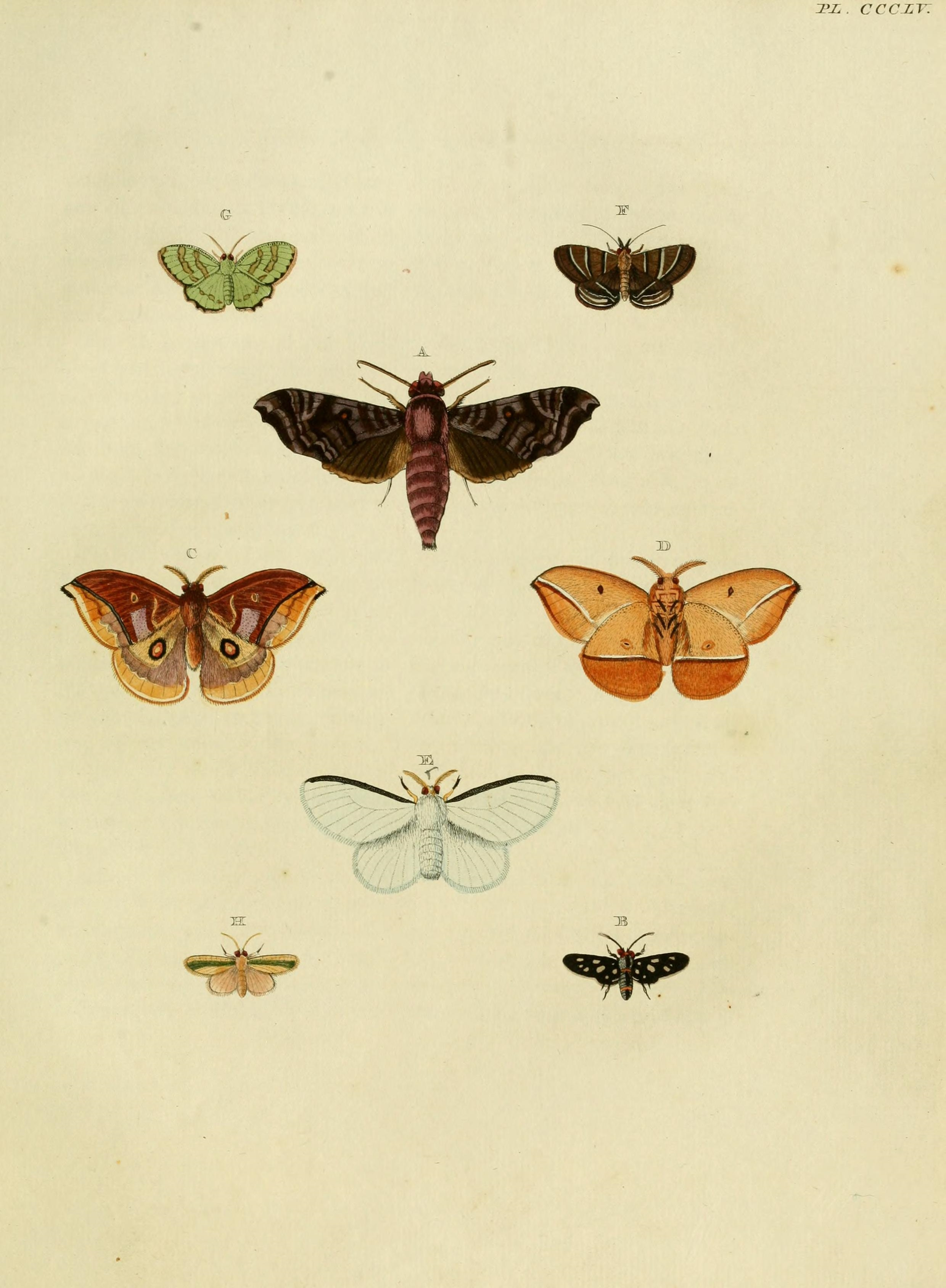
- Upper left corner

Scientific classification
- Kingdom: Animalia
- Phylum: Arthropoda
- Clade: Pancrustacea
- Class: Insecta
- Order: Lepidoptera
- Family: Geometridae
- Genus: Agathia
- Species: A. conviridaria

Binomial name
- Agathia conviridaria Hübner, 1823

= Agathia conviridaria =

Species of moth

Agathia conviridaria is a moth of the family Geometridae first described by Jacob Hübner in 1823. It is found in India and Sri Lanka.
