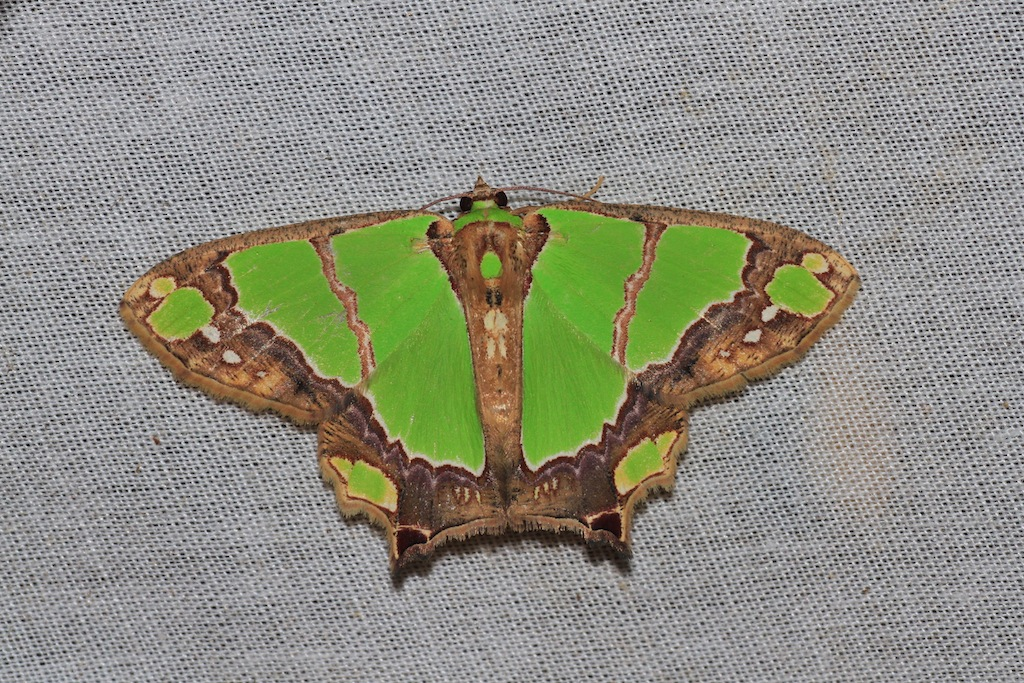

Scientific classification
- Domain: Eukaryota
- Kingdom: Animalia
- Phylum: Arthropoda
- Class: Insecta
- Order: Lepidoptera
- Family: Geometridae
- Genus: Agathia
- Species: A. rubrilineata

Binomial name
- Agathia rubrilineata Warren, 1896

Synonyms
- Agathia ithearia Swinhoe, 1905; Agathia aequisecta Swinhoe, 1906; Agathia klossi Prout, 1931

= Agathia rubrilineata =

Species of moth

Agathia rubrilineata is a species of moth of the family Geometridae first described by William Warren in 1896. It is found in Borneo, Sumatra; Siberut (ssp. klossi); Java (ssp. aequisecta).
