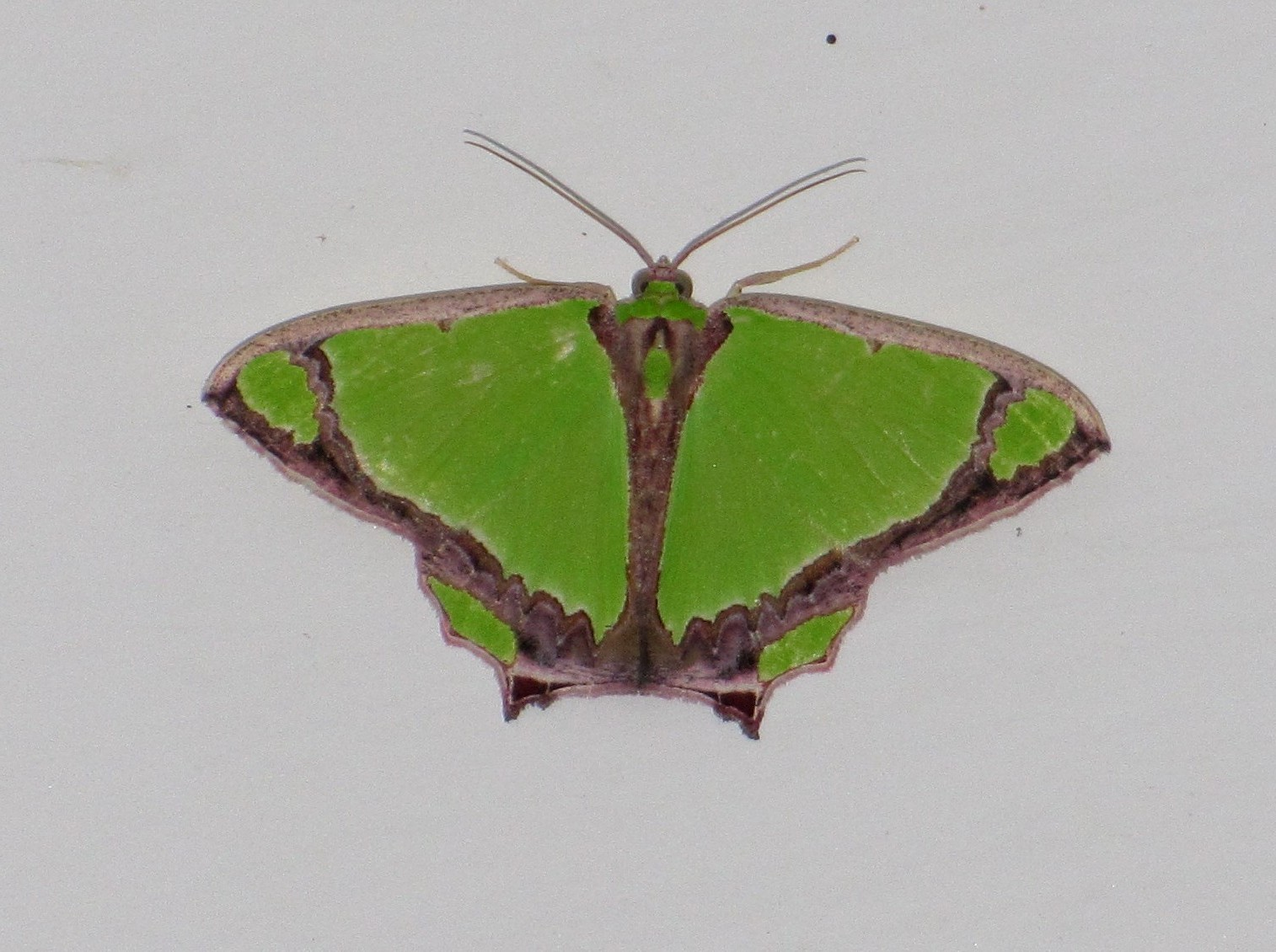
- Agathia laetata

Scientific classification
- Kingdom: Animalia
- Phylum: Arthropoda
- Class: Insecta
- Order: Lepidoptera
- Family: Geometridae
- Subfamily: Geometrinae
- Genus: Agathia; Guenée, [1858]

Synonyms
- Hypagathia Inoue, 1961; Lophochlora Warren, 1894

= Agathia =

Genus of geometer moths

Agathia is a genus of moths in the family Geometridae described by Achille Guenée in 1858.

== Description ==
Palpi with second joint upturned and reaching vertex of head, and third joint porrect (extending forward), which is short in male and long in female. Antennae almost simple. Hind tibia of male dilated with a fold containing a tuft of long hair and ending in a short process on upperside. Abdomen with dorsal tufts. Forewings with vein 3 from angle of cell. Veins 7, 8, 9 and 10 stalked and vein 11 free. Hindwings with vein 3 from angle of cell. Veins 6 and 7 from upper angle and vein 8 approximating to vein 7 to near middle of cell. The outer margin produced to a point at vein 4.

== Species ==
- Agathia affluens Prout, 1937
- Agathia arcuata Moore, [1868]
- Agathia carissima Butler, 1878
- Agathia codina Swinhoe, 1892
- Agathia conviridaria Hübner, 1823
- Agathia cristifera (Walker, 1861)
- Agathia deliciosa Holloway & Sommerer, 1984
- Agathia diplochorda Prout, 1916
- Agathia distributa Lucas, 1891
- Agathia diversiformis Warren, 1894
- Agathia eromenoides Holloway, 1996
- Agathia gigantea Butler, 1880
- Agathia hemithearia Guenee, 1857
- Agathia kuehni Warren, 1898
- Agathia laetata (Fabricius, 1794)
- Agathia laqueifera Prout, 1912
- Agathia largita Holloway, 1996
- Agathia lycaenaria (Kollar, 1848)
- Agathia magnifica Moore, 1879
- Agathia magnificentia Inoue, 1978
- Agathia muluensis Holloway, 1996
- Agathia obsoleta Warren, 1897
- Agathia ochrotypa Turner, 1922
- Agathia pisina Butler, 1887
- Agathia prasinaspis Meyrick, 1889
- Agathia quinaria Moore, [1868]
- Agathia rubrilineata Warren, 1896
- Agathia solaria Swinhoe, 1905
- Agathia succedanea Warren, 1897
- Agathia vicina (Bastelberger, 1911)
- Agathia visenda Prout, 1917
