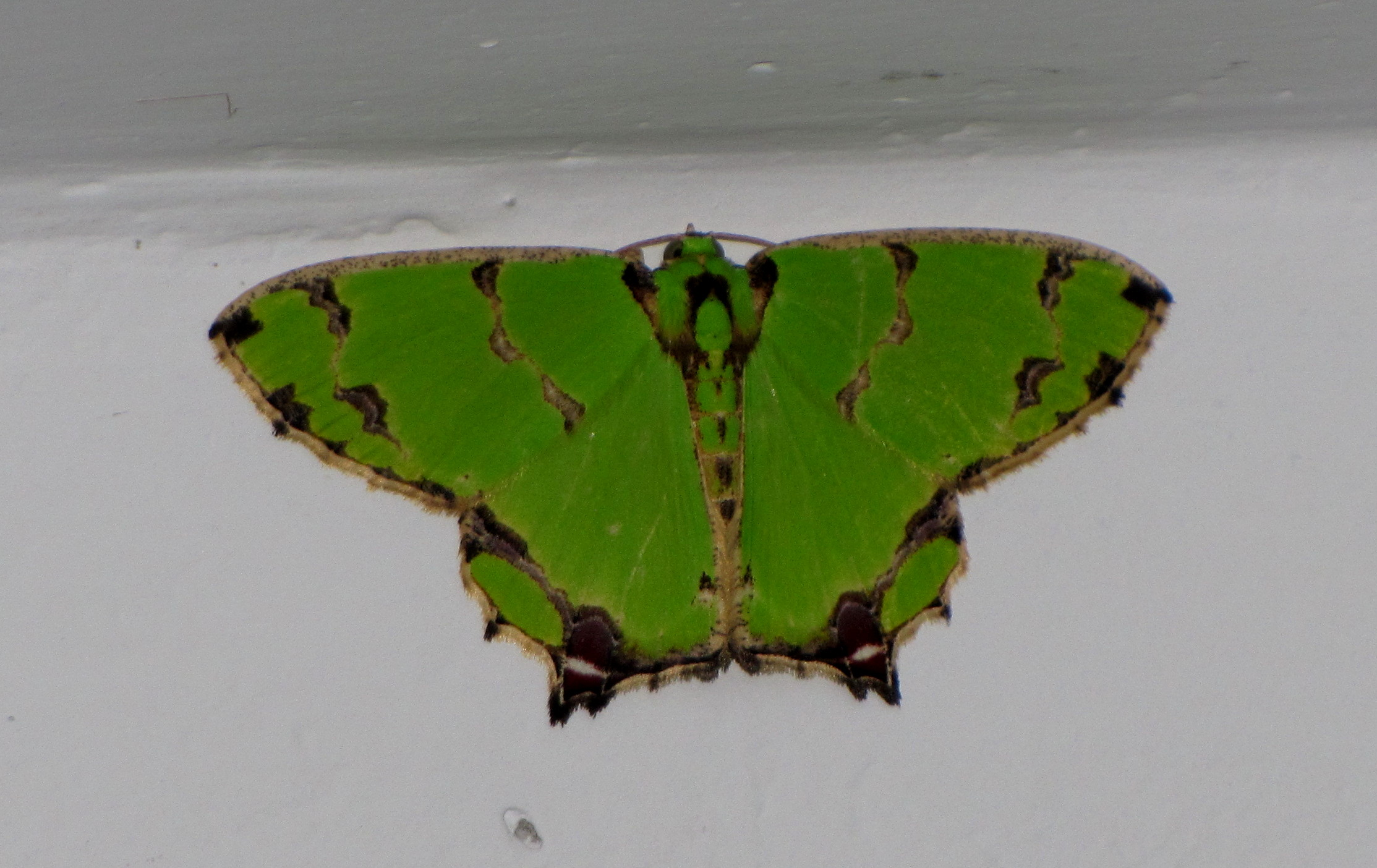
- Male

Scientific classification
- Kingdom: Animalia
- Phylum: Arthropoda
- Clade: Pancrustacea
- Class: Insecta
- Order: Lepidoptera
- Family: Geometridae
- Genus: Agathia
- Species: A. lycaenaria

Binomial name
- Agathia lycaenaria (Kollar, 1848)

Synonyms
- Geometra lycaenaria Kollar, 1848; Geometra albiangularia Herrich-Schäffer, [1855]; Agathia discriminata Walker, 1861; Agathia impar Prout, 1916; Agathia luzonensis Prout, 1916; Agathia par Prout, 1916; Agathia hedia Prout, 1916

= Agathia lycaenaria =

Species of moth

Agathia lycaenaria is a species of moth of the family Geometridae first described by Vincenz Kollar in 1848. It is found from Pakistan to Australia.

== Subspecies ==
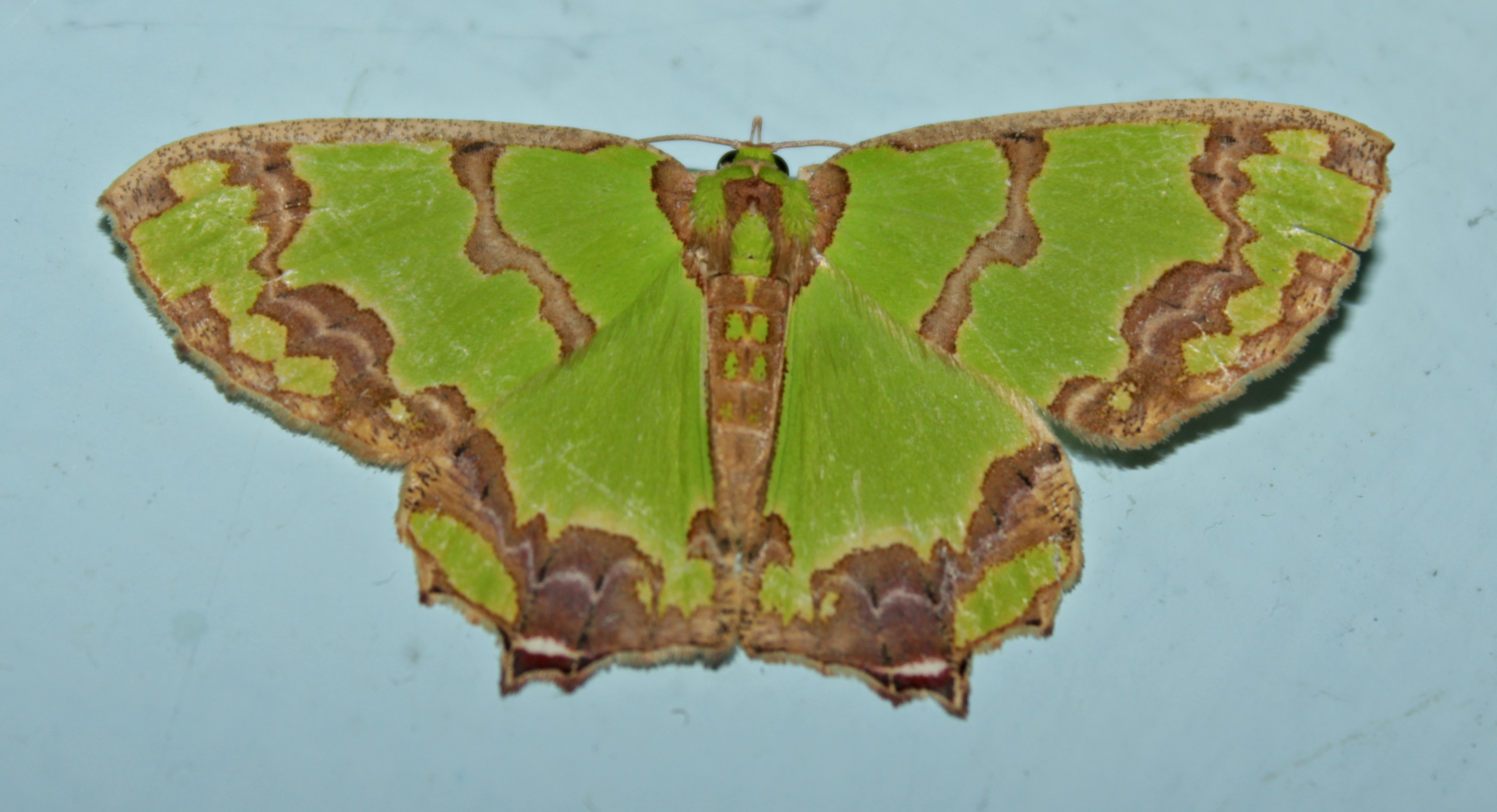
In Kerala, India

- Agathia lycaenaria lycaenaria
- Agathia lycaenaria chizumon Inoue, 1956
- Agathia lycaenaria reducta Inoue, 1961
- Agathia lycaenaria samuelsoni Inoue, 1964
- Agathia lycaenaria subreducta Inoue, 1982
