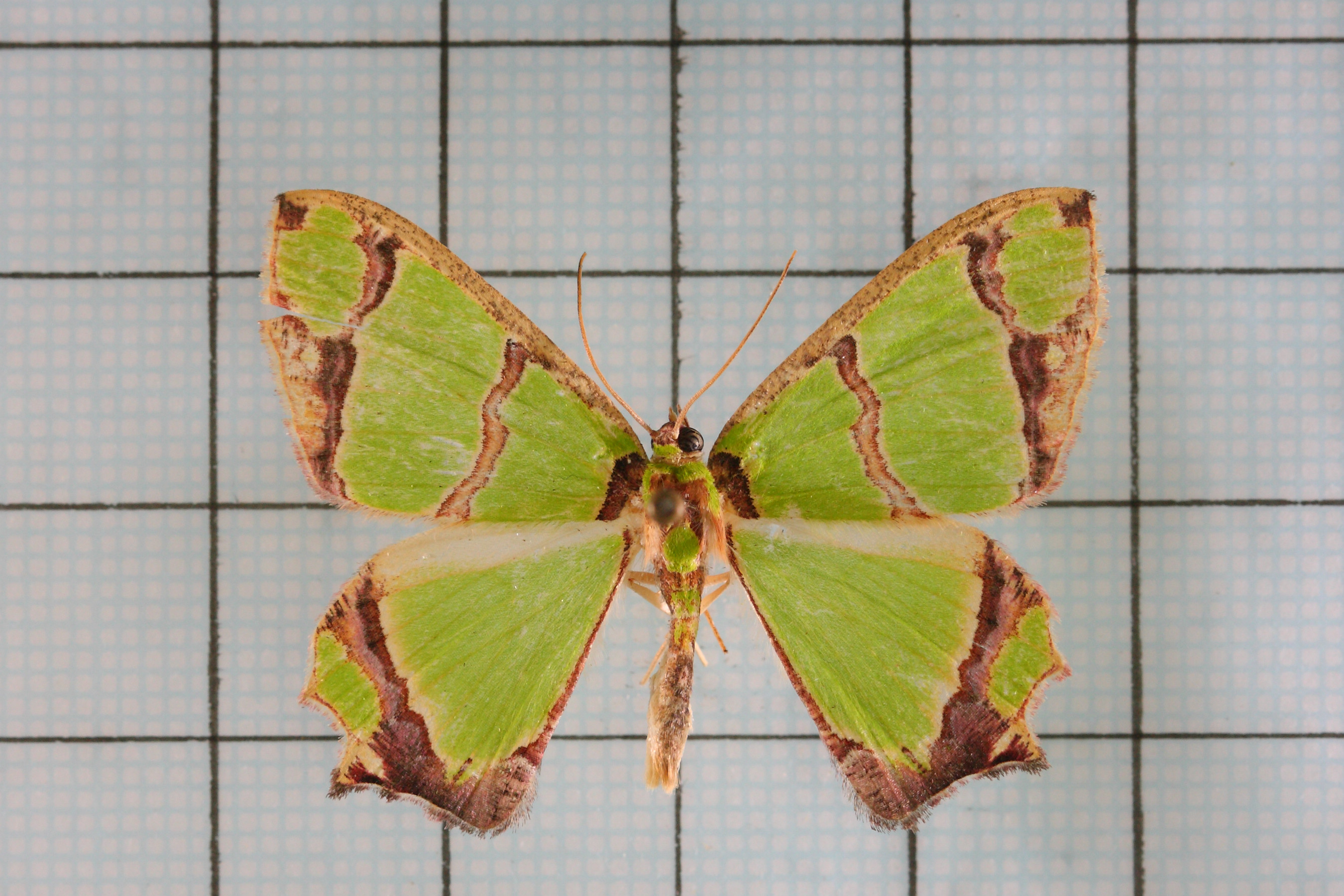

Scientific classification
- Kingdom: Animalia
- Phylum: Arthropoda
- Clade: Pancrustacea
- Class: Insecta
- Order: Lepidoptera
- Family: Geometridae
- Genus: Agathia
- Species: A. magnificentia

Binomial name
- Agathia magnificentia Inoue, 1978

= Agathia magnificentia =

Species of moth

Agathia magnificentia is a moth of the family Geometridae. It was first described by Hiroshi Inoue in 1978. It is endemic to Taiwan.

The wingspan is 38–45 mm. The adults are on wing from March to OCtober.
