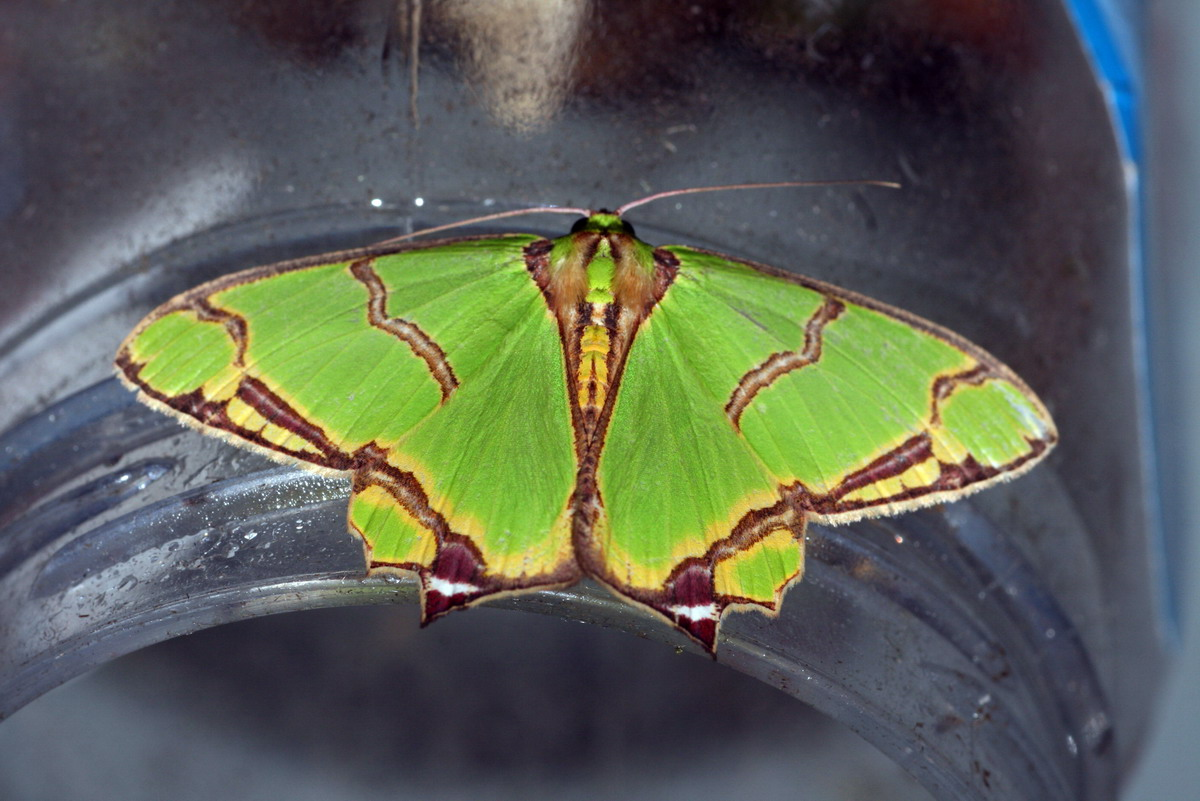

Scientific classification
- Domain: Eukaryota
- Kingdom: Animalia
- Phylum: Arthropoda
- Class: Insecta
- Order: Lepidoptera
- Family: Geometridae
- Genus: Agathia
- Species: A. succedanea

Binomial name
- Agathia succedanea Warren, 1897

= Agathia succedanea =

Species of moth

Agathia succedanea is a species of moth of the family Geometridae first described by William Warren in 1897. It is found on Borneo and Sumatra.
