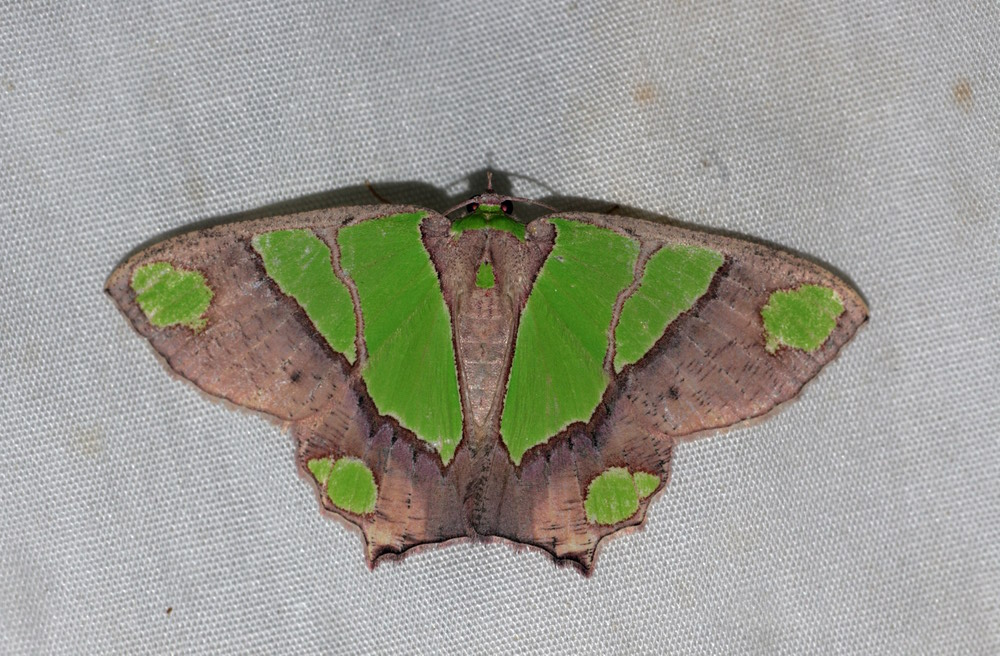

Scientific classification
- Kingdom: Animalia
- Phylum: Arthropoda
- Clade: Pancrustacea
- Class: Insecta
- Order: Lepidoptera
- Family: Geometridae
- Genus: Agathia
- Species: A. largita

Binomial name
- Agathia largita Holloway, 1996

= Agathia largita =

Species of moth

Agathia largita is a species of moth of the family Geometridae first described by Jeremy Daniel Holloway in 1996. It is found on Borneo and Sumatra.

The wingspan is 17–18 mm.
