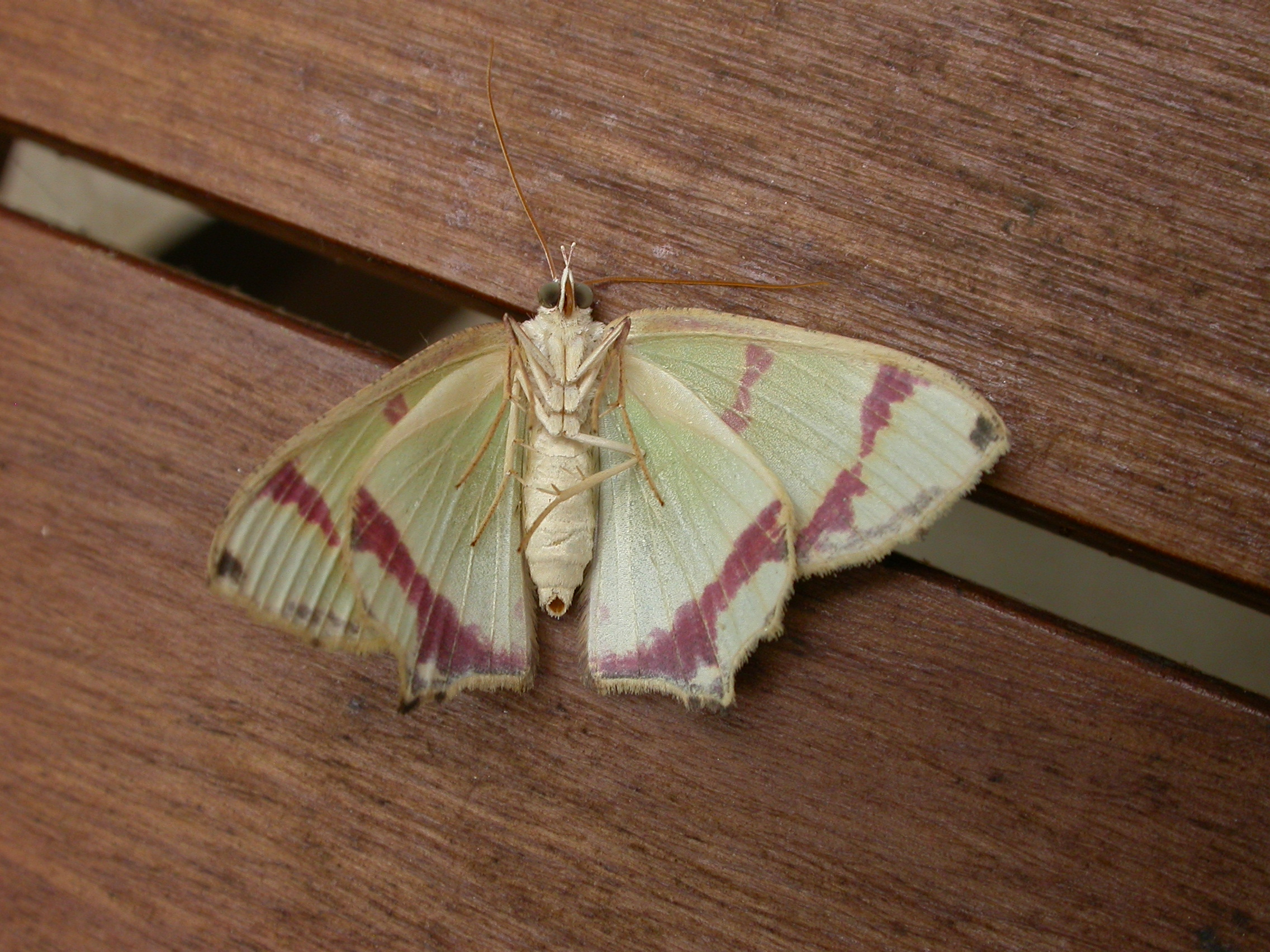

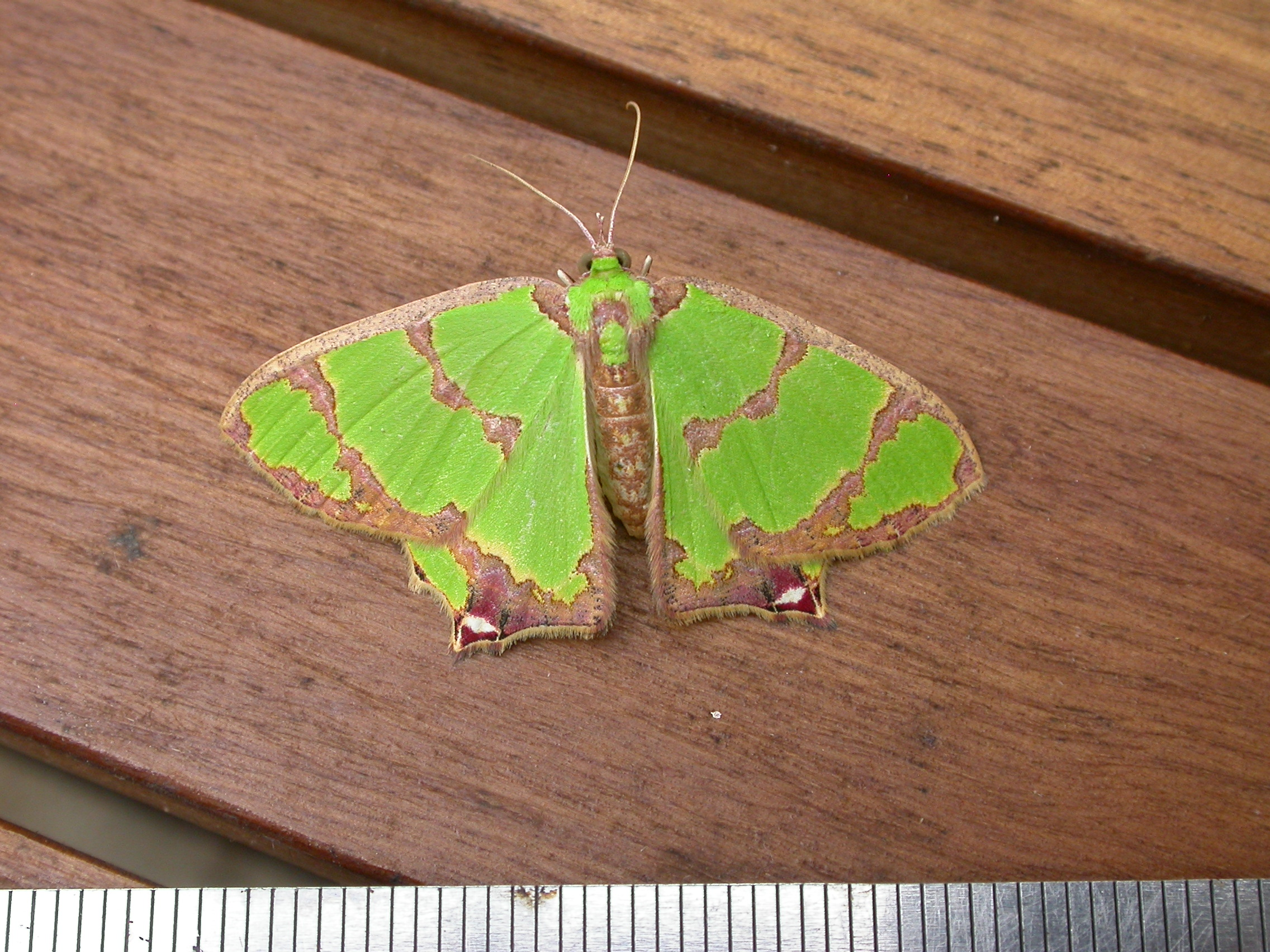

Scientific classification
- Kingdom: Animalia
- Phylum: Arthropoda
- Clade: Pancrustacea
- Class: Insecta
- Order: Lepidoptera
- Family: Geometridae
- Genus: Agathia
- Species: A. pisina

Binomial name
- Agathia pisina Butler, 1887

Synonyms
- Agathia asterias Meyrick, 1888; Agathia diversilinea Warren, 1896; Agathia ampla Prout, 1911; Agathia dimota Prout, 1911; Agathia irregularis Prout, 1916

= Agathia pisina =

Species of moth

Agathia pisina is a species of moth of the family Geometridae first described by Arthur Gardiner Butler in 1887. It is found in Australia (including Queensland) and Norfolk Island.

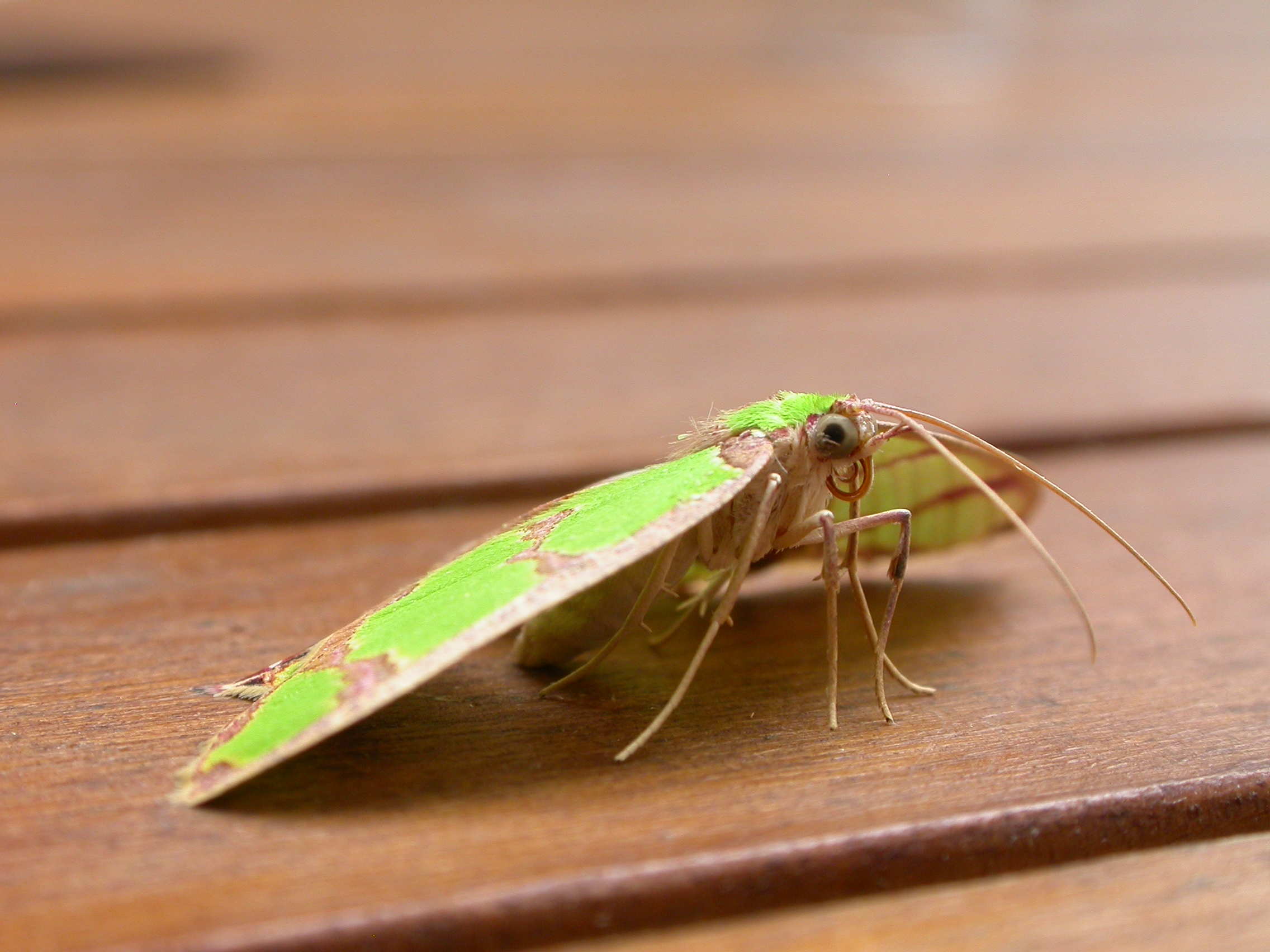

The larvae feed on Gymnanthera oblonga.
