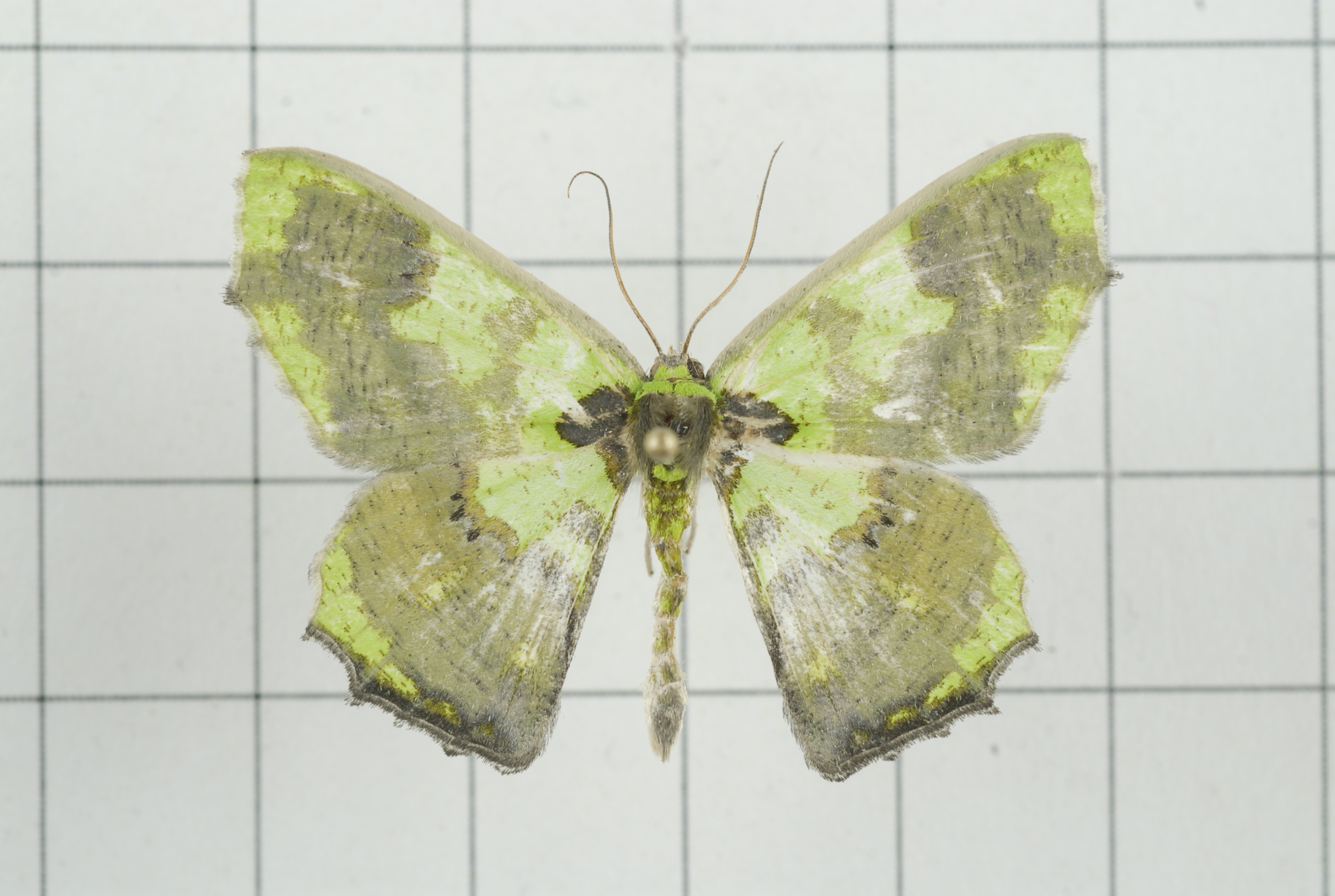

Scientific classification
- Kingdom: Animalia
- Phylum: Arthropoda
- Class: Insecta
- Order: Lepidoptera
- Family: Geometridae
- Genus: Agathia
- Species: A. diversiformis

Binomial name
- Agathia diversiformis Warren, 1894

= Agathia diversiformis =

Species of moth

Agathia diversiformis is a species of moth of the family Geometridae first described by William Warren in 1894. It is found in the north-eastern parts of the Himalayas.
