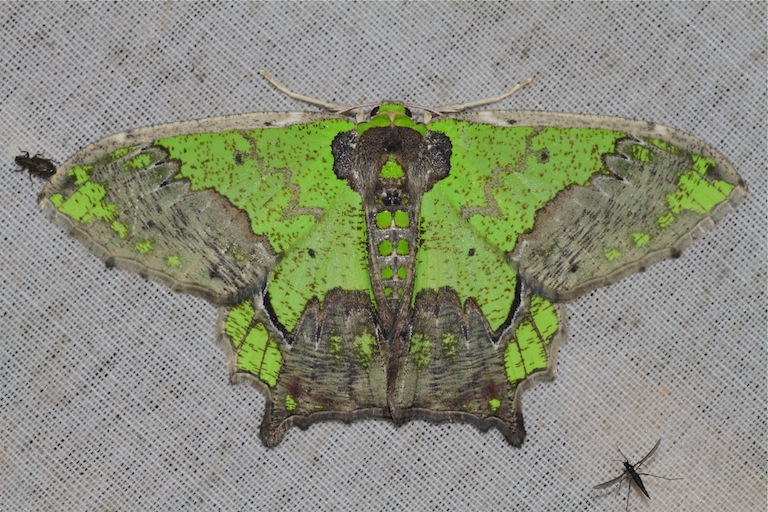
- Agathia codina australis from Borneo

Scientific classification
- Kingdom: Animalia
- Phylum: Arthropoda
- Class: Insecta
- Order: Lepidoptera
- Family: Geometridae
- Genus: Agathia
- Species: A. codina

Binomial name
- Agathia codina C. Swinhoe, 1892

= Agathia codina =

Species of moth

Agathia codina is a species of moth in the family Geometridae first described by Charles Swinhoe in 1892. It is found in the north-eastern parts of the Himalaya, Peninsular Malaysia, Sumatra and Borneo.

== Subspecies ==
- Agathia codina codina (Himalayas)
- Agathia codina australis (Peninsular Malaysia, Sumatra and Borneo)
