= Agathia gigantea =

Scientific classification
- Kingdom: Animalia
- Phylum: Arthropoda
- Class: Insecta
- Order: Lepidoptera
- Family: Geometridae
- Genus: Agathia
- Species: A. gigantea

Binomial name
- Agathia gigantea Butler, 1880

Species of moth

Agathia gigantea is a species of moth of the family Geometridae first described by Arthur Gardiner Butler in 1880. It is found in Java, Sumatra, Peninsular Malaysia and Borneo.
