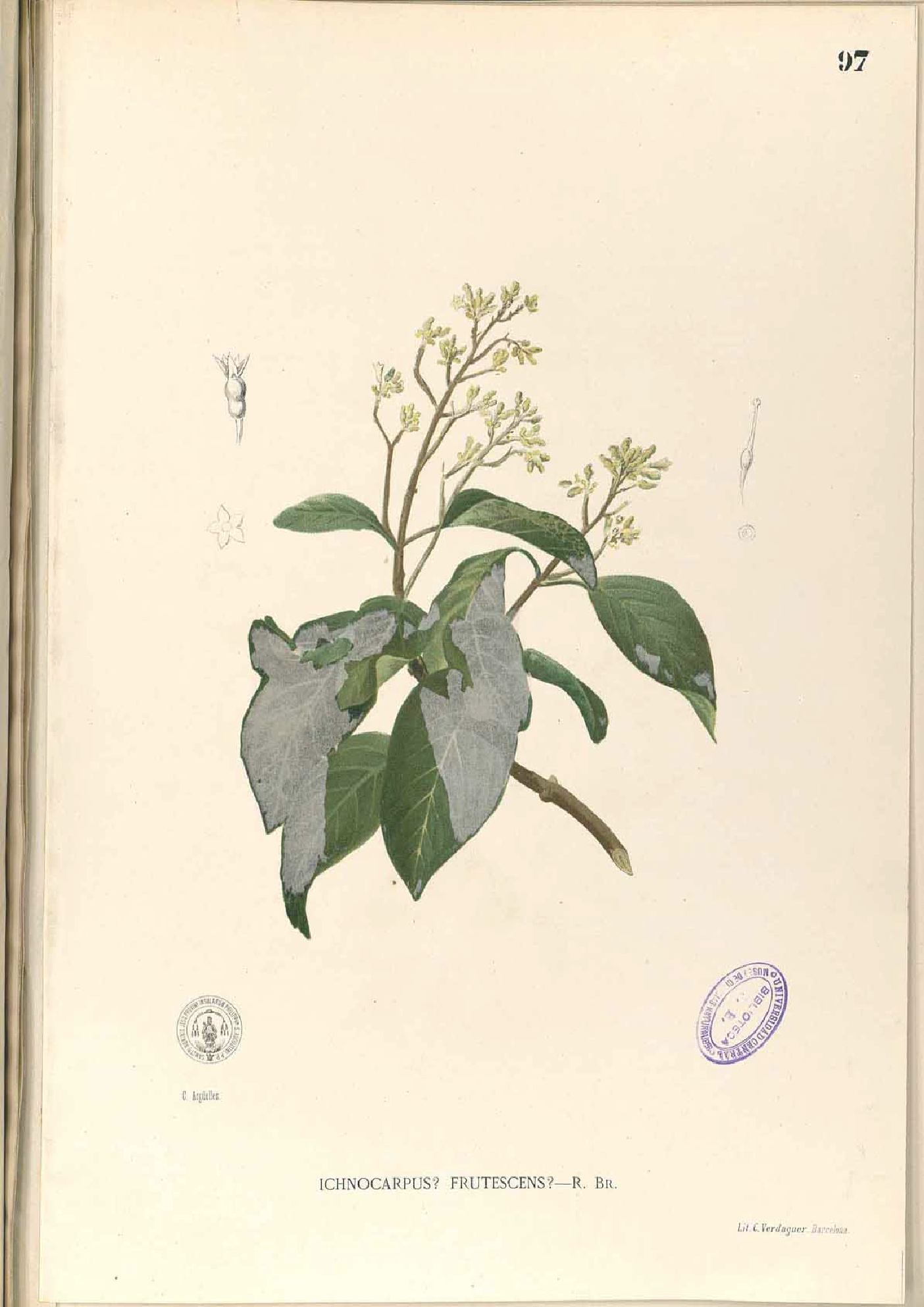
- Ichnocarpus frutescens

Scientific classification
- Kingdom: Plantae
- Clade: Tracheophytes
- Clade: Angiosperms
- Clade: Eudicots
- Clade: Asterids
- Order: Gentianales
- Family: Apocynaceae
- Subfamily: Apocynoideae
- Tribe: Apocyneae
- Genus: Ichnocarpus; R.Br.

Synonyms
- Micraochites Rolfe; Quirivelia Poir.; Springia Van Heurck & Müll.Arg.

= Ichnocarpus =

Genus of plants

Ichnocarpus is a genus of plant in the family Apocynaceae first described as a genus in 1810. It is native to China, the Indian subcontinent, + Southeast Asia.

Species

- Ichnocarpus frutescens (L.) W.T.Aiton - Fujian, Guangdong, Guangxi, Guizhou, Hainan, Yunnan, Bangladesh, Bhutan, Cambodia, India, Indonesia, Laos, Malaysia, Myanmar, Nepal, New Guinea, Pakistan, Philippines, Sri Lanka, Thailand, Vietnam, N Australia
- Ichnocarpus fulvus Kerr - Thailand, Vietnam
- Ichnocarpus uliginosus Kerr - N Thailand
