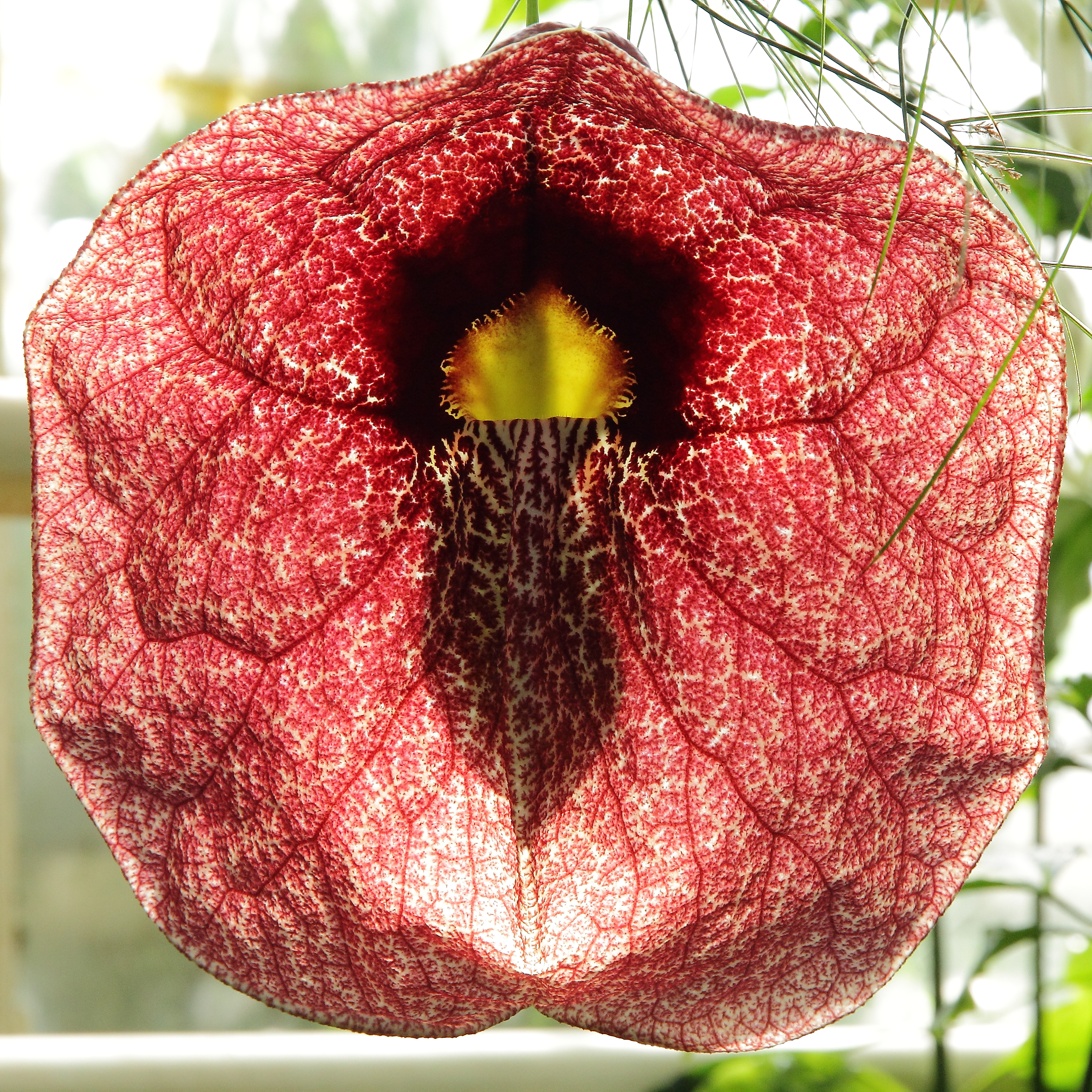

Scientific classification
- Kingdom: Plantae
- Clade: Tracheophytes
- Clade: Angiosperms
- Clade: Magnoliids
- Order: Piperales
- Family: Aristolochiaceae
- Genus: Aristolochia
- Species: A. gigantea

Binomial name
- Aristolochia gigantea Mart. & Zucc.

= Aristolochia gigantea =

Species of flowering plant

== Aristolochia gigantea ==
Aristolochia gigantea, the Brazilian Dutchman's pipe or giant pelican flower (syn. Aristolochia sylvicola Standl.), is an ornamental plant native to Brazil, Costa Rica and Panama. Typical of subtropical Bahia and Minas Gerais vegetation. This plant is cited in Flora Brasiliensis by Carl Friedrich Philipp von Martius. A. gigantea and other tropical Dutchman's pipe varieties pose a threat to the pipevine swallowtail butterfly. The butterfly confuses A. gigantea with its native host plant and will lay eggs on it although pipevine swallowtail caterpillars cannot survive on the foliage because the leaves are toxic to the larvae.

=== Cultivation ===
In cultivation in the UK - where it must be grown under glass - this plant has gained the Royal Horticultural Society's Award of Garden Merit. It does not tolerate temperatures below 10 °C (50 °F). It can be grown from seeds or cuttings.

=== Morphology ===
It is a vigorous woody evergreen climber (vine). Leaves are simple with a cordate heart shape and a petiole. Inflorescence has a single zygomorphic (bilateral) flower that is bisexual. Contains 6 stamens that are fused to form a gynostemium. There is a syncarpous gynoecium present. The face of the flower is oval with a fine network of pale pink or whitish veins on a maroon background. The rear of the flower is globular. The throat is yellow.

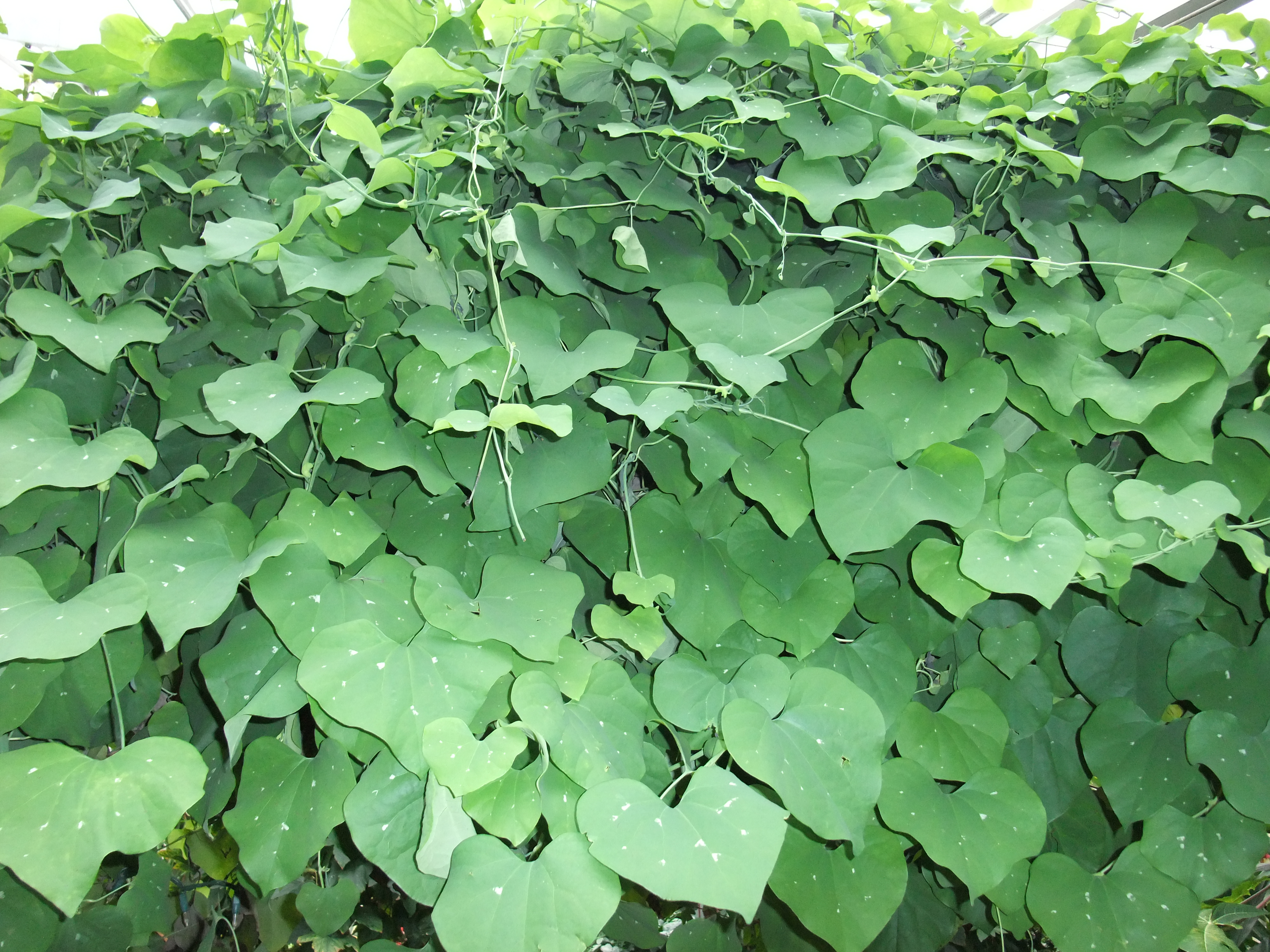

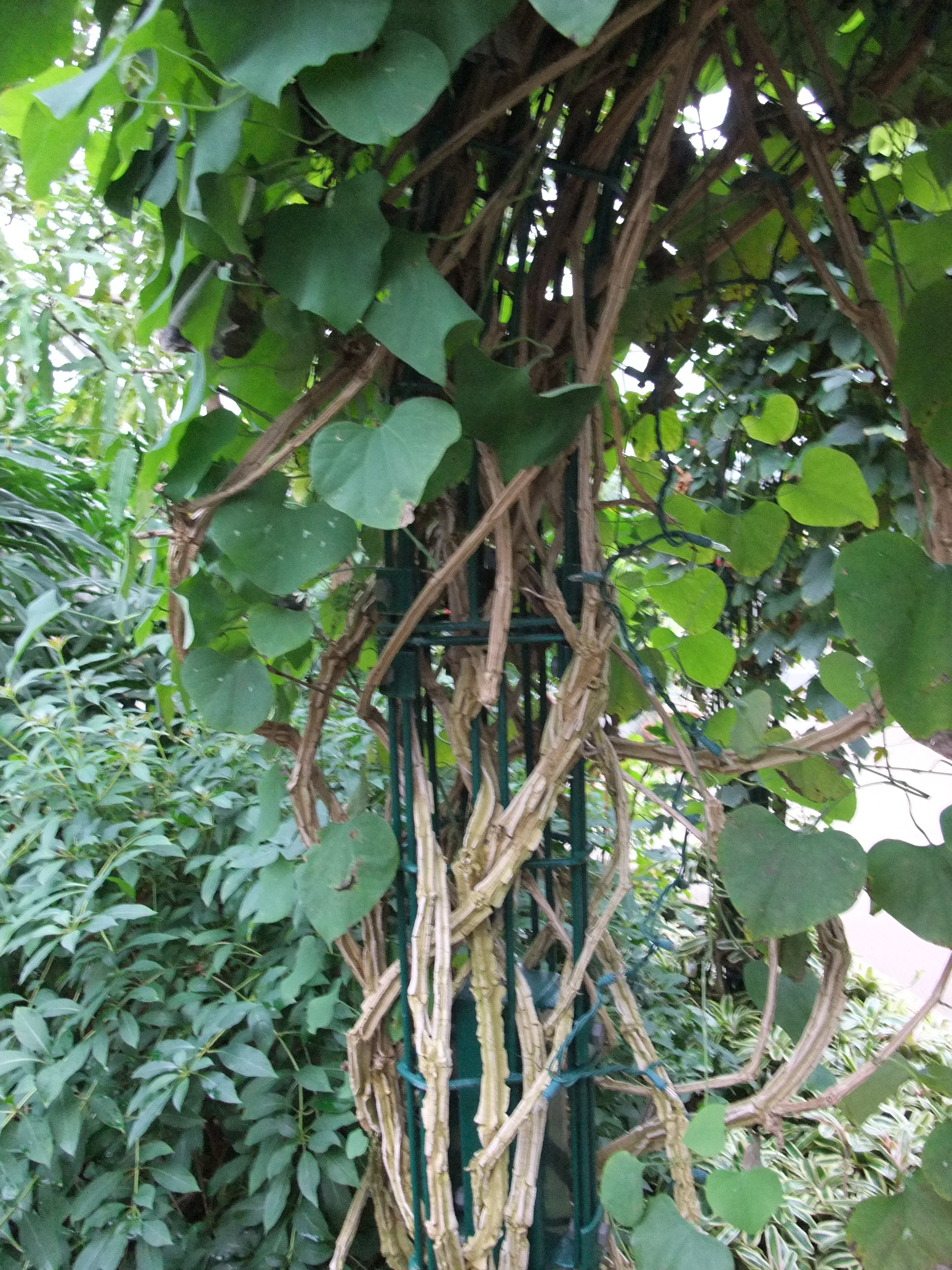
