= Tabernaemontana rostrata =

Scientific classification
- Kingdom: Plantae
- Clade: Embryophytes
- Clade: Tracheophytes
- Clade: Spermatophytes
- Clade: Angiosperms
- Clade: Eudicots
- Clade: Asterids
- Order: Gentianales
- Family: Apocynaceae
- Genus: Tabernaemontana
- Species: T. rostrata

Binomial name
- Tabernaemontana rostrata Wall.

Synonyms
- List: Ervatamia calyculata Markgr.; Ervatamia curtisii King & Gamble; Ervatamia cylindrocarpa King & Gamble; Ervatamia evrardii (Pit.) Pichon; Ervatamia garciniifolia (Pierre ex Pit.) Kerr; Ervatamia pitardii (Gagnep.) Kerr; Ervatamia rostrata (Wall.) Markgr.; Tabernaemontana cylindrocarpa (King & Gamble) Merr.; Tabernaemontana evrardii Pit.; Tabernaemontana garciniifolia Pierre ex Pit.; Tabernaemontana micrantha Voigt; Tabernaemontana nicobarica Liebm.; Tabernaemontana parviflora Roxb.; Tabernaemontana pitardii Gagnep.

Species of plant

Tabernaemontana rostrata grows as a shrub up to 2 m (7 ft) tall. Its flowers feature a white corolla. Its habitat is scrub or forest to 1,400 m (4,600 ft) altitude. The species is native to Bangladesh, Indo-China and Malesia.
