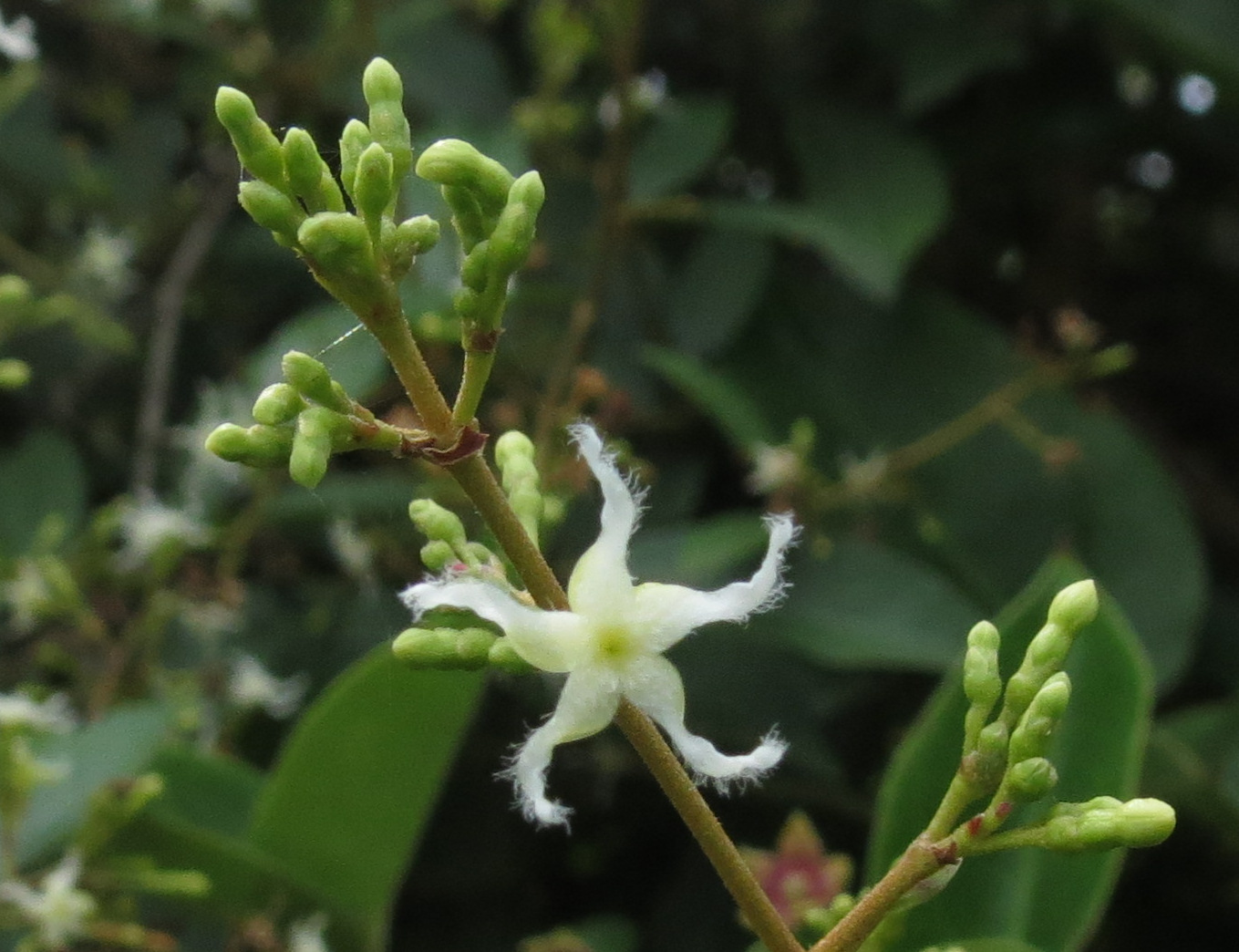

Scientific classification
- Kingdom: Plantae
- Clade: Tracheophytes
- Clade: Angiosperms
- Clade: Eudicots
- Clade: Asterids
- Order: Gentianales
- Family: Apocynaceae
- Genus: Ichnocarpus
- Species: I. frutescens

Binomial name
- Ichnocarpus frutescens (L.) W.T.Aiton

Synonyms
- Aganosma affinis (Roem. & Schult.) G.Don; Apocynum crassifolium Salisb.; Apocynum frutescens L.; Beluttakaka malabarica Kuntze; Carruthersia daronensis Elmer; Chonemorpha bantamensis G.Don; Chonemorpha malabarica G.Don; Echites affinis Roem. & Schult.; Echites bantamensis Blume; Echites caryophyllatus Roth; Echites caudatus Blanco; Echites ferrugineus Thunb.; Echites frutescens (L.) Roxb.; Echites malabaricus Lam.; Echites trichonemus Zipp. ex Span.; Ichnocarpus affinis (Roem. & Schult.) Hook.f. & Thomson; Ichnocarpus bantamensis (Blume) Miq.; Ichnocarpus dasycalyx Miq.; Ichnocarpus leptodictyus F.Muell.; Ichnocarpus microcalyx Pit.; Ichnocarpus moluccanus Miq.; Ichnocarpus navesii Rolfe; Ichnocarpus ovatifolius A.DC.; Ichnocarpus oxypetalus Pit.; Ichnocarpus sogerensis Wernham ex S.Moore; Ichnocarpus volubilis (Lour.) Merr.; Micrechites sinensis Markgr.; Periploca palvallii Dennst.; Quirivelia bantamensis (Blume) F.N.Williams; Quirivelia frutescens (L.) M.R.Almeida & S.M.Almeida; Quirivelia zeylanica Poir.; Springia indica Van Heurck & Müll.Arg.; Tabernaemontana parviflora Poir.; Thyrsanthus parviflorus (Poir.) Miers; Gardenia sinensis Lour. ex B.A.Gomes; Gardenia volubilis Lour.

= Ichnocarpus frutescens =

Species of flowering plant

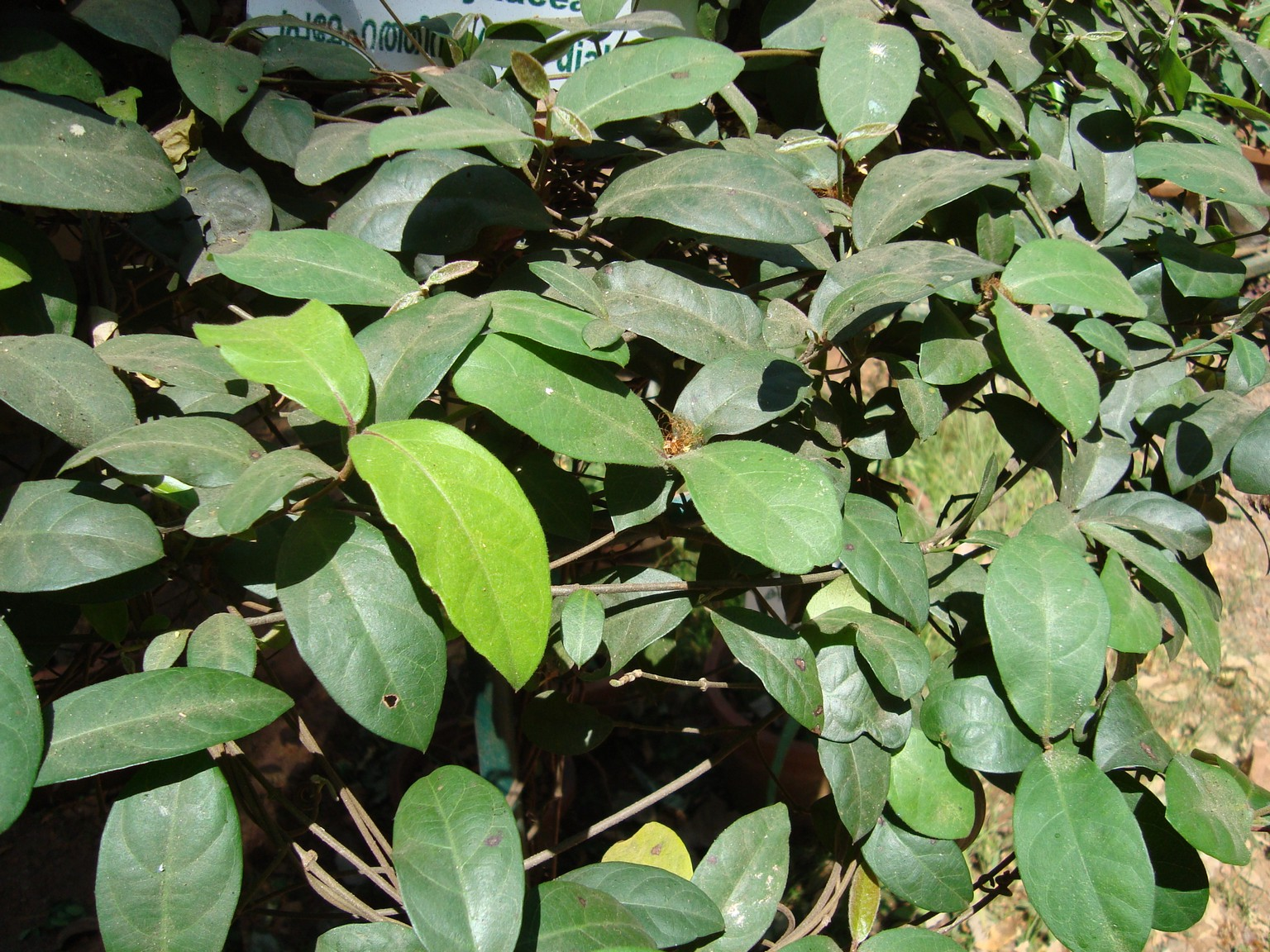
In Thrissur, India

Ichnocarpus frutescens is a species of flowering plant in the dogbane family Apocynaceae, known by the English common name black creeper. It is native to much of China, India, Southeast Asia, and northern Australia.

It is a woody shrub with lianas sprawling to 10 m (33 ft) in maximum length and 6 cm (2.4 in) in diameter. The bark produces a creamy white sap. The leaves are up to 11 cm (4.3 in) long by 4.5 cm (1.8 in) wide. The inflorescence is a head of several flowers. Each flower has a calyx of densely hairy sepals and a five lobed corolla just under a centimeter long. The fruit is a follicle which may be over 14 cm (5.5 in) long. The roots may be reddish or purple. The plant is sold in markets in some areas in India.

== Uses ==
The plant has a large number of traditional medicinal uses, including for rheumatism, asthma, cholera, and fever. Some in vitro and rodent studies have suggested that extracts of the plant may inhibit tumors, protect liver cells from damage in acetaminophen overdose, and reduces complications of hyperlipidemia in diabetic rats. There have been no published studies testing any of these effects in humans.

The fibrous bark is used to make rope.
