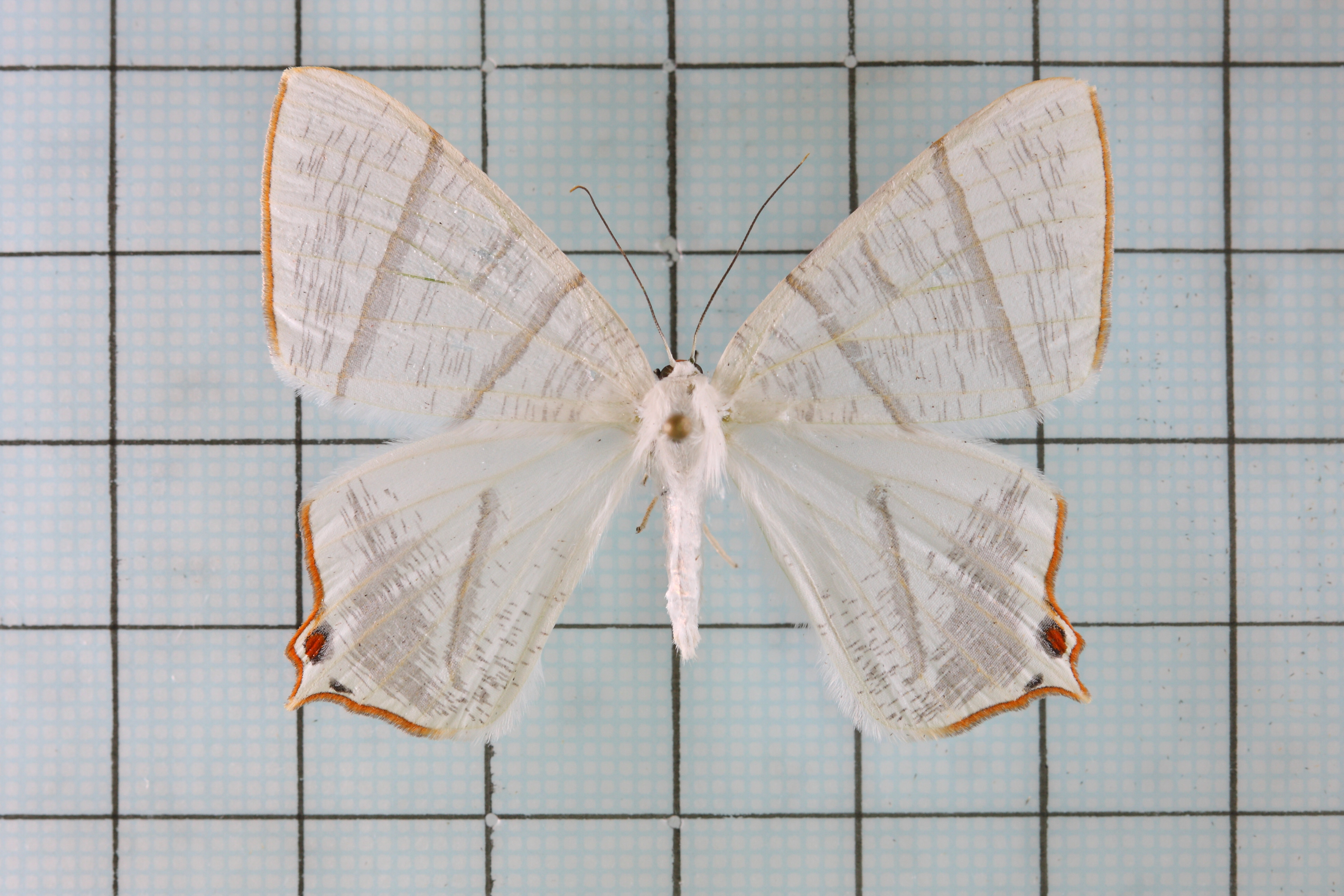
- Ourapteryx similaria horishana

Scientific classification
- Domain: Eukaryota
- Kingdom: Animalia
- Phylum: Arthropoda
- Class: Insecta
- Order: Lepidoptera
- Family: Geometridae
- Genus: Ourapteryx
- Species: O. similaria

Binomial name
- Ourapteryx similaria Leech, 1897

= Ourapteryx similaria =

Species of moth

Ourapteryx similaria is a moth of the family Geometridae first described by John Henry Leech in 1897. It is found in China and Taiwan.

== Subspecies ==
- Ourapteryx similaria similaria (China)
- Ourapteryx similaria brachycerca Wehrli, 1939 (China)
- Ourapteryx similaria horishana Matsumura, 1910 (Taiwan)
