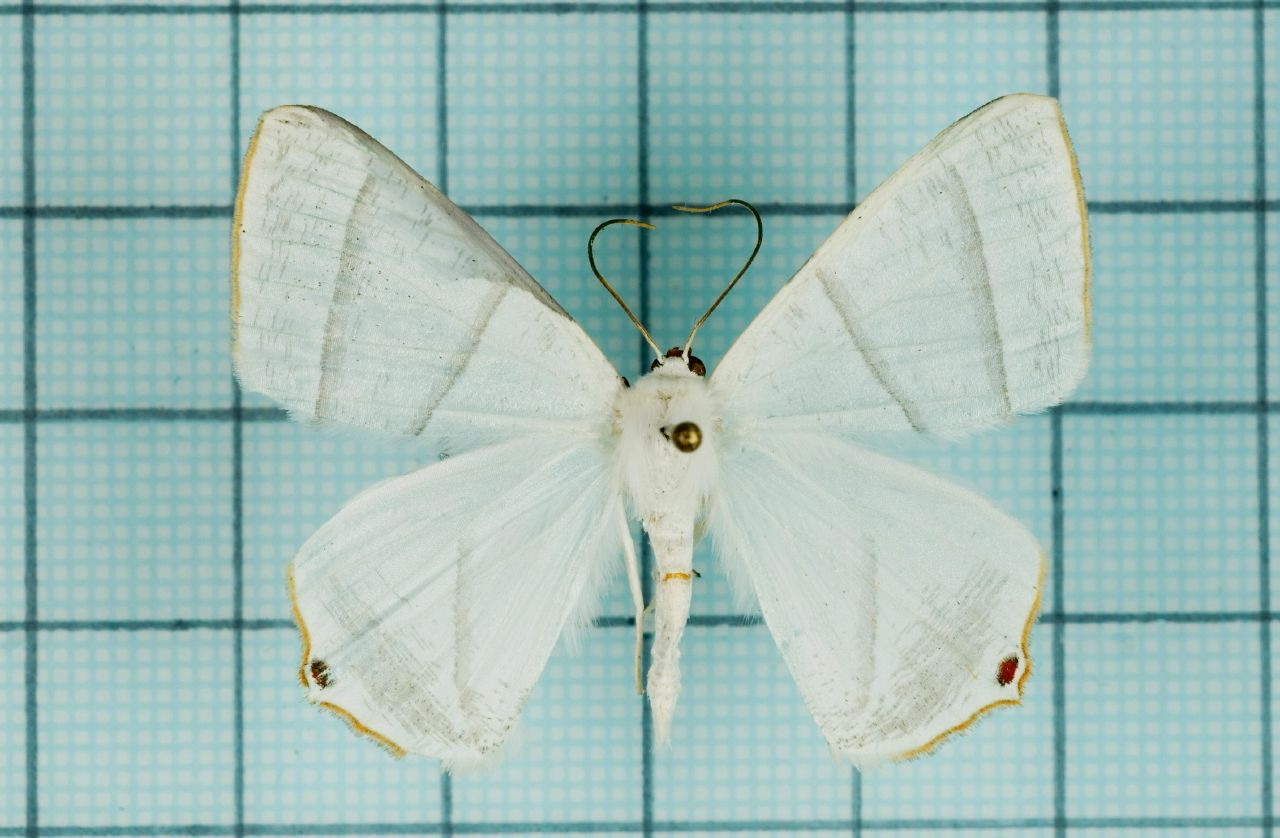

Scientific classification
- Domain: Eukaryota
- Kingdom: Animalia
- Phylum: Arthropoda
- Class: Insecta
- Order: Lepidoptera
- Family: Geometridae
- Genus: Ourapteryx
- Species: O. caecata

Binomial name
- Ourapteryx caecata (Bastelberger, 1911)

Synonyms
- Euctenurapteryx caecata Bastelberger, 1911

= Ourapteryx caecata =

Species of moth

Ourapteryx caecata is a moth of the family Geometridae. It is found in Taiwan.

The wingspan is 42–50 mm.
