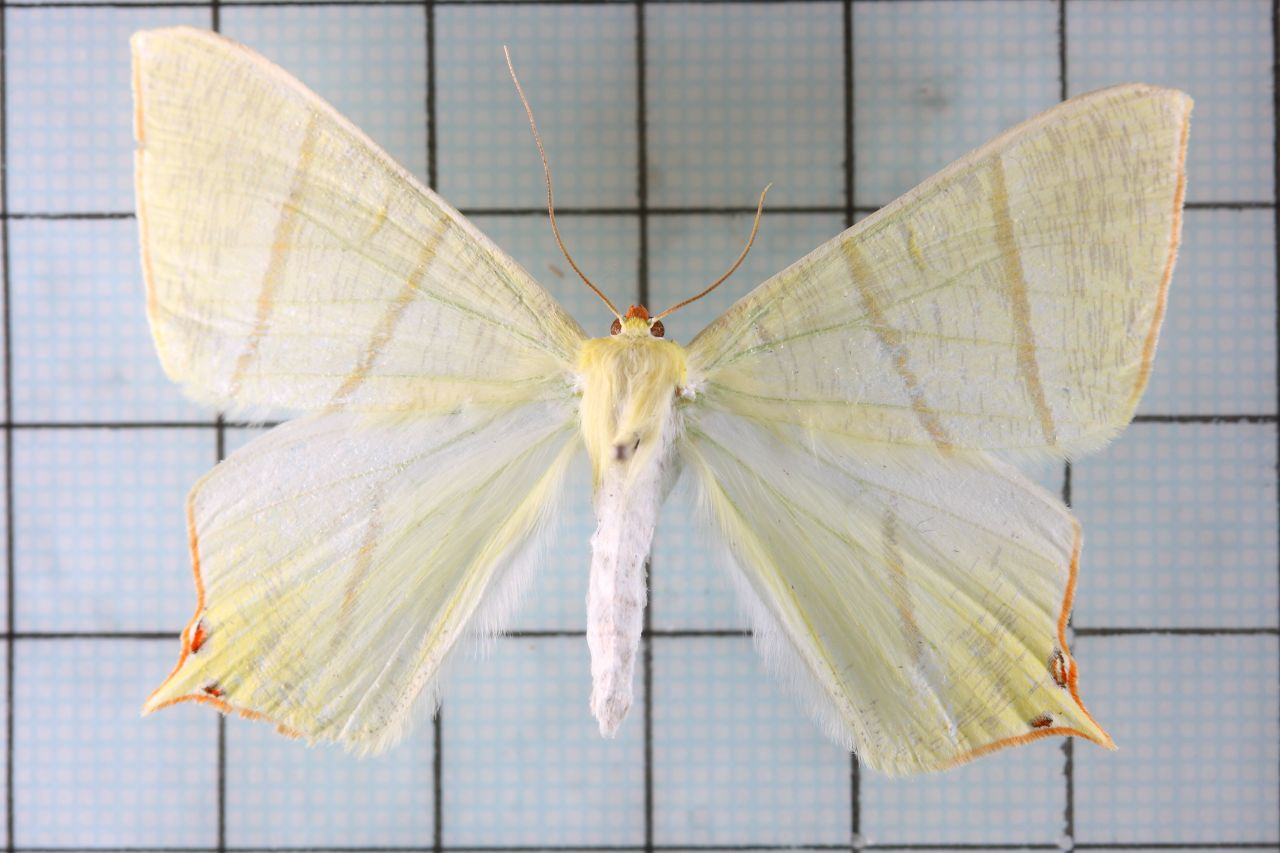

Scientific classification
- Kingdom: Animalia
- Phylum: Arthropoda
- Class: Insecta
- Order: Lepidoptera
- Family: Geometridae
- Genus: Ourapteryx
- Species: O. sciticaudaria

Binomial name
- Ourapteryx sciticaudaria Walker, 1863

= Ourapteryx sciticaudaria =

Species of moth

Ourapteryx sciticaudaria is a moth of the family Geometridae first described by Francis Walker in 1863. It is found in south-east Asia, including Taiwan, China, Thailand, India and Bhutan.
