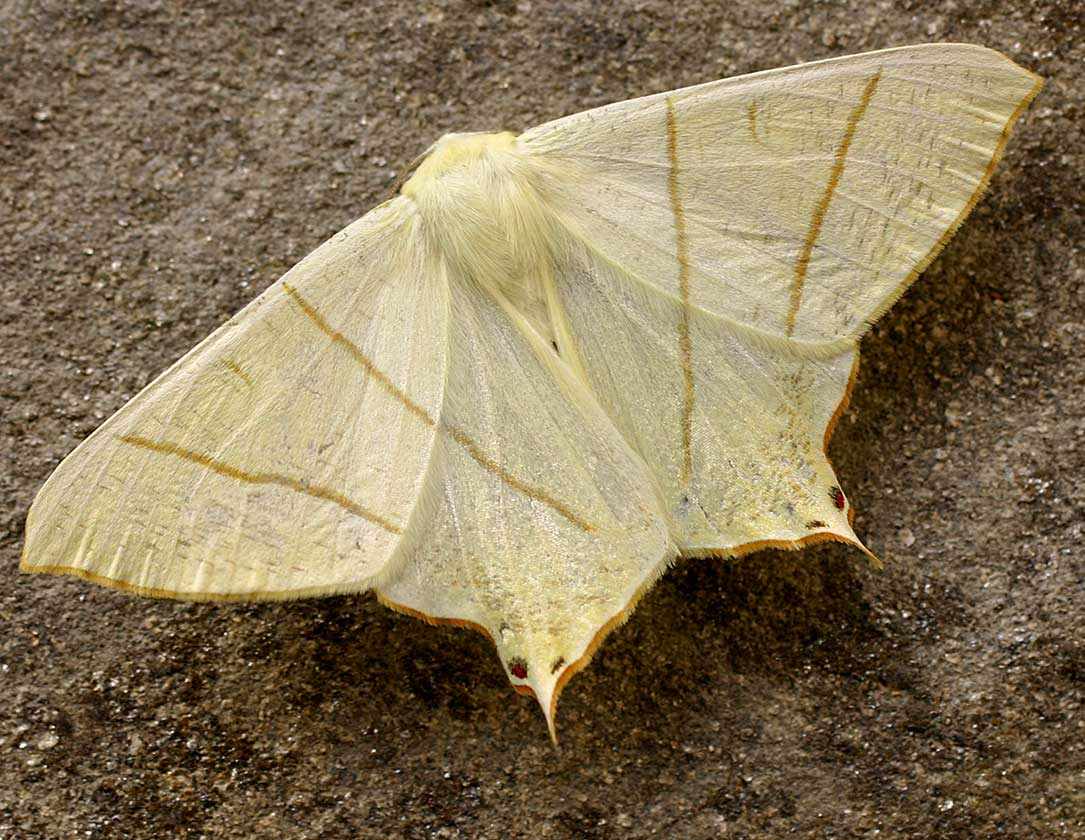

Scientific classification
- Kingdom: Animalia
- Phylum: Arthropoda
- Clade: Pancrustacea
- Class: Insecta
- Order: Lepidoptera
- Family: Geometridae
- Genus: Ourapteryx
- Species: O. sambucaria

Binomial name
- Ourapteryx sambucaria (Linnaeus, 1758)

Synonyms
- Phalaena sambucaria Linnaeus, 1758; Urapteryx sambucaria

= Swallow-tailed moth =

Species of moth

The swallow-tailed moth (Ourapteryx sambucaria) is a moth of the family Geometridae. The species was first described by Carl Linnaeus in his 1758 10th edition of Systema Naturae. It is a common species across Europe and the Near East.

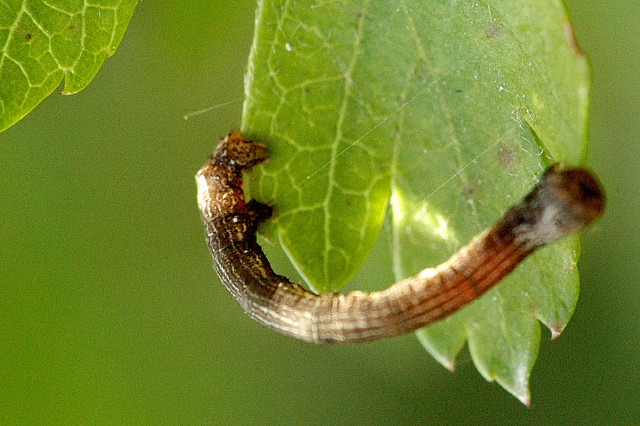
Caterpillar

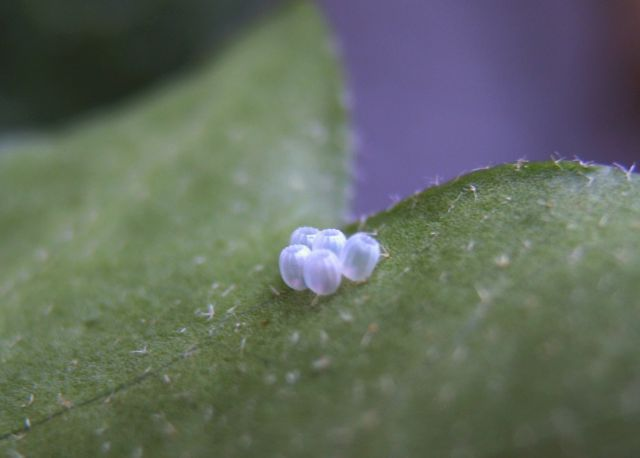
Eggs

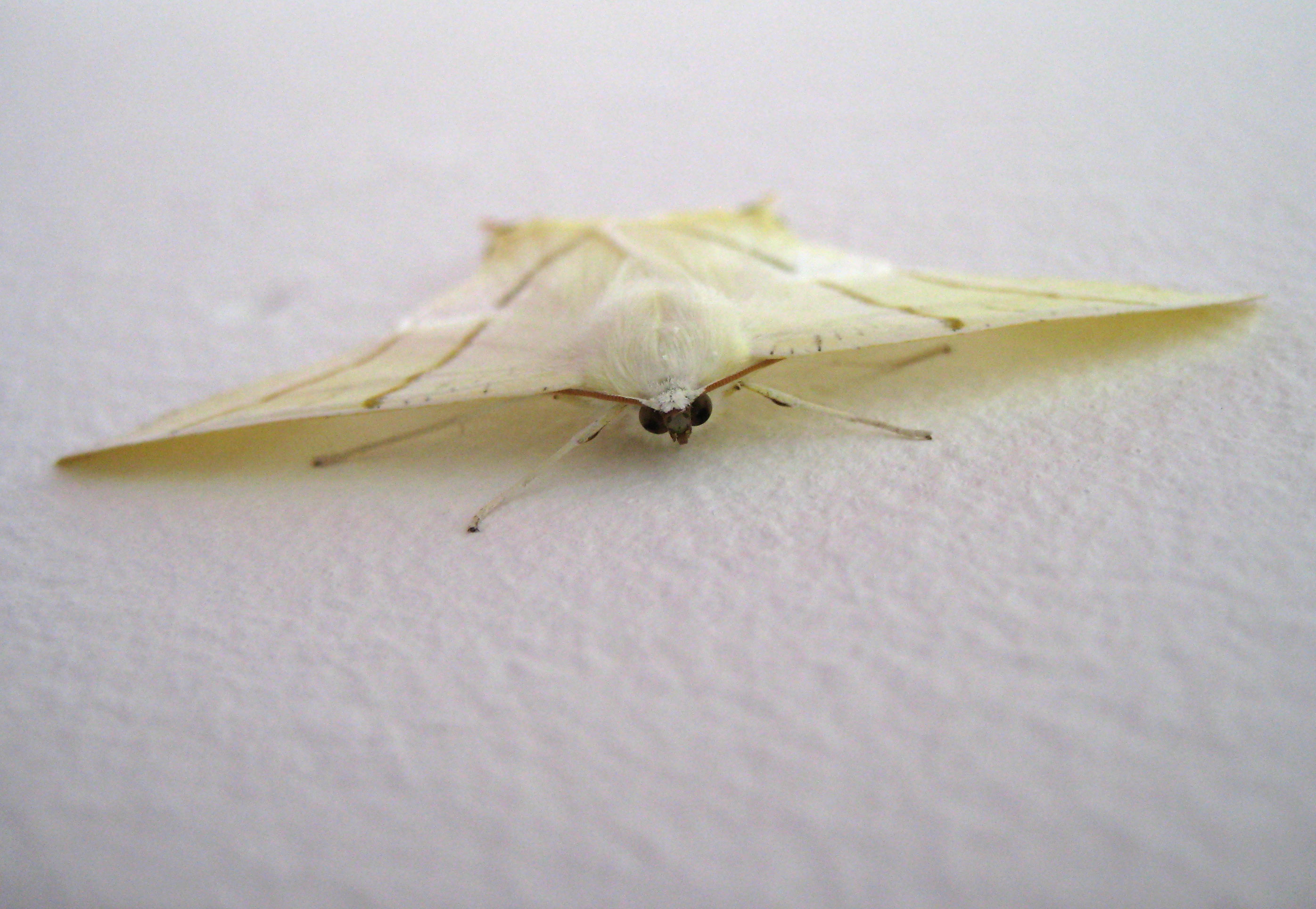
Front view

== Description ==
This is a large (wingspan 50–62 mm), impressive moth, remarkably butterfly-like. All parts of the adult are bright white to pale yellow marked with faint buffish fascia. The species gets its common name from pointed projections on the termen of the hindwing with brownish spots at their base. It flies at night in June and July and is attracted to light, sometimes in large numbers. Prout gives an account of the variations. The egg is orange, with about 16 longitudinal keels and between them transverse lineations. The larva is grey-brown, the colouring arranged in a succession of scarcely noticeable longitudinal lines.

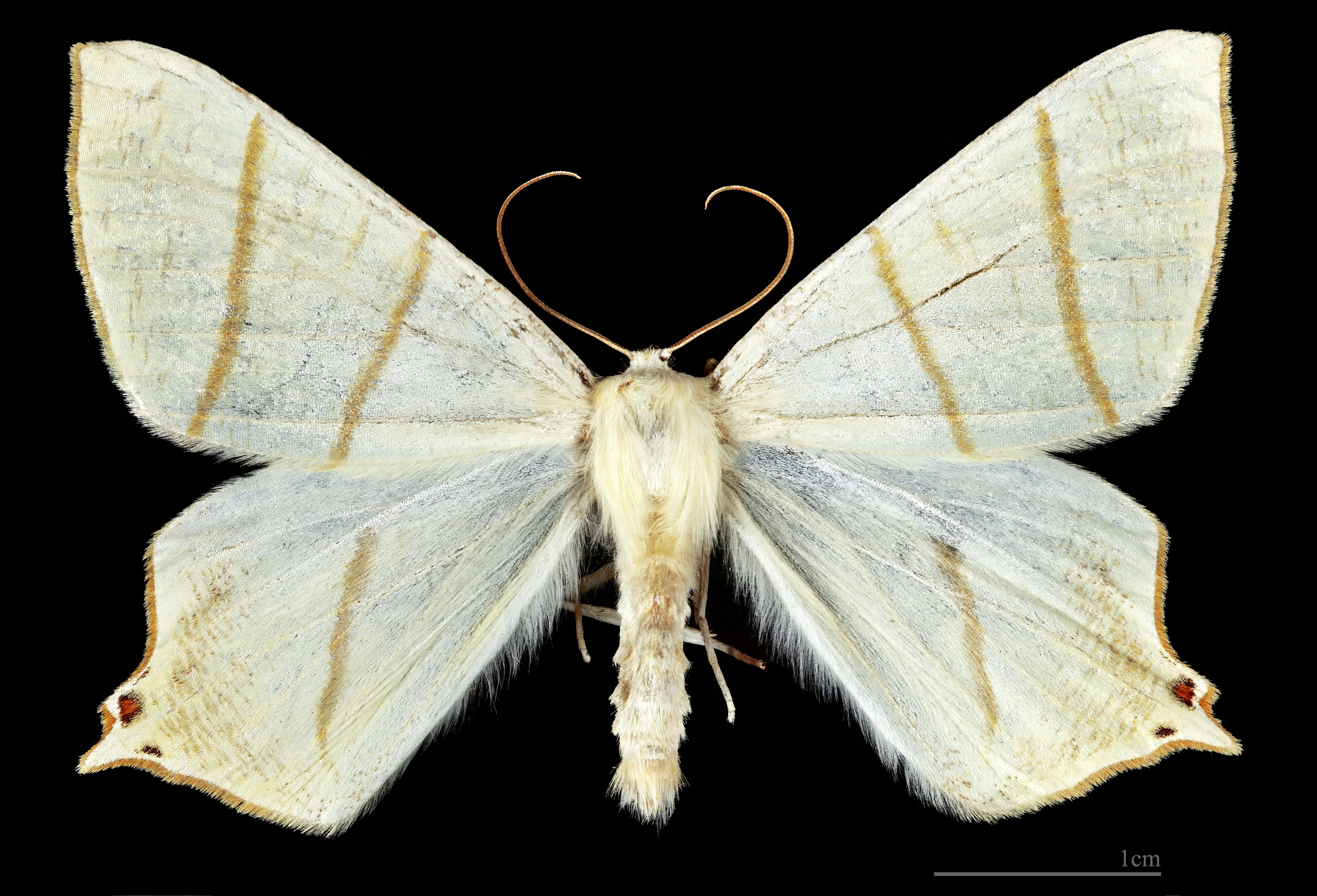
♂

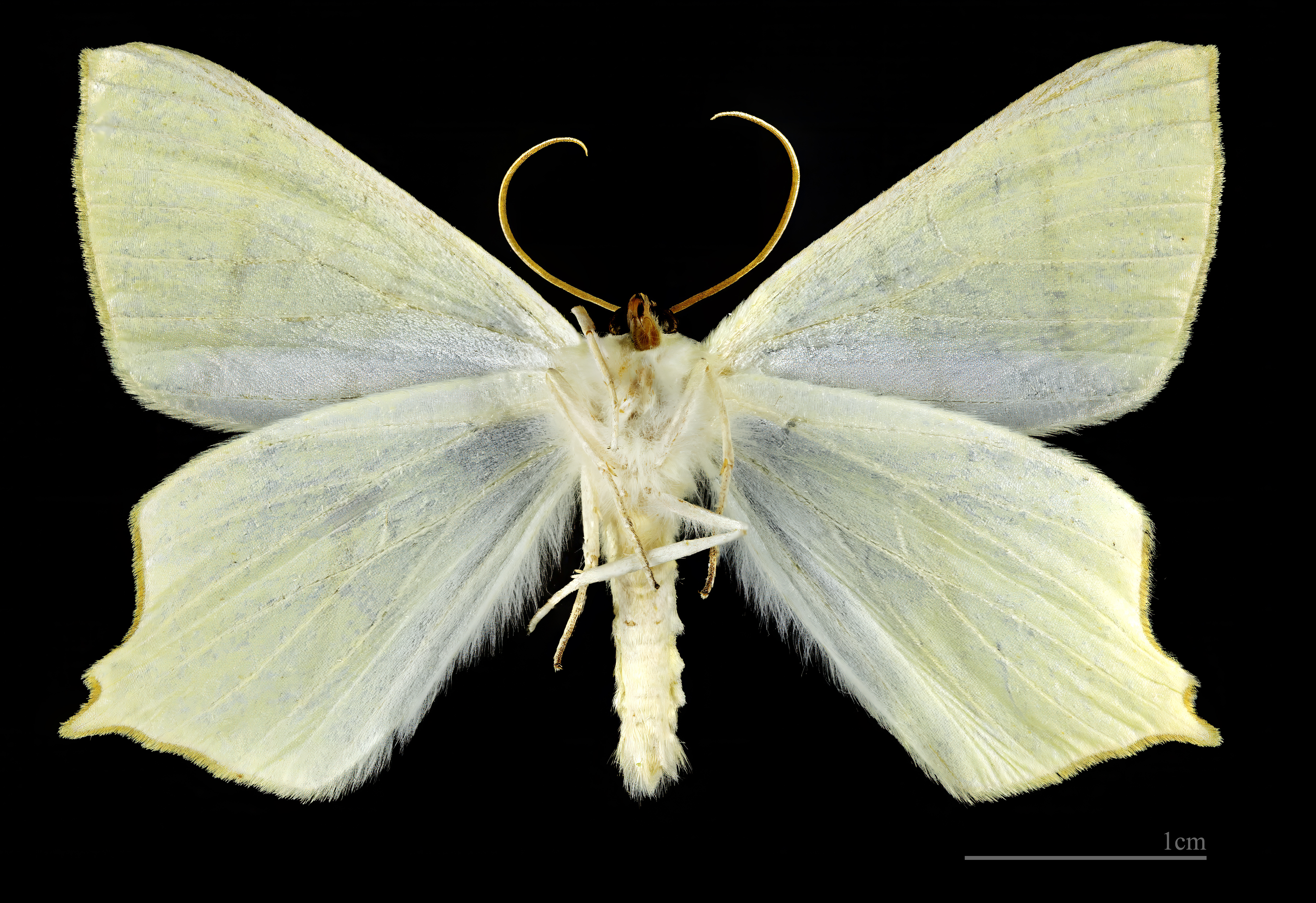
♂ △

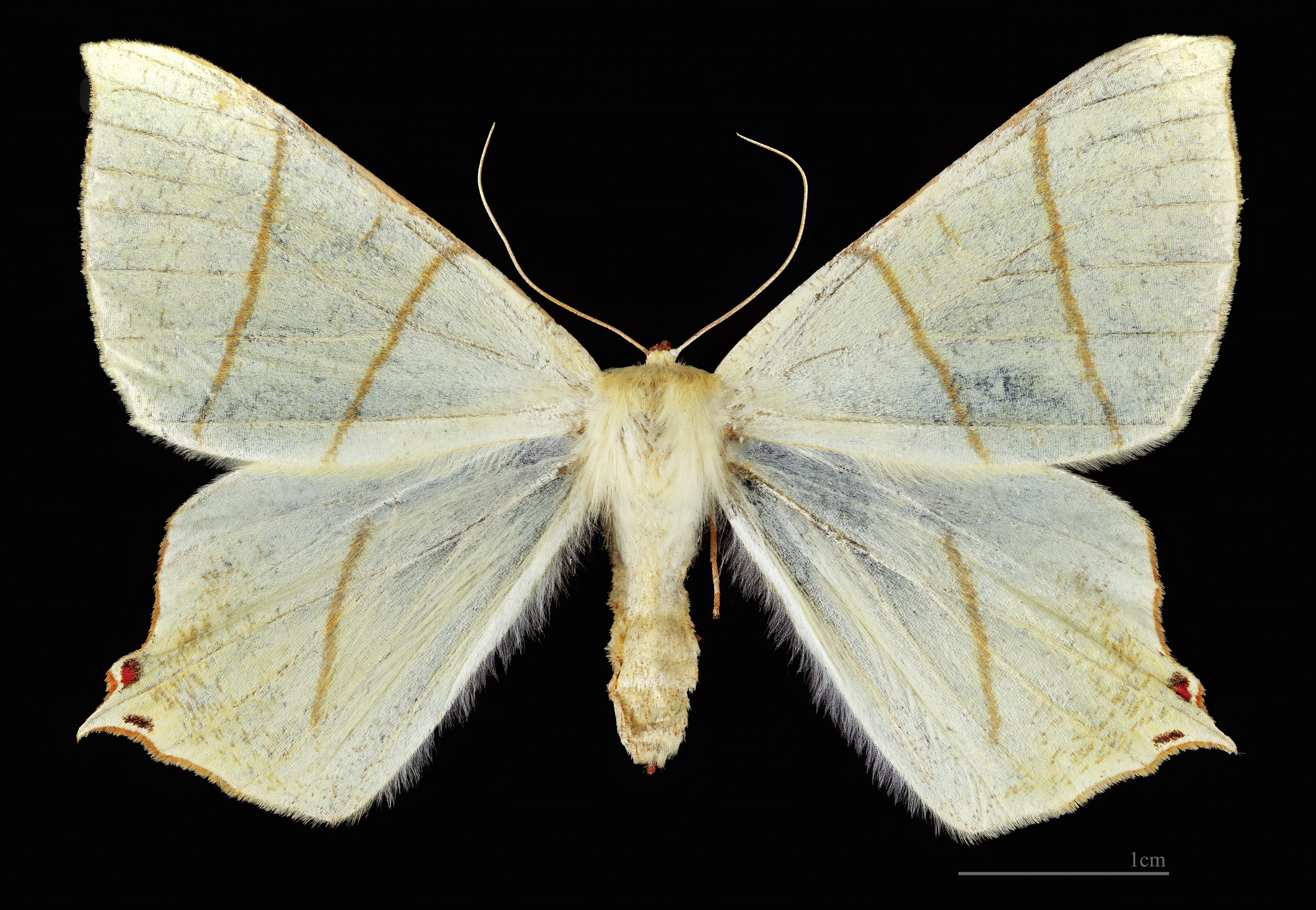
♀

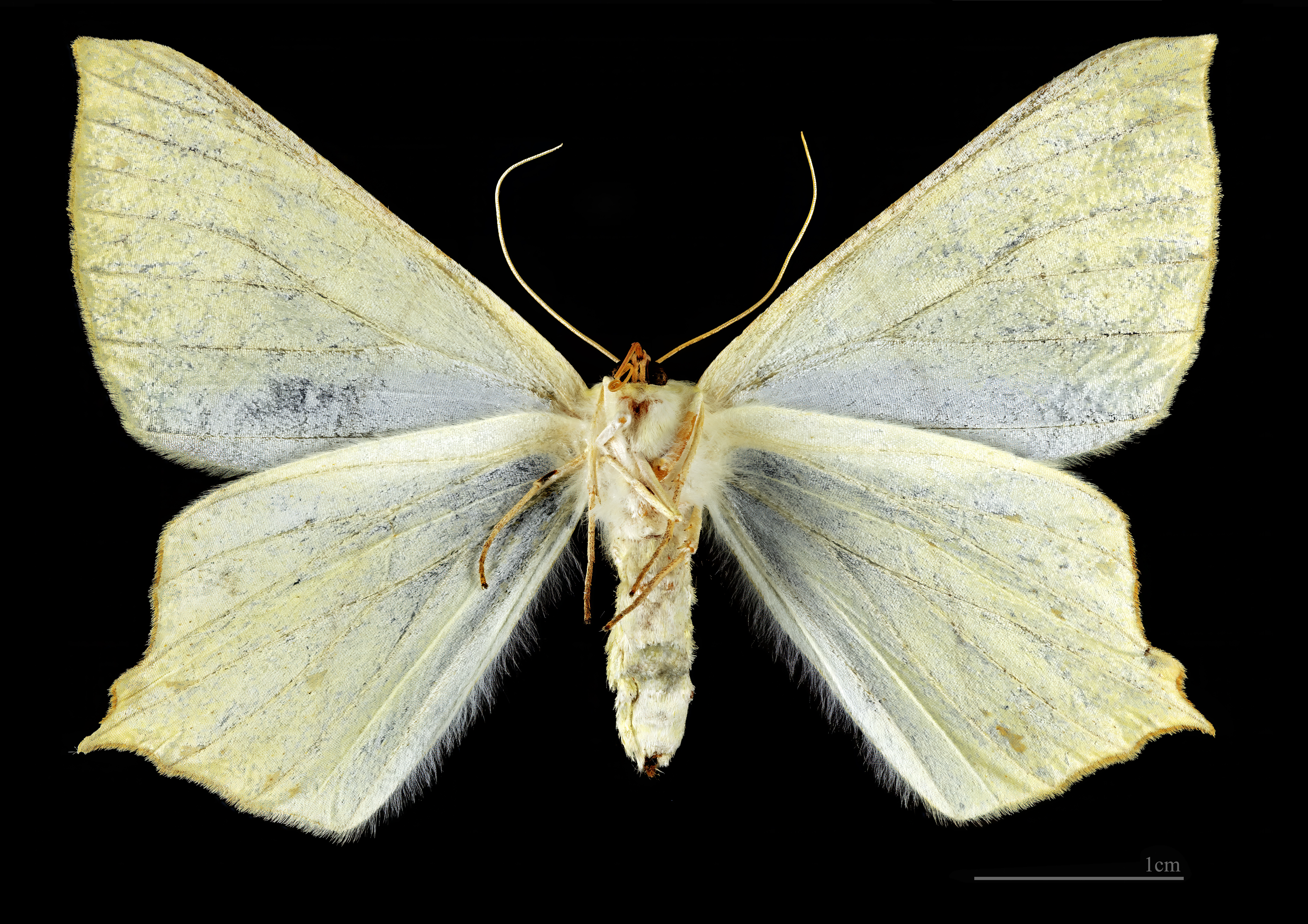
♀ △

The brown, twig-like larva feeds on a variety of trees and shrubs including elder, hawthorn, honeysuckle and ivy. The species overwinters as a larva.

1. The flight season refers to the British Isles. This may vary in other parts of the range.
