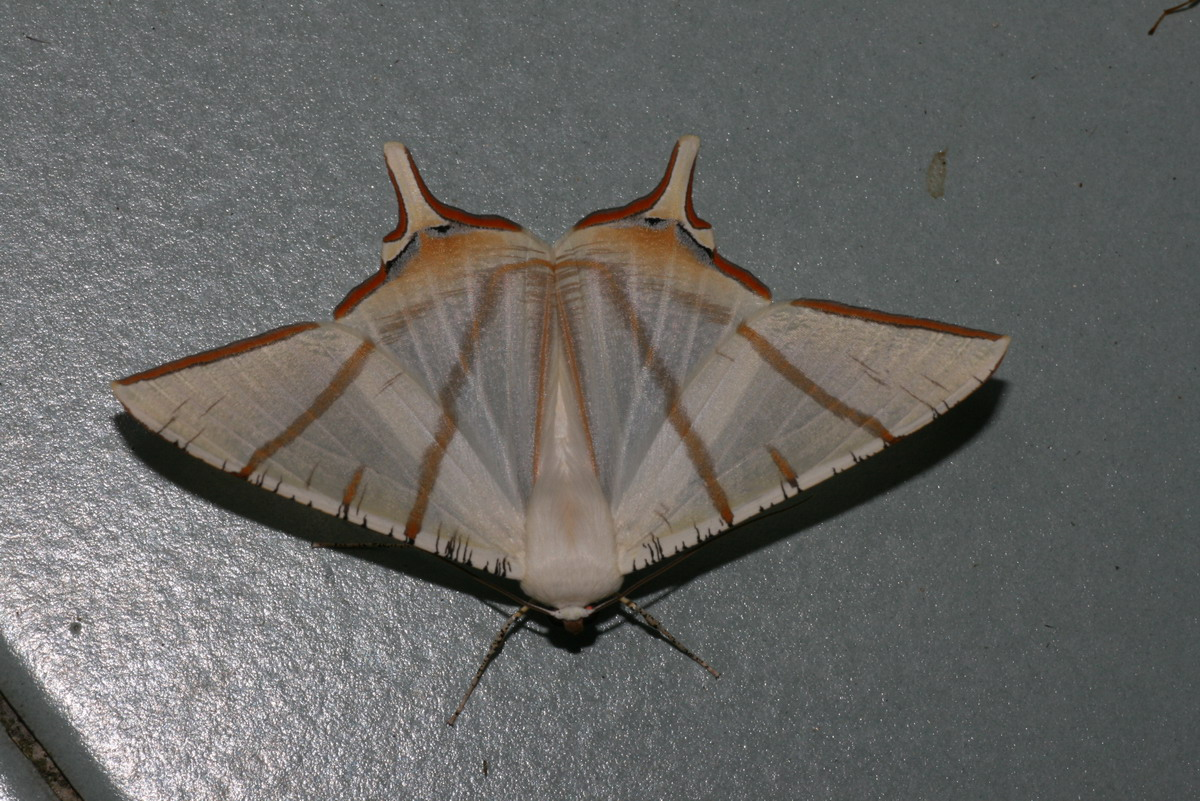

Scientific classification
- Kingdom: Animalia
- Phylum: Arthropoda
- Clade: Pancrustacea
- Class: Insecta
- Order: Lepidoptera
- Family: Geometridae
- Genus: Ourapteryx
- Species: O. claretta

Binomial name
- Ourapteryx claretta Holloway, 1982

= Ourapteryx claretta =

Species of moth

Ourapteryx claretta is a moth of the family Geometridae first described by Jeremy Daniel Holloway in 1982. It is found in Sundaland.
