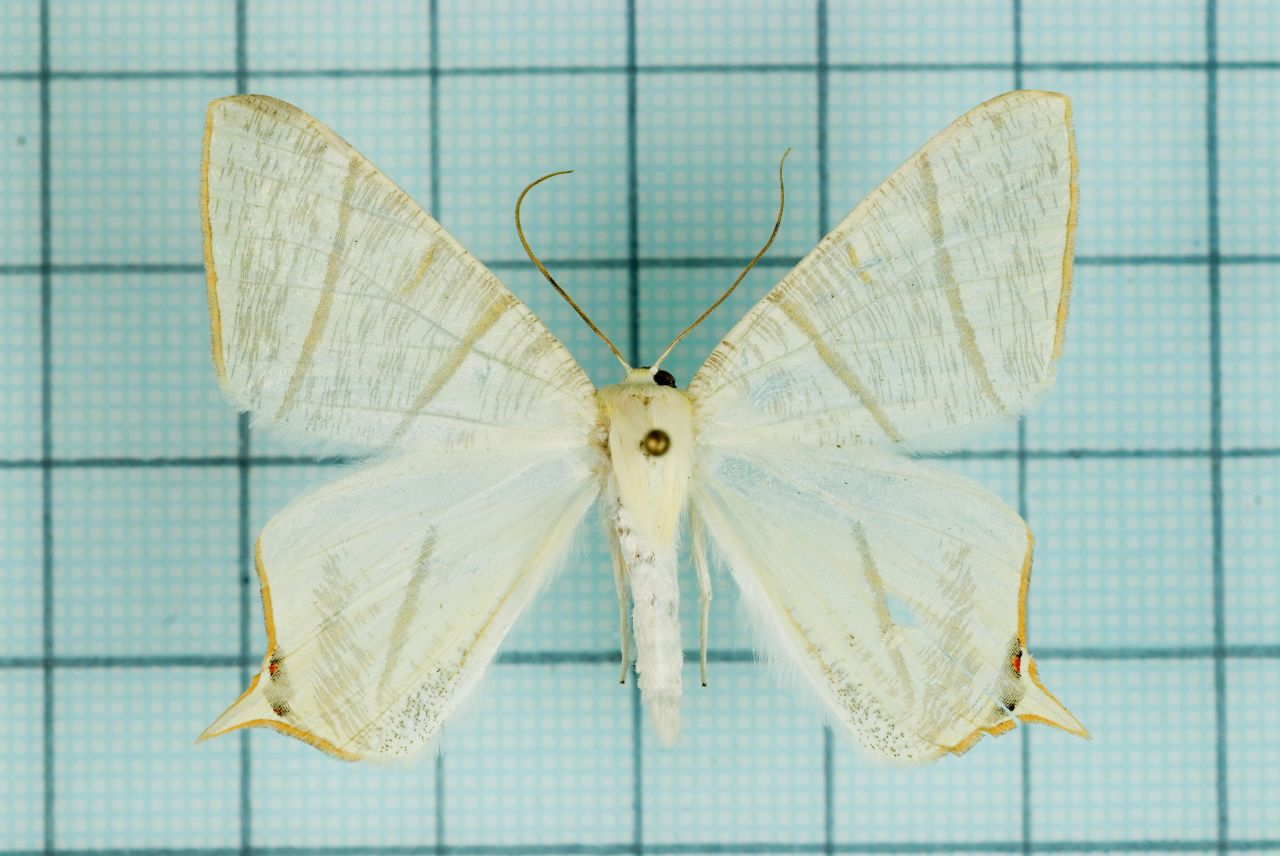

Scientific classification
- Kingdom: Animalia
- Phylum: Arthropoda
- Class: Insecta
- Order: Lepidoptera
- Family: Geometridae
- Genus: Ourapteryx
- Species: O. pallidula

Binomial name
- Ourapteryx pallidula Inoue, 1985

= Ourapteryx pallidula =

Species of moth

Ourapteryx pallidula is a moth belonging to the Geometridae family, first described by Hiroshi Inoue in 1985. It is found in Taiwan.
