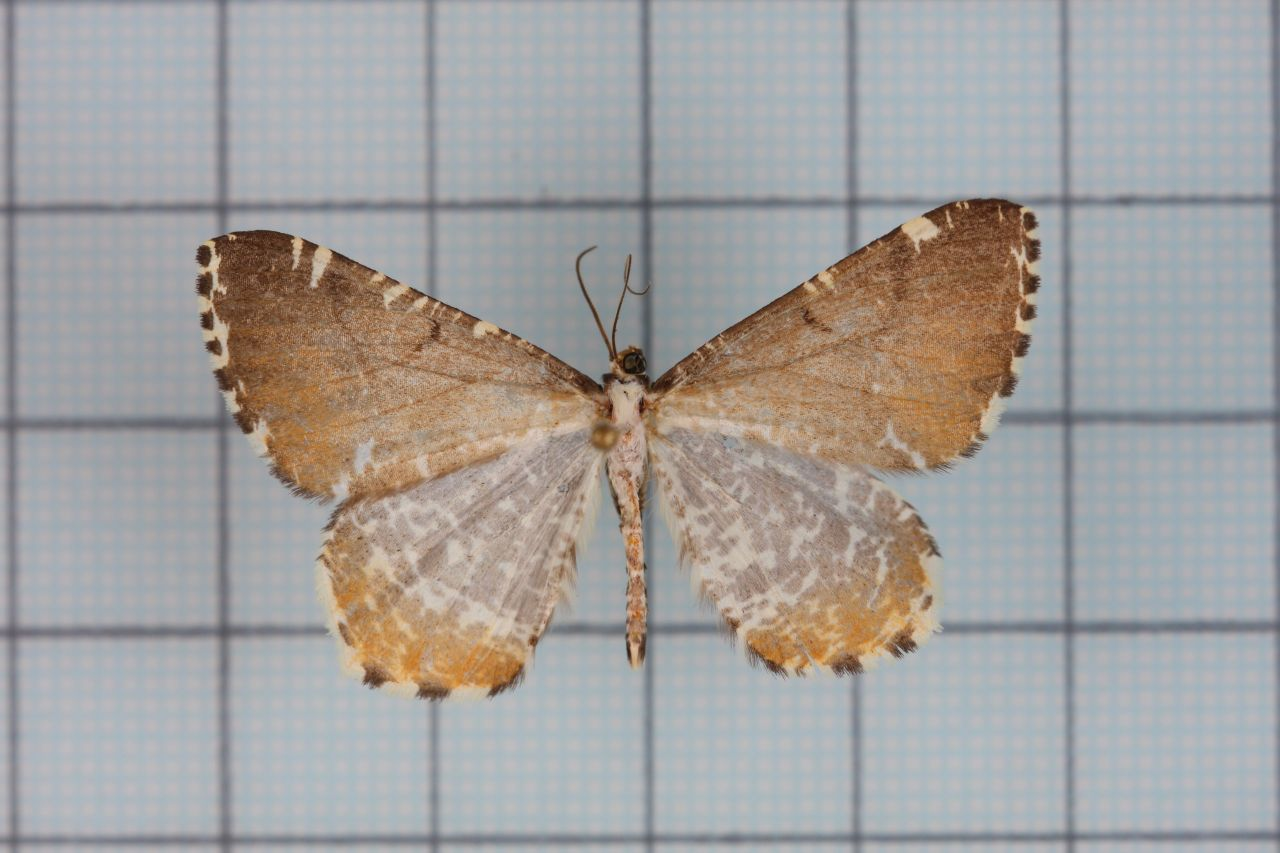

Scientific classification
- Kingdom: Animalia
- Phylum: Arthropoda
- Class: Insecta
- Order: Lepidoptera
- Family: Geometridae
- Genus: Ourapteryx
- Species: O. variolaria

Binomial name
- Ourapteryx variolaria Inoue, 1985

= Ourapteryx variolaria =

Species of moth

Ourapteryx variolaria is a moth of the family Geometridae. It is found in Taiwan.
