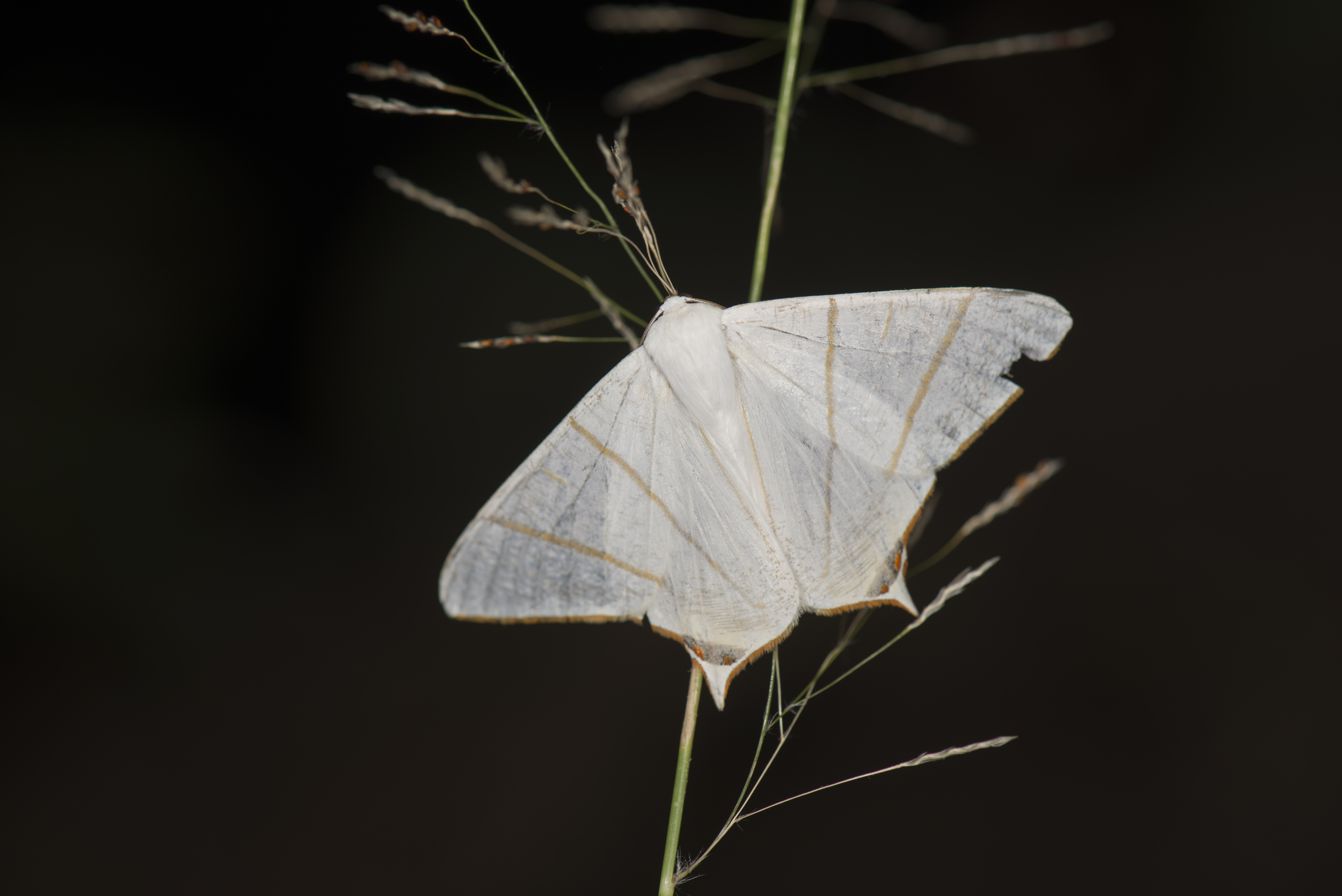
- Ourapteryx changi from Taiwan

Scientific classification
- Domain: Eukaryota
- Kingdom: Animalia
- Phylum: Arthropoda
- Class: Insecta
- Order: Lepidoptera
- Family: Geometridae
- Tribe: Ourapterygini
- Genus: Ourapteryx; Leach, 1814

Synonyms
- List: Lars Hübner, [1806]; Uraptera Billberg, 1820; Acaena Treitschke, 1825; Uropteryx Agassiz, [1847]; Euctenurapteryx Warren, 1894; Energopteryx Thierry-Mieg, 1903; Phrudura Swinhoe, 1906

= Ourapteryx =

Genus of moths

Ourapteryx is a genus of moths in the family Geometridae. The genus was erected by William Elford Leach in 1814.

== Selected species ==
- Ourapteryx caecata (Bastelberger, 1911)
- Ourapteryx changi Inoue, 1985
- Ourapteryx clara Matsumura, 1910
- Ourapteryx claretta Holloway, 1982
- Ourapteryx ebuleata (Guenée, 1858)
- Ourapteryx excellens (Butler, 1889)
- Ourapteryx falciformis Inoue, 1993
- Ourapteryx flavovirens Inoue, 1985
- Ourapteryx fulvinervis (Warren, 1894)
- Ourapteryx incaudata Warren, 1897
- Ourapteryx inspersa Wileman, 1912
- Ourapteryx japonica Inoue, 1993
- Ourapteryx maculicaudaria (Motschulsky, 1866)
- Ourapteryx margaritata (Moore, 1868)
- Ourapteryx marginata (Hampson, 1895)
- Ourapteryx monticola Inoue, 1985
- Ourapteryx multistrigaria Walker, 1866
- Ourapteryx nigrociliaris Inoue, 1985
- Ourapteryx obtusicauda (Warren, 1894)
- Ourapteryx pallidula Inoue, 1985
- Ourapteryx parallelaria (Leech, 1891)
- Ourapteryx peermaadiata Thierry-Mieg, 1903
- Ourapteryx persica (Ménétriés, 1832)
- Ourapteryx picticaudata (Walker, 1860)
- Ourapteryx pluristrigata Warren, 1888)
- Ourapteryx podaliriata (Guenée, 1857)
- Ourapteryx primularis (Butler, 1886)
- Ourapteryx pura (Swinhoe, 1902)
- Ourapteryx purissima Thierry-Meig, 1905
- Ourapteryx ramosa (Wileman, 1910)
- Ourapteryx sambucaria (Linnaeus, 1758)
- Ourapteryx sciticaudaria (Walker, 1862)
- Ourapteryx similaria (Matsumura, 1910)
- Ourapteryx taiwana Wileman, 1910
- Ourapteryx triangularia Moore, 1867
- Ourapteryx ussurica Inoue, 1993
- Ourapteryx variolaria Inoue, 1985
- Ourapteryx venusta Inoue, 1985
- Ourapteryx yerburii Matsumura, 1910
