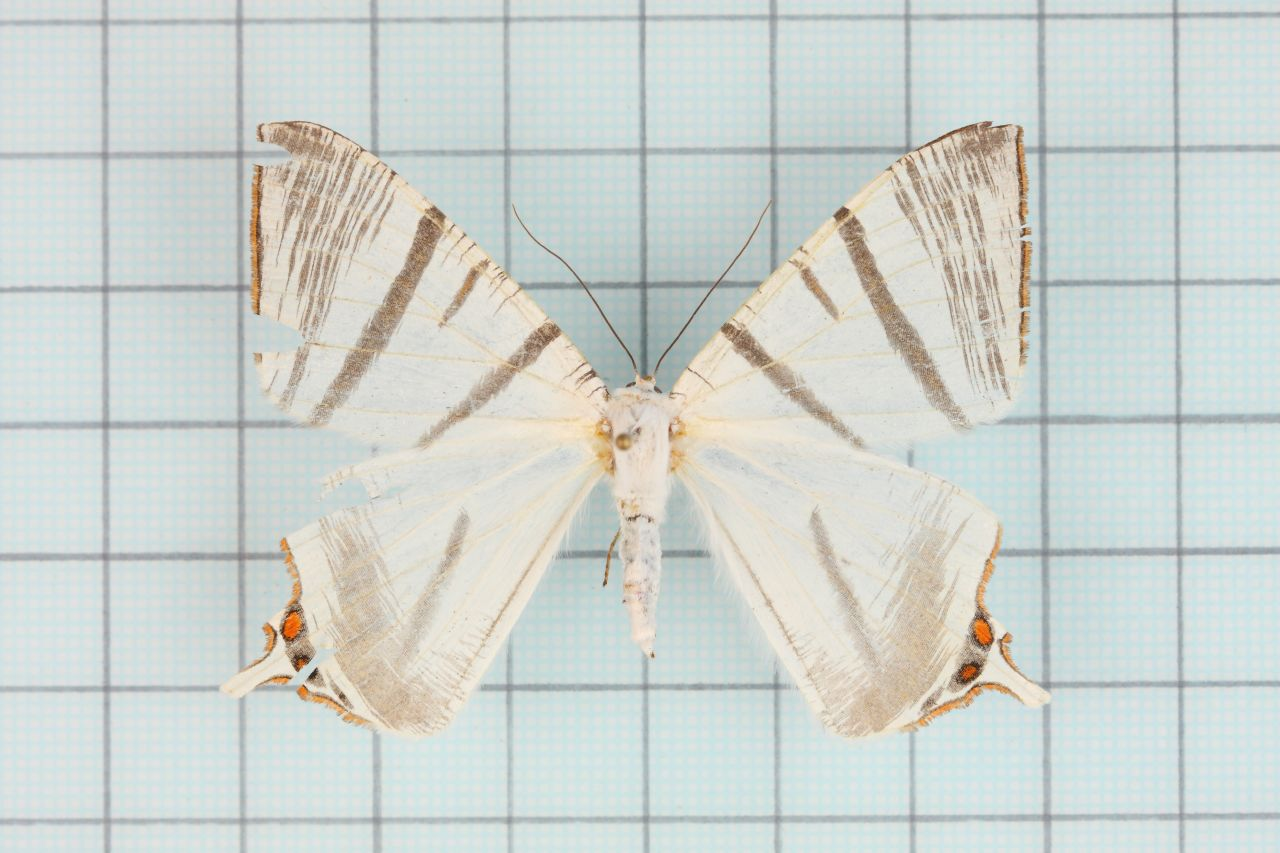
- Female
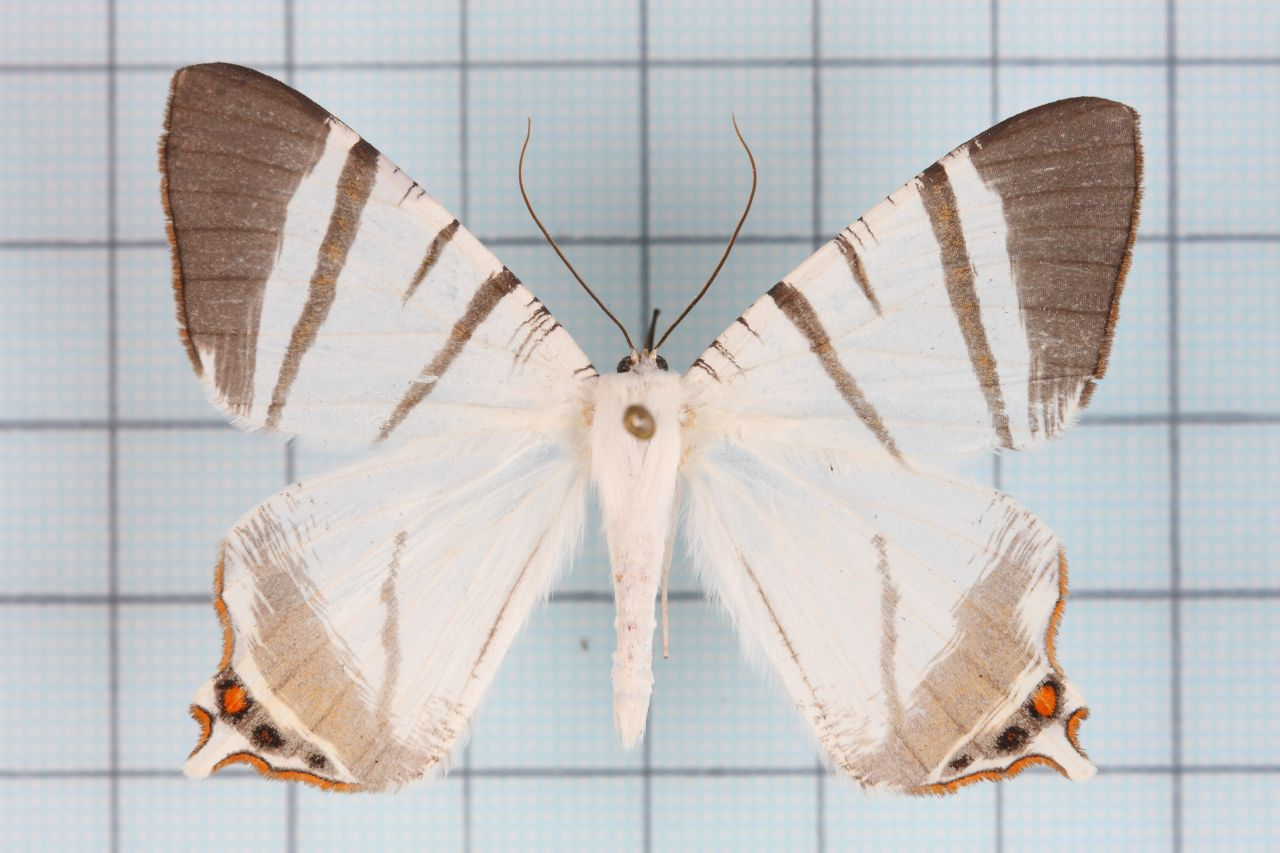
- Male

Scientific classification
- Kingdom: Animalia
- Phylum: Arthropoda
- Class: Insecta
- Order: Lepidoptera
- Family: Geometridae
- Genus: Ourapteryx
- Species: O. taiwana

Binomial name
- Ourapteryx taiwana Wileman, 1910

Synonyms
- Ourapteryx imitans Bastelberger, 1911

= Ourapteryx taiwana =

Species of moth

Ourapteryx taiwana is a moth of the family Geometridae first described by Alfred Ernest Wileman in 1910. It is found in Taiwan.
