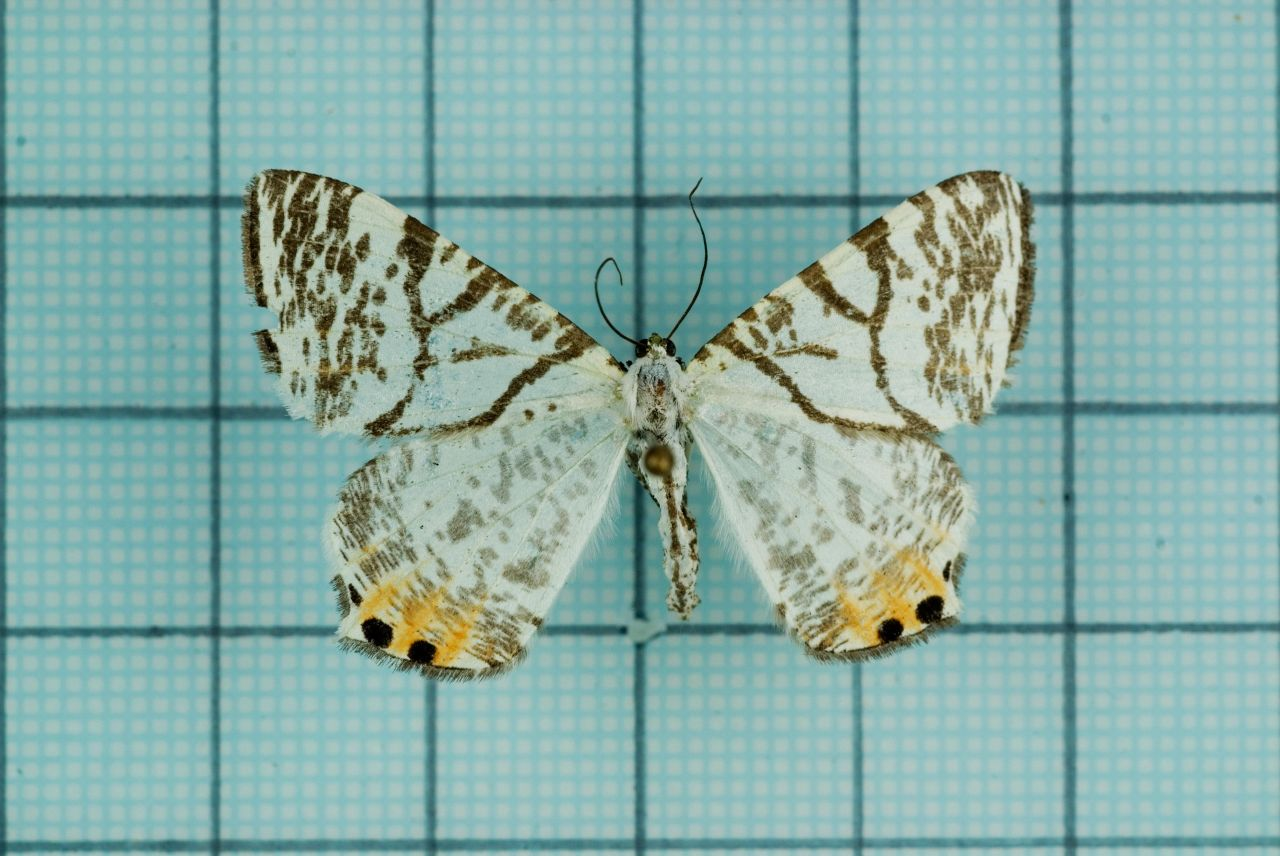
- Female
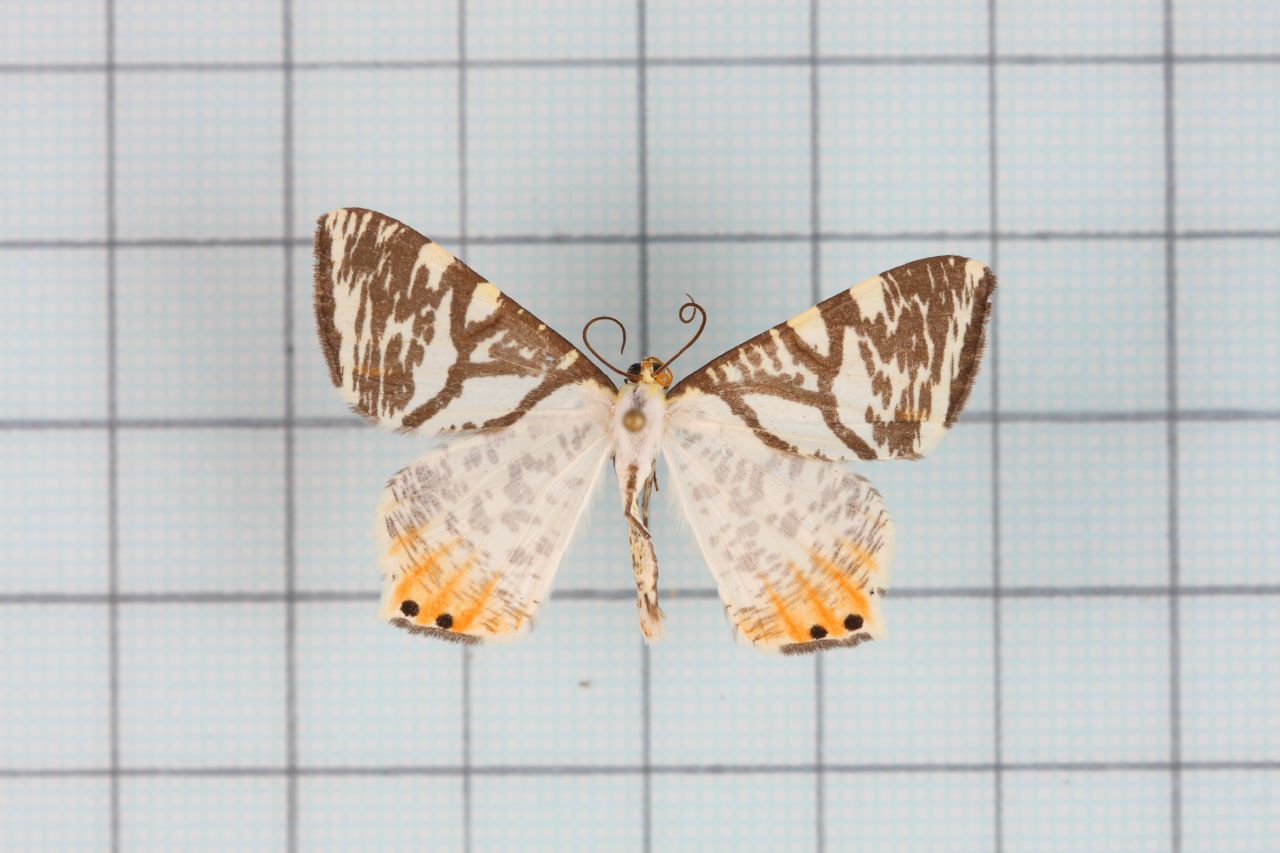
- Male

Scientific classification
- Domain: Eukaryota
- Kingdom: Animalia
- Phylum: Arthropoda
- Class: Insecta
- Order: Lepidoptera
- Family: Geometridae
- Genus: Ourapteryx
- Species: O. ramosa

Binomial name
- Ourapteryx ramosa (Wileman, 1910)

Synonyms
- Tristrophis ramosa Wileman, 1910

= Ourapteryx ramosa =

Species of moth

Ourapteryx ramosa is a moth of the family Geometridae first described by Alfred Ernest Wileman in 1910. It is found in Taiwan.
