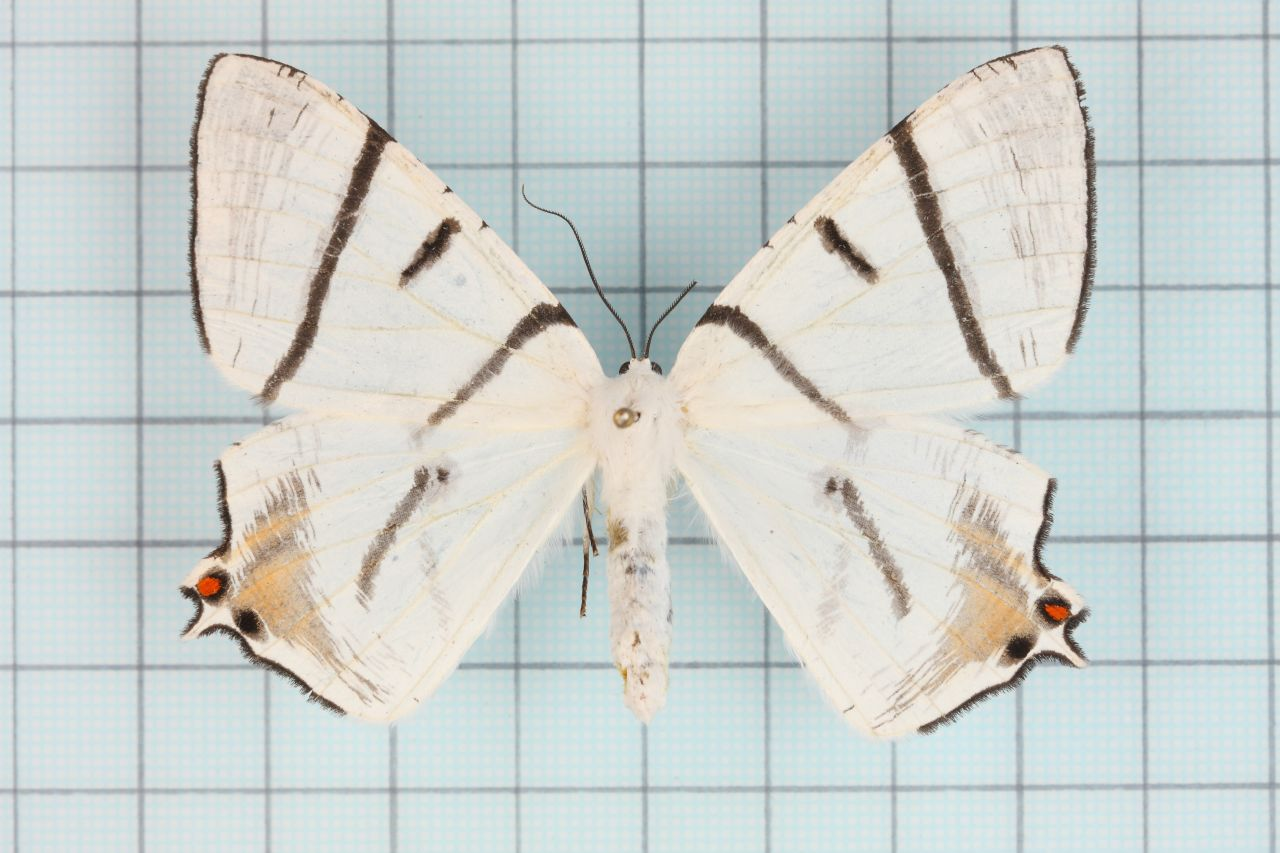
- Ourapteryx nigrociliaris magnifica

Scientific classification
- Domain: Eukaryota
- Kingdom: Animalia
- Phylum: Arthropoda
- Class: Insecta
- Order: Lepidoptera
- Family: Geometridae
- Genus: Ourapteryx
- Species: O. nigrociliaris

Binomial name
- Ourapteryx nigrociliaris (Leech, 1891)

Synonyms
- Urapteryx nigrociliaris Leech, 1891

= Ourapteryx nigrociliaris =

Species of moth

Ourapteryx nigrociliaris is a moth of the family Geometridae first described by John Henry Leech in 1891. It is found in China and Taiwan.

== Subspecies ==
- Ourapteryx nigrociliaris nigrociliaris (China)
- Ourapteryx nigrociliaris magnifica Inoue 1985 (Taiwan)
