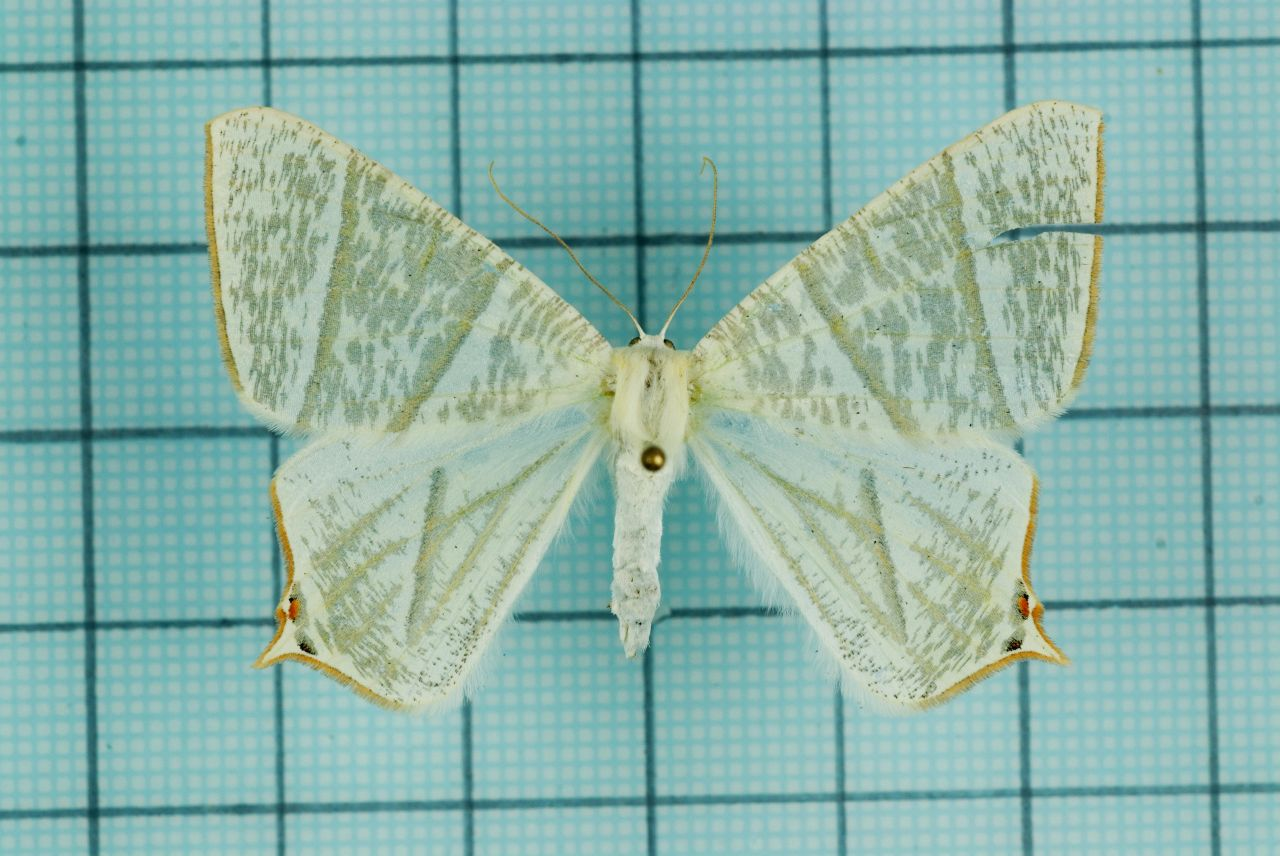

Scientific classification
- Domain: Eukaryota
- Kingdom: Animalia
- Phylum: Arthropoda
- Class: Insecta
- Order: Lepidoptera
- Family: Geometridae
- Genus: Ourapteryx
- Species: O. inspersa

Binomial name
- Ourapteryx inspersa Wileman, 1912

= Ourapteryx inspersa =

Species of moth

Ourapteryx inspersa is a moth of the family Geometridae first described by Alfred Ernest Wileman in 1912. It is found in Taiwan.
