= Abaciscus paucisignata =

Scientific classification
- Domain: Eukaryota
- Kingdom: Animalia
- Phylum: Arthropoda
- Class: Insecta
- Order: Lepidoptera
- Family: Geometridae
- Genus: Abaciscus
- Species: A. paucisignata

Binomial name
- Abaciscus paucisignata (Warren, 1899)

Synonyms
- Alcis paucisignata Warren, 1899; Cymatophora paraphiata Warren, 1900

Species of moth

Abaciscus paucisignata is a species of moth belonging to the family Geometridae. It was described by Warren in 1899. It is known from Peninsular Malaysia and Borneo.

The habitat consists of alluvial forest, lower montane forest and lowland dipterocarp forest.
