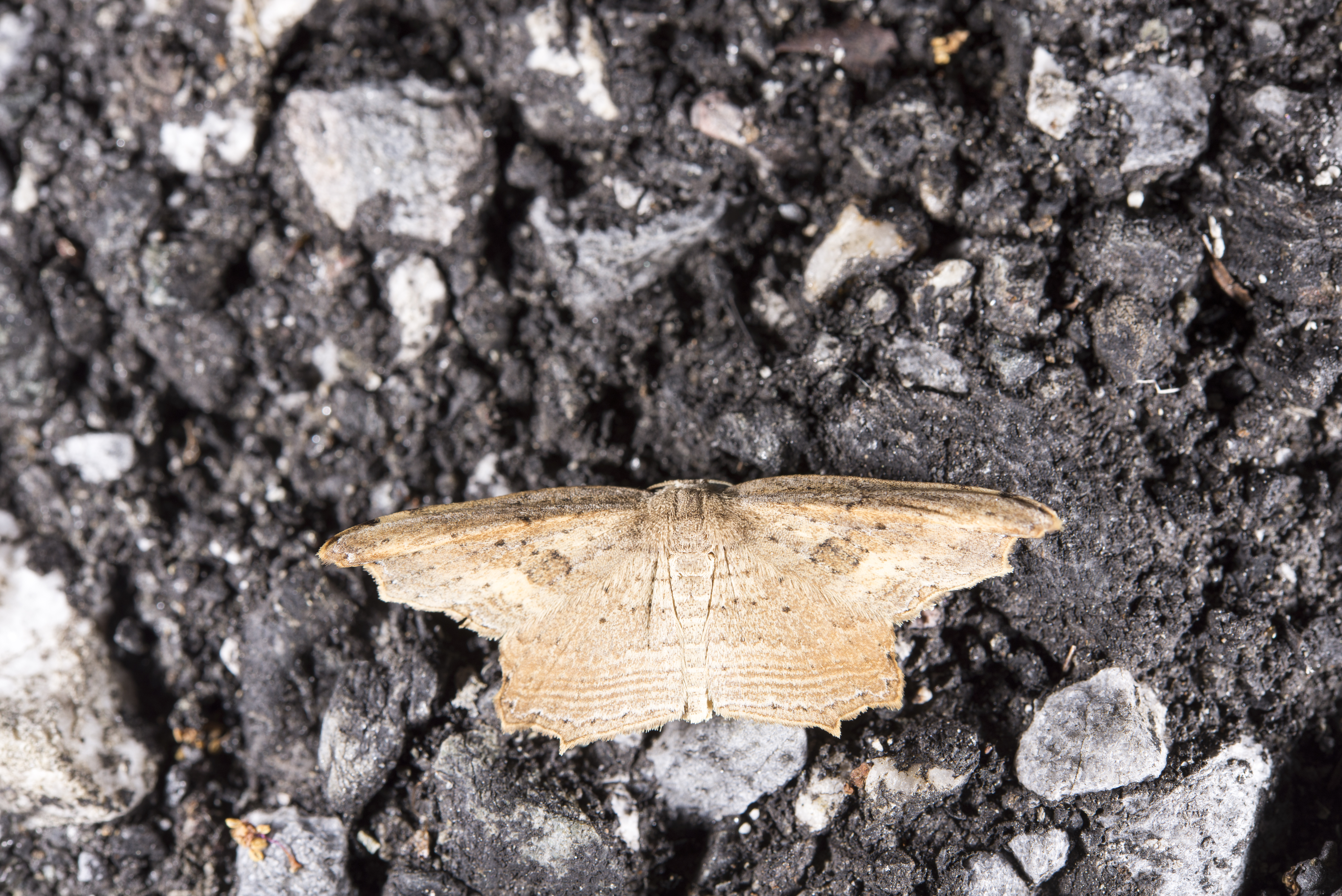
- Phalacra strigata insulicola

Scientific classification
- Domain: Eukaryota
- Kingdom: Animalia
- Phylum: Arthropoda
- Class: Insecta
- Order: Lepidoptera
- Family: Drepanidae
- Genus: Phalacra
- Species: P. strigata

Binomial name
- Phalacra strigata Warren, 1896

Synonyms
- Phalacra multilineata Warren, 1897

= Phalacra strigata =

Species of hook-tip moth

Phalacra strigata is a species of moth of the family Drepanidae first described by Brisbane Charles Somerville Warren in 1896. It is found in India, China and Taiwan.

== Subspecies ==
- Phalacra strigata strigata (northern India, China: Kwangsi, Kwangtung, Szechwan)
- Phalacra strigata insulicola Inoue, 1988 (Taiwan)
