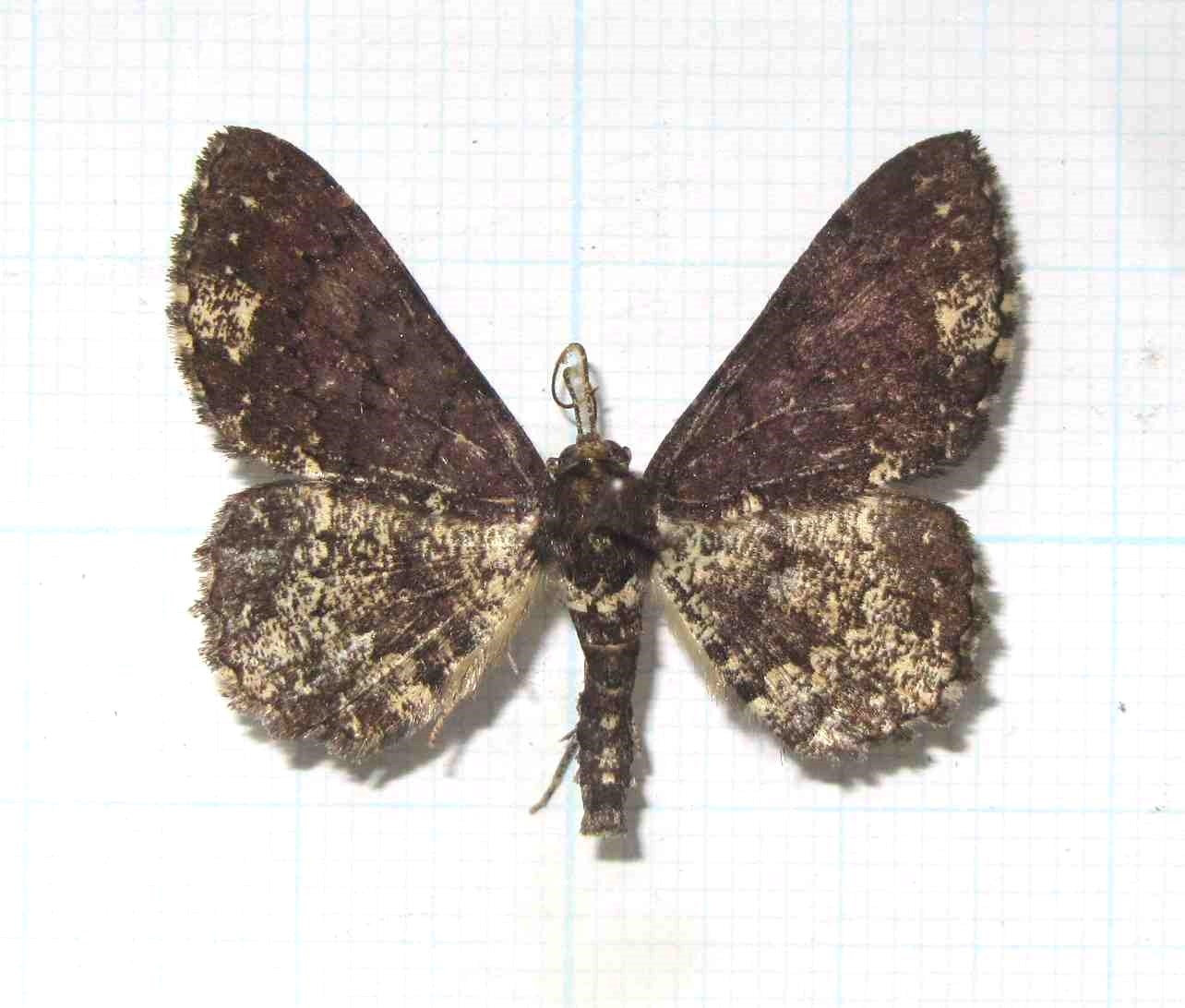

Scientific classification
- Kingdom: Animalia
- Phylum: Arthropoda
- Clade: Pancrustacea
- Class: Insecta
- Order: Lepidoptera
- Family: Geometridae
- Genus: Abaciscus
- Species: A. tristis

Binomial name
- Abaciscus tristis Butler, 1889

= Abaciscus tristis =

Species of moth

Abaciscus tristis is a species of moth belonging to the family Geometridae, and the type species of the genus Abaciscus. It was described by Arthur Gardiner Butler in 1889. It is known from the Himalaya, western and southern China, Taiwan and Borneo.

It is infrequent in upper montane forest, ranging from 1,000 to 2,000 meters.
