= Abaciscus stellifera =

Scientific classification
- Domain: Eukaryota
- Kingdom: Animalia
- Phylum: Arthropoda
- Class: Insecta
- Order: Lepidoptera
- Family: Geometridae
- Genus: Abaciscus
- Species: A. stellifera

Binomial name
- Abaciscus stellifera (Warren, 1896)

Synonyms
- Enantiodes stellifera Warren, 1896

Species of moth

Abaciscus stellifera is a species of moth belonging to the family Geometridae. It was described by entomologist William Warren (entomologist) in 1896, originally under the name Enantiodes stellifera. It is known from the north-eastern Himalaya.
