= Phalacra albilinea =

Scientific classification
- Domain: Eukaryota
- Kingdom: Animalia
- Phylum: Arthropoda
- Class: Insecta
- Order: Lepidoptera
- Family: Drepanidae
- Genus: Phalacra
- Species: P. albilinea

Binomial name
- Phalacra albilinea Warren, 1899

Species of hook-tip moth

Phalacra albilinea is a moth in the family Drepanidae. It was described by Warren in 1899. It is found in India.

The wingspan is about 39 mm (1.5 in). The forewings are pale wood colour, finely black speckled. The lines are indistinct, consisting of a double dark line near the base, angled at the midwing. At about two-fifths and three-fifths of the costa arise two grey irregularly dentate-crenulate lines, vertical in direction to the median vein, then oblique and approximating the inner margin at one-third. The space between them is pale yellowish ochreous and the space immediately preceding and following, as well as a subcostal streak, are brownish ochreous. At five-sixths of the costa is a double lunulate line vertical to vein 4, then sharply oblique to the inner margin at two-fifths. It is clear white with fine black edges joined by black dashes at the veins. There is a strongly dentate submarginal line, the teeth outwardly marked in black. There is also an oblique grey cloud below the apex from the hindmargin to the outer line. The marginal line is fine and grey. The hindwings are paler, the pale central fascia as in the forewings, but equally wide throughout, preceded by a subbasal brownish ochreous band, internally dark edged, and followed by a brownish lunulate line. The outer line is black, straight, slightly lunulate below the costa and preceded by a brownish lunulate line. The submarginal and marginal areas are as in the forewings and there are two black dots on the discocellular.
