= Abaciscus intractabilis =

Scientific classification
- Kingdom: Animalia
- Phylum: Arthropoda
- Class: Insecta
- Order: Lepidoptera
- Family: Geometridae
- Genus: Abaciscus
- Species: A. intractabilis

Binomial name
- Abaciscus intractabilis (Walker, 1864)

Synonyms
- Homoptera intractabilis Walker, 1864

Species of moth

Abaciscus intractabilis is a species of moth belonging to the family Geometridae. It was described by Francis Walker in 1864. It is known from Borneo, Peninsular Malaysia and Sumatra.

Its wings are a dark black with dull yellow flecks and dots. The species is nocturnal.
