= Abaciscus lutosus =

Scientific classification
- Kingdom: Animalia
- Phylum: Arthropoda
- Clade: Pancrustacea
- Class: Insecta
- Order: Lepidoptera
- Family: Geometridae
- Genus: Abaciscus
- Species: A. lutosus

Binomial name
- Abaciscus lutosus Holloway, 1993

Species of moth

Abaciscus lutosus is a species of moth belonging to the family Geometridae. It was described by Jeremy Daniel Holloway in 1993. It is known from Borneo.

The wingspan is about 16 mm. Adults were found in lower montane forest and lowland forest.
