= Phalacra vidhisara =

Scientific classification
- Kingdom: Animalia
- Phylum: Arthropoda
- Class: Insecta
- Order: Lepidoptera
- Family: Drepanidae
- Genus: Phalacra
- Species: P. vidhisara

Binomial name
- Phalacra vidhisara (Walker, 1860)

Synonyms
- Hemerophila vidhisara Walker, 1860; Phalacra metagonaria Walker, 1866

Species of hook-tip moth

Phalacra vidhisara is a moth in the family Drepanidae. It was described by Francis Walker in 1860. It is found in Sri Lanka and India.

== Description ==
The wings with the outer margins not excised below the apices. Body pale reddish brown, sparsely irrorated with black scales. Forewings with traces of an antemedial waved black line. Postmedial and submarginal series of black specks. Hindwing with an indistinct sub-basal line. A double medial line and post-medial and sub-marginal series of black specks. Cilia of both wings traversed by a black line. Larva fusiform, where the head is broad. Lateral and dorsal setae and prolonged anal setaceous spines. Body greenish with a dorsal pink band laterally bordered by yellow and two red lines. Pupa purplish brown. Pupa covered with white bloom.
