= Abaciscus kathmandensis =

Scientific classification
- Domain: Eukaryota
- Kingdom: Animalia
- Phylum: Arthropoda
- Class: Insecta
- Order: Lepidoptera
- Family: Geometridae
- Genus: Abaciscus
- Species: A. kathmandensis

Binomial name
- Abaciscus kathmandensis Sato, 1993

Species of moth

Abaciscus kathmandensis is a species of moth belonging to the family Geometridae. It was described by Sato in 1993.
