= Phalacra columba =

Scientific classification
- Kingdom: Animalia
- Phylum: Arthropoda
- Clade: Pancrustacea
- Class: Insecta
- Order: Lepidoptera
- Family: Drepanidae
- Genus: Phalacra
- Species: P. columba

Binomial name
- Phalacra columba Holloway, 1998

Species of hook-tip moth

Phalacra columba is a moth in the family Drepanidae. It was described by Jeremy Daniel Holloway in 1998. It is found on Peninsular Malaysia, Borneo and Sumatra.
