= Phalacra rufa =

Scientific classification
- Kingdom: Animalia
- Phylum: Arthropoda
- Class: Insecta
- Order: Lepidoptera
- Family: Drepanidae
- Genus: Phalacra
- Species: P. rufa

Binomial name
- Phalacra rufa Hampson, 1910

Species of hook-tip moth

Phalacra rufa is a moth in the family Drepanidae. It was described by George Hampson in 1910. It is found in Sri Lanka.
