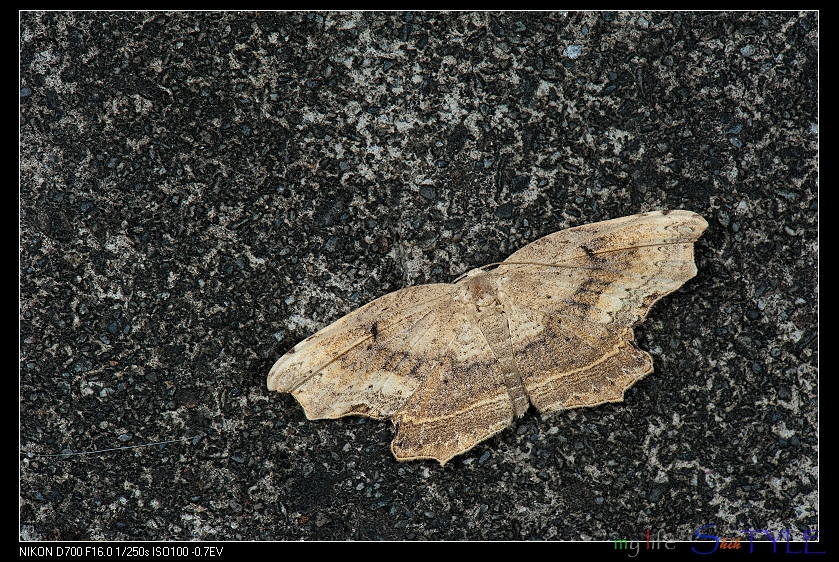

Scientific classification
- Domain: Eukaryota
- Kingdom: Animalia
- Phylum: Arthropoda
- Class: Insecta
- Order: Lepidoptera
- Family: Drepanidae
- Genus: Phalacra
- Species: P. kagiensis

Binomial name
- Phalacra kagiensis Wileman, 1916

= Phalacra kagiensis =

Species of hook-tip moth

Phalacra kagiensis is a moth in the family Drepanidae. It was described by Wileman in 1916. It is found in Taiwan.
