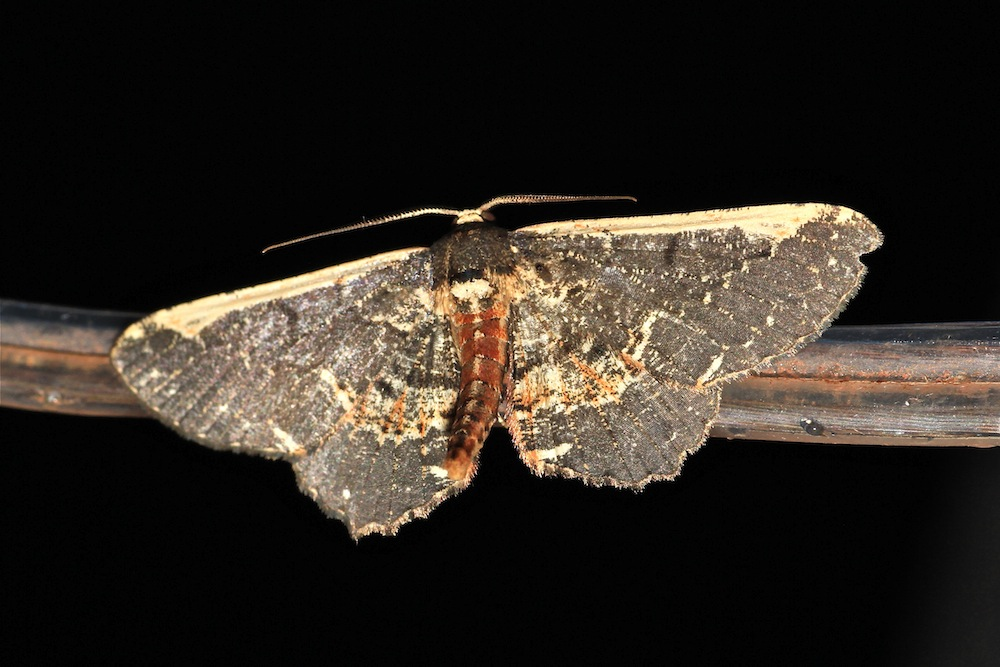
- Abaciscus costimacula

Scientific classification
- Kingdom: Animalia
- Phylum: Arthropoda
- Class: Insecta
- Order: Lepidoptera
- Family: Geometridae
- Subfamily: Ennominae
- Tribe: Boarmiini
- Genus: Abaciscus

Synonyms
- Enantiodes Warren, 1896; Prionostrenia Wehrli, 1939

= Abaciscus (moth) =

Genus of geometer moths

Abaciscus is a genus of moths in the family Geometridae.

== Species ==
- Abaciscus atmala (Swinhoe, 1894)
- Abaciscus costimacula (Wileman, 1912)
- Abaciscus figlina Swinhoe
- Abaciscus intractabilis (Walker, 1864)
- Abaciscus kathmandensis Sato, 1993
- Abaciscus lutosus Holloway, 1993
- Abaciscus paucisignata (Warren, 1899)
- Abaciscus shaneae Holloway, 1993
- Abaciscus stellifera (Warren, 1896)
- Abaciscus tristis Butler, 1889
