= Abaciscus shaneae =

Scientific classification
- Kingdom: Animalia
- Phylum: Arthropoda
- Clade: Pancrustacea
- Class: Insecta
- Order: Lepidoptera
- Family: Geometridae
- Genus: Abaciscus
- Species: A. shaneae

Binomial name
- Abaciscus shaneae Holloway, 1993

Species of moth

Abaciscus shaneae is a species of moth belonging to the family Geometridae. It was described by Jeremy Daniel Holloway in 1993. It is known from Borneo.

The wingspan is about 17 mm.
