= Phalacra acutipennis =

Scientific classification
- Domain: Eukaryota
- Kingdom: Animalia
- Phylum: Arthropoda
- Class: Insecta
- Order: Lepidoptera
- Family: Drepanidae
- Genus: Phalacra
- Species: P. acutipennis

Binomial name
- Phalacra acutipennis Swinhoe, 1903

Species of hook-tip moth

Phalacra acutipennis is a moth in the family Drepanidae. It was described by Charles Swinhoe in 1903. It is found in the Khasi Hills of India.

The wings are greyish ochreous, with a pinkish tinge and irrorated (sprinkled) with minute brown dots. There is a black spot on the middle of the discoidal vein and another at its lower end on all the wings. The forewings have suffused brown basal, medial and marginal bands. The middle band running only a short distance from the hindmargin, leaving the upper disc and spaces between the bands pale. The hindwings are suffused with brown and have six short lines at the base.
