= Phalacra ochrea =

Scientific classification
- Domain: Eukaryota
- Kingdom: Animalia
- Phylum: Arthropoda
- Class: Insecta
- Order: Lepidoptera
- Family: Drepanidae
- Genus: Phalacra
- Species: P. ochrea

Binomial name
- Phalacra ochrea Warren, 1922

Species of hook-tip moth

Phalacra ochrea is a moth in the family Drepanidae. It was described by Warren in 1922. It is found in India.
