= Phalacra excisa =

Scientific classification
- Kingdom: Animalia
- Phylum: Arthropoda
- Class: Insecta
- Order: Lepidoptera
- Family: Drepanidae
- Genus: Phalacra
- Species: P. excisa

Binomial name
- Phalacra excisa Hampson, 1892

Species of hook-tip moth

Phalacra excisa is a moth in the family Drepanidae. It was described by George Hampson in 1892. It is found in Sikkim, India.

The wingspan is about 36 mm. Adults are grey brown, the forewings with the outer margin excised below the apex and angled at vein 4. There are traces of numerous waved lines and there is a black spot in the cell, as well as a pale postmedial band with waved edges. There is also a dark speck on the costa before the apex. The hindwings are paler, with the lines nearly straight. There are two antemedial, four postmedial and one submarginal line and the outer margin is excised between the apex and the much-produced angle at vein 6.
