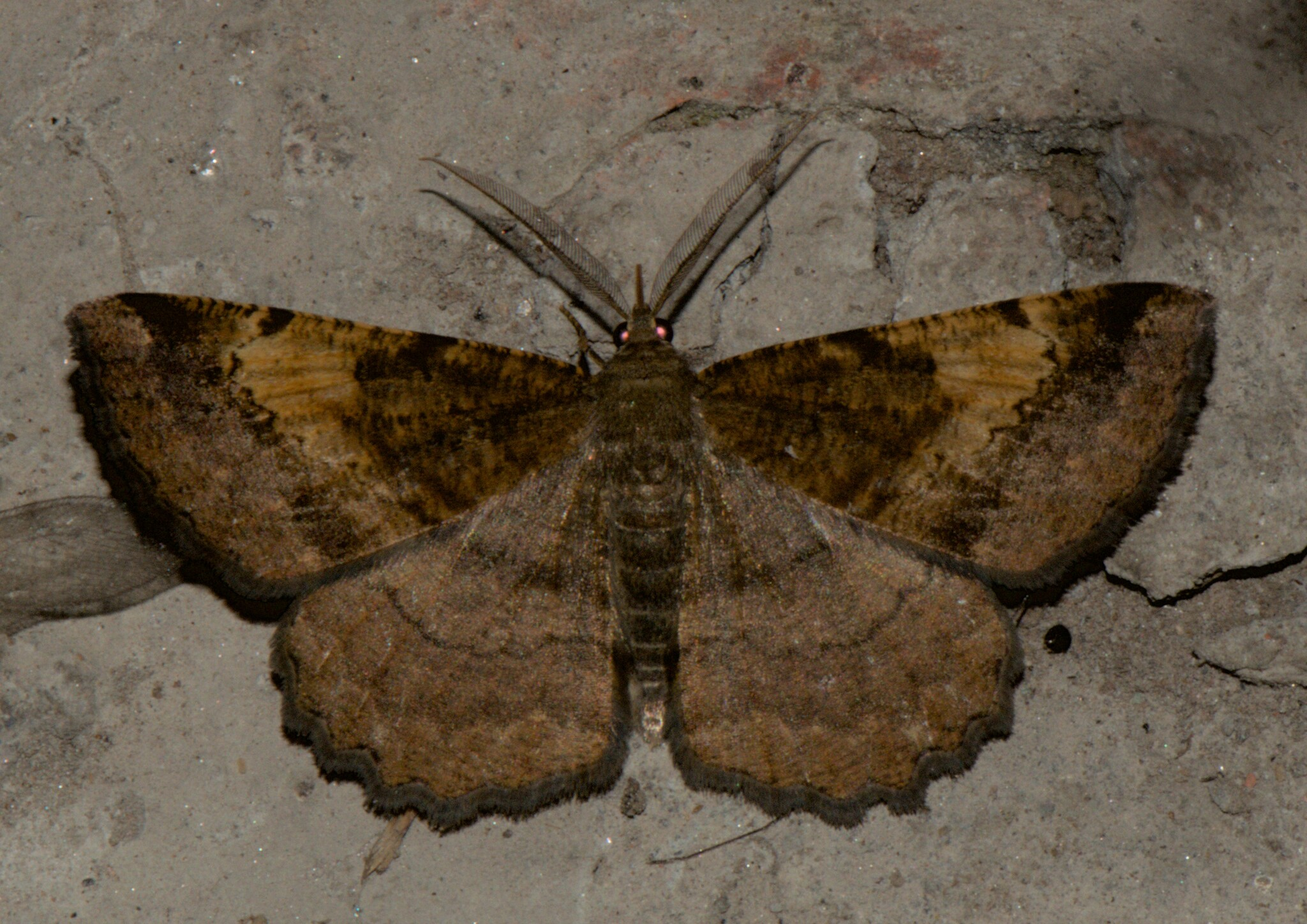

Scientific classification
- Domain: Eukaryota
- Kingdom: Animalia
- Phylum: Arthropoda
- Class: Insecta
- Order: Lepidoptera
- Family: Geometridae
- Genus: Abaciscus
- Species: A. atmala

Binomial name
- Abaciscus atmala (C. Swinhoe, 1894)

Synonyms
- Tephrina atmala C. Swinhoe, 1894; Azata subcinerea Warren, 1896

= Abaciscus atmala =

Species of moth

Abaciscus atmala is a species of moth belonging to the family Geometridae. It was described by Charles Swinhoe in 1894. It is native to the north-eastern Himalayas, Myanmar, Siberut Island and Borneo.

The wingspan is 12–14 mm.

== Subspecies ==
- Abaciscus atmala atmala (Himalayas, Myanmar)
- Abaciscus atmala smedleyi (L. B. Prout, 1931) (Siberut Island)
- Abaciscus atmala flavida Holloway, 1993 (Borneo)
