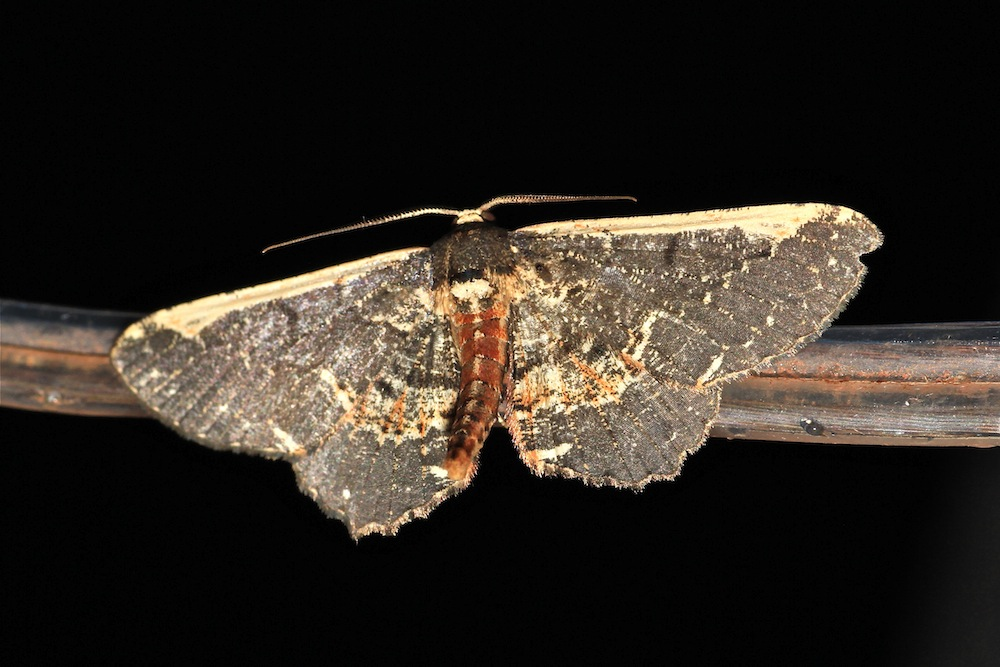
- Bornean specimen from mixed dipterocarp forest

Scientific classification
- Kingdom: Animalia
- Phylum: Arthropoda
- Clade: Pancrustacea
- Class: Insecta
- Order: Lepidoptera
- Family: Geometridae
- Genus: Abaciscus
- Species: A. costimacula

Binomial name
- Abaciscus costimacula (Wileman, 1912)

Synonyms
- Alcis costimacula Wileman, 1912; Ectropis costimacula adjuncta Prout, 1928; Proteostrenia ochrimacula var. ochrispila Wehrli, 1936; Prionostrenia ochrimacula ochrispila Wehrli, 1939

= Abaciscus costimacula =

Species of moth

Abaciscus costimacula is a species of moth belonging to the family Geometridae. It was described by Alfred Ernest Wileman in 1912. It is known from Taiwan, China, Sumatra, Peninsular Malaysia and Borneo.
