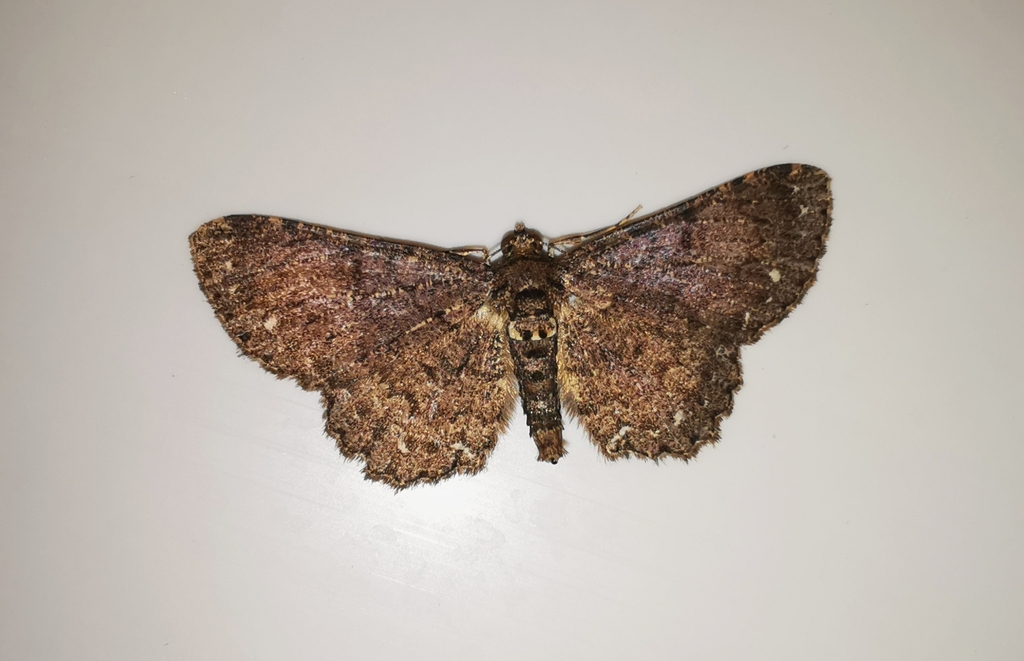

Scientific classification
- Domain: Eukaryota
- Kingdom: Animalia
- Phylum: Arthropoda
- Class: Insecta
- Order: Lepidoptera
- Family: Geometridae
- Genus: Abaciscus
- Species: A. figlina

Binomial name
- Abaciscus figlina C. Swinhoe, 1890

= Abaciscus figlina =

Species of moth

Abaciscus figlina is a species of moth belonging to the family Geometridae. It was described by Charles Swinhoe in 1890. It is known from the Himalayas and Myanmar.
