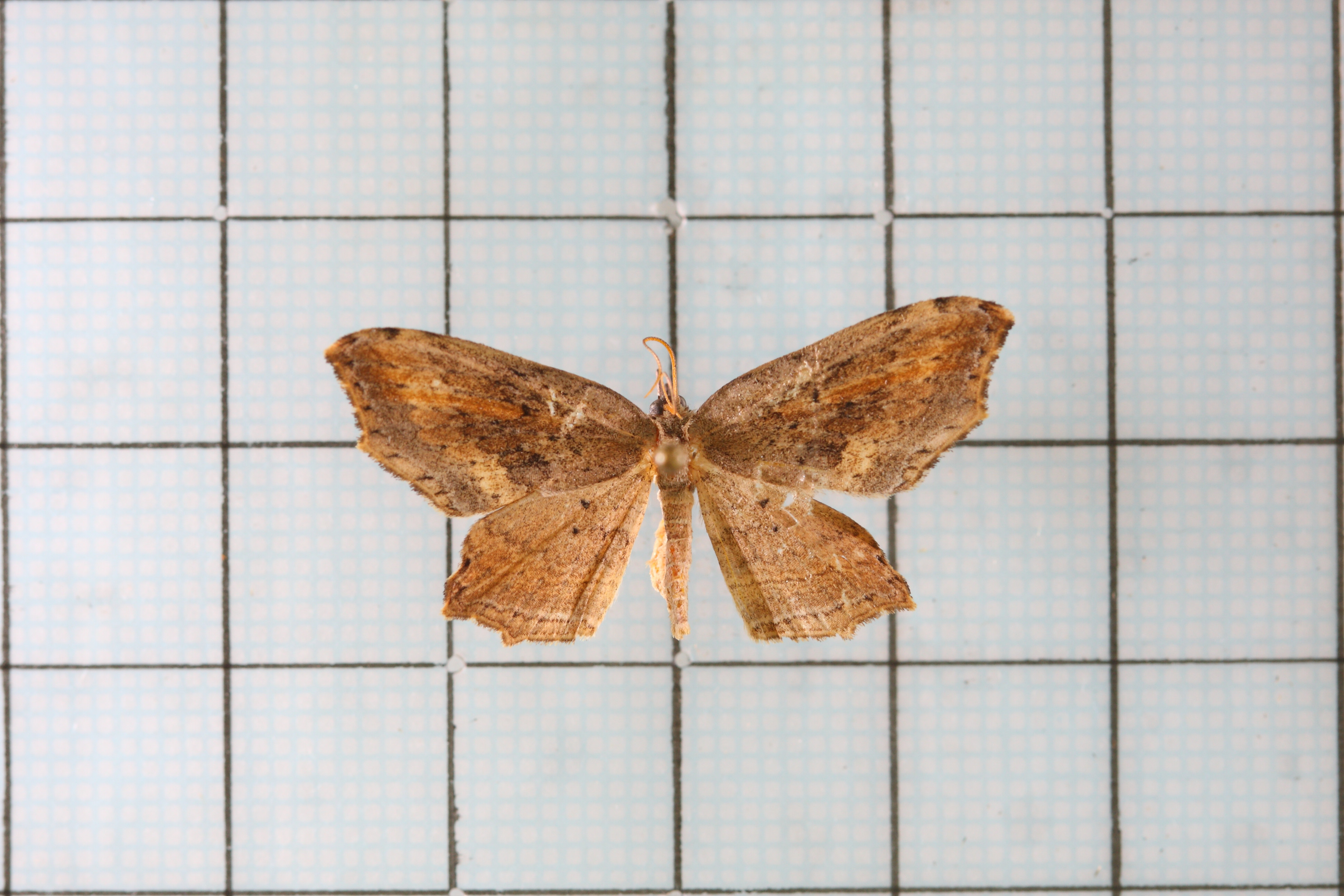
- Phalacra strigata

Scientific classification
- Domain: Eukaryota
- Kingdom: Animalia
- Phylum: Arthropoda
- Class: Insecta
- Order: Lepidoptera
- Family: Drepanidae
- Subfamily: Drepaninae
- Genus: Phalacra; Walker, 1866

= Phalacra =

Moth genus in family Drepanidae

Phalacra is a genus of moths belonging to the subfamily Drepaninae. The genus was erected by Francis Walker in 1866.

== Species ==
- Phalacra acutipennis Swinhoe, 1903
- Phalacra buchsbaumi Holloway, 1998
- Phalacra columba Holloway, 1998
- Phalacra kagiensis Wileman, 1916
- Phalacra strigata Warren, 1896
- Phalacra vidhisara (Walker, 1860)
- Phalacra excisa Hampson, 1892
- Phalacra ochrea Warren, 1922
- Phalacra rufa Hampson, 1910
- Phalacra albilinea Warren, 1899
- Phalacra nigrilineata Warren, 1922
- Phalacra perspicaria (Fabricius, 1798)

== Former species ==
- Phalacra metagonaria Walker, 1866
- Phalacra multilineata Warren, 1897
