= Phalacra perspicaria =

Scientific classification
- Domain: Eukaryota
- Kingdom: Animalia
- Phylum: Arthropoda
- Class: Insecta
- Order: Lepidoptera
- Family: Drepanidae
- Genus: Phalacra
- Species: P. perspicaria

Binomial name
- Phalacra perspicaria (Fabricius, 1798)

Synonyms
- Phalaena perspicaria Fabricius, 1798

Species of hook-tip moth

Phalacra perspicaria is a moth in the family Drepanidae. It was described by Johan Christian Fabricius in 1798. It is found in India.

The protologue (species description) of Phalaena perspicaria by Fabricius is in Entomologia systematica emandata et aucta. Supplementum Entomologiae Systematicae 1798; page 449, where it says (in Latin):

P. pectinicornis alis angulatis obscure cinereis: puncto medio strigisque duabus punctorum nigrorum. Habitat Tranquebariae Dom. Lund. Paullo maior Ph. tristriariae, tota obscure cinerea. Alae omnes supra puncto medio strigisque duabus posticis a punctis minutis, atris. Subtus pallidiores puncto medio strigisque unica atris.

At the Global Lepidoptera Names Index, P. perspicaria is suspected to be a senior synonym of Phalacra vidhisaria Walker; in that case the name perspicaria is older and has a preference.

The type location is the town of Tharangambadi on the Coromandel Coast of Tamil Nadu, India.
