= Brisbane Charles Somerville Warren =

Irish lepidopterist

Brisbane Charles Somerville Warren (1887, Fermoy - 1979) was an Irish entomologist who specialised in Palaearctic Lepidoptera.

Warren lived in Ireland, England, Germany and Switzerland. After 1934 he settled permanently in Folkestone. Between 1902 and 1960 he amassed an extensive collection of Palaearctic Lepidoptera now in the Natural History Museum, London. He published 112 scientific papers, but he is best known for his Monograph on the genus Erebia (1936). He was a Fellow of the Royal Entomological Society of London and a member of Societas Europaea Lepidopterologica.
