= Calluga crassitibia =

Scientific classification
- Kingdom: Animalia
- Phylum: Arthropoda
- Clade: Pancrustacea
- Class: Insecta
- Order: Lepidoptera
- Family: Geometridae
- Genus: Calluga
- Species: C. crassitibia

Binomial name
- Calluga crassitibia (Warren, 1901)

Synonyms
- Micrulia crassitibia Warren, 1901

Species of moth

Calluga crassitibia is a moth in the family Geometridae. It is found on Dammer Island (the Maluku Islands).
