= Calluga semirasata =

Scientific classification
- Kingdom: Animalia
- Phylum: Arthropoda
- Class: Insecta
- Order: Lepidoptera
- Family: Geometridae
- Genus: Calluga
- Species: C. semirasata

Binomial name
- Calluga semirasata (Warren, 1903)

Synonyms
- Chloroclystis semirasata Warren, 1903

Species of moth

Calluga semirasata is a moth in the family Geometridae. It is found in New Guinea.
