= Calluga variotincta =

Scientific classification
- Kingdom: Animalia
- Phylum: Arthropoda
- Class: Insecta
- Order: Lepidoptera
- Family: Geometridae
- Genus: Calluga
- Species: C. variotincta

Binomial name
- Calluga variotincta (Warren, 1907)

Synonyms
- Aniserpetes variotincta Warren, 1907

Species of moth

Calluga variotincta is a moth in the family Geometridae.
