= Calluga miantosoma =

Scientific classification
- Domain: Eukaryota
- Kingdom: Animalia
- Phylum: Arthropoda
- Class: Insecta
- Order: Lepidoptera
- Family: Geometridae
- Genus: Calluga
- Species: C. miantosoma

Binomial name
- Calluga miantosoma (Warren, 1907)

Synonyms
- Chloroclystis miantosoma Warren, 1907

Species of moth

Calluga miantosoma is a moth in the family Geometridae.
