= Calluga grammophora =

Scientific classification
- Kingdom: Animalia
- Phylum: Arthropoda
- Clade: Pancrustacea
- Class: Insecta
- Order: Lepidoptera
- Family: Geometridae
- Genus: Calluga
- Species: C. grammophora

Binomial name
- Calluga grammophora Prout, 1958

Species of moth

Calluga grammophora is a moth in the family Geometridae. It is found in New Guinea.
