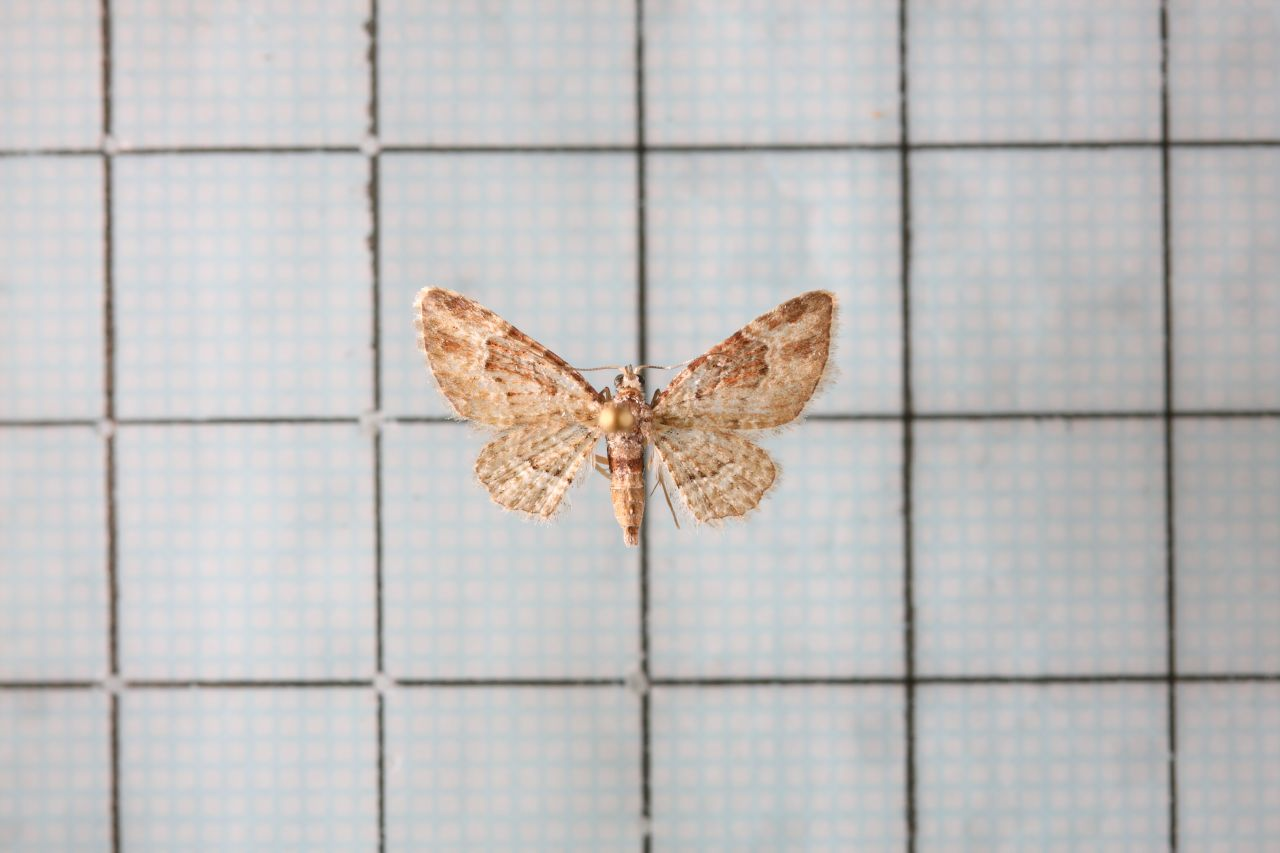
- Calluga costalis

Scientific classification
- Kingdom: Animalia
- Phylum: Arthropoda
- Class: Insecta
- Order: Lepidoptera
- Family: Geometridae
- Tribe: Eupitheciini
- Genus: Calluga; Moore, 1887

Synonyms
- Aniserpetes Warren, 1903; Sillophora Warren, 1907

= Calluga =

Genus of moths

Calluga is a genus of moths in the family Geometridae.

== Species ==
- Calluga cissocosma (Turner, 1904)
- Calluga costalis (Moore, 1887)
- Calluga crassitibia (Warren 1901)
- Calluga grammophora Prout, 1958
- Calluga longispinata (Warren, 1907)
- Calluga lophoceras Prout, 1931
- Calluga miantosoma (Warren, 1907)
- Calluga pallidipunctata (Warren, 1907)
- Calluga psaphara Prout, 1929
- Calluga punctinervis (Holloway, 1976)
- Calluga purpureoviridis (Warren, 1903)
- Calluga semirasata (Warren, 1903)
- Calluga variotincta (Warren, 1907)
