= Calluga purpureoviridis =

Scientific classification
- Domain: Eukaryota
- Kingdom: Animalia
- Phylum: Arthropoda
- Class: Insecta
- Order: Lepidoptera
- Family: Geometridae
- Genus: Calluga
- Species: C. purpureoviridis

Binomial name
- Calluga purpureoviridis (Warren, 1903)

Synonyms
- Aniserpetes purpureoviridis Warren, 1903

Species of moth

Calluga purpureoviridis is a moth in the family Geometridae. It is found in New Guinea.
