= Calluga psaphara =

Scientific classification
- Kingdom: Animalia
- Phylum: Arthropoda
- Clade: Pancrustacea
- Class: Insecta
- Order: Lepidoptera
- Family: Geometridae
- Genus: Calluga
- Species: C. psaphara

Binomial name
- Calluga psaphara Prout, 1929

Species of moth

Calluga psaphara is a moth in the family Geometridae. It is found on Buru.
