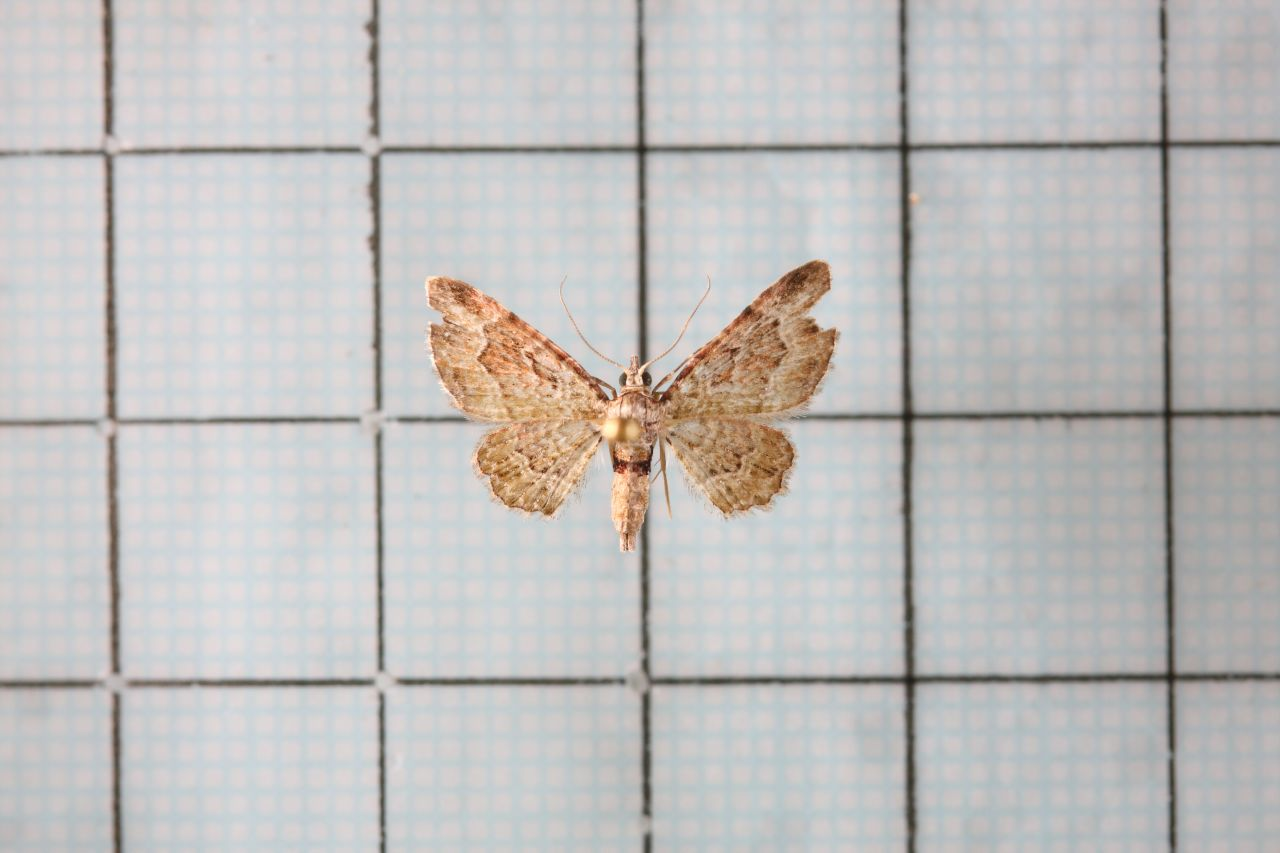

Scientific classification
- Domain: Eukaryota
- Kingdom: Animalia
- Phylum: Arthropoda
- Class: Insecta
- Order: Lepidoptera
- Family: Geometridae
- Genus: Calluga
- Species: C. costalis

Binomial name
- Calluga costalis Moore, 1887

Synonyms
- Eupithecia rufifascia Hampson, 1893; Chloroclystis cissocosma Turner, 1904; Sillophora albiviridis Warren, 1907

= Calluga costalis =

Species of moth

Calluga costalis is a moth of the family Geometridae. The species was first described by Frederic Moore in 1887. It is found in Sri Lanka, Taiwan, Borneo, Bali, Sulawesi, Seram, New Guinea and Queensland.

== Description ==
The wingspan is about 12 mm in the male and 18 mm in the female. Palpi with the second joint reaching slightly beyond the frons. Hindwings with vein 3 from angle of cell or shortly stalked at vein 4. Male lack secondary sexual characters on the wings. Adults dark-green. Forewings with the rufous suffusion confined to the medial area, sometimes to its costal half. Both wings with the postmedial line prominently black with white outer edge, on forewing more evenly curved and waved. Submarginal pale waved line more prominent. The outer margin of hindwings sometimes evenly curved, or excised below apex. Ventral side lack rough scales on hindwings of male.
