= Calluga lophoceras =

Scientific classification
- Kingdom: Animalia
- Phylum: Arthropoda
- Clade: Pancrustacea
- Class: Insecta
- Order: Lepidoptera
- Family: Geometridae
- Genus: Calluga
- Species: C. lophoceras

Binomial name
- Calluga lophoceras Prout, 1931

Species of moth

Calluga lophoceras is a moth in the family Geometridae. It is found in India.
