= Calluga punctinervis =

Scientific classification
- Kingdom: Animalia
- Phylum: Arthropoda
- Clade: Pancrustacea
- Class: Insecta
- Order: Lepidoptera
- Family: Geometridae
- Genus: Calluga
- Species: C. punctinervis

Binomial name
- Calluga punctinervis (Holloway, 1976)

Synonyms
- Chloroclystis punctinervis Holloway, 1976

Species of moth

Calluga punctinervis is a moth in the family Geometridae. It is found on Borneo.
