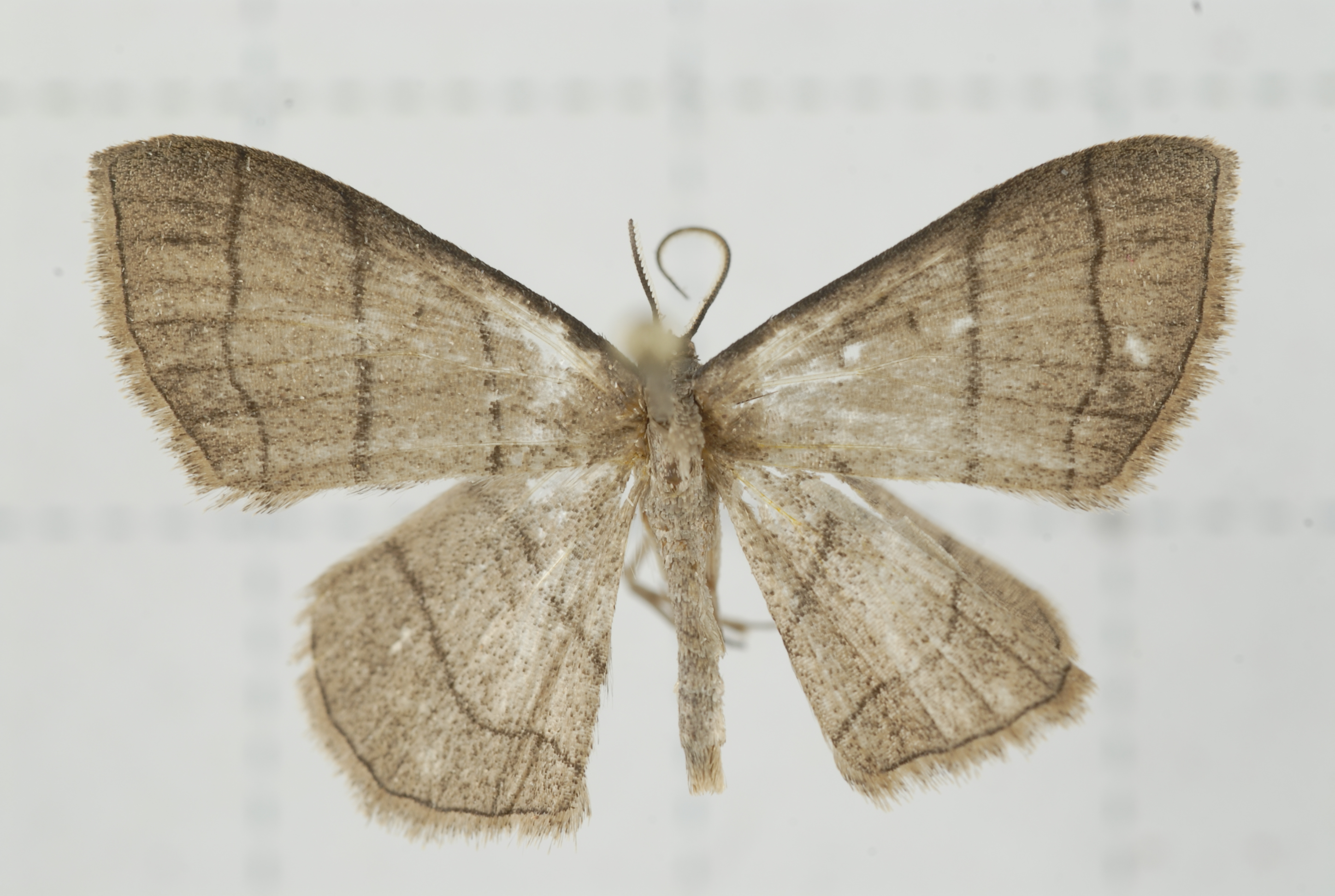

Scientific classification
- Domain: Eukaryota
- Kingdom: Animalia
- Phylum: Arthropoda
- Class: Insecta
- Order: Lepidoptera
- Family: Geometridae
- Genus: Scopula
- Species: S. mecysma

Binomial name
- Scopula mecysma (C. Swinhoe, 1894)

Synonyms
- Dithalama mecysma C. Swinhoe, 1894

= Scopula mecysma =

Species of geometer moth in subfamily Sterrhinae

Scopula mecysma is a moth of the family Geometridae first described by Charles Swinhoe in 1894. It is found in the Himalaya, Taiwan, Thailand and on Borneo, Java, Bali, Sulawesi and New Guinea. The habitat consists of lowland forests.

== Subspecies ==
- Scopula mecysma mecysma (north-eastern Himalaya, Taiwan, Thailand)
- Scopula mecysma mesites L. B. Prout, 1935 (Borneo, Java, Bali, Sulawesi, New Guinea)
