= Scopula ferruginea =

Scientific classification
- Kingdom: Animalia
- Phylum: Arthropoda
- Class: Insecta
- Order: Lepidoptera
- Family: Geometridae
- Genus: Scopula
- Species: S. ferruginea

Binomial name
- Scopula ferruginea (Hampson, 1893)

Synonyms
- Acidalia ferruginea Hampson, 1893

Species of geometer moth in subfamily Sterrhinae

Scopula ferruginea is a moth of the family Geometridae. It was described by George Hampson in 1893. It is endemic to Sri Lanka.

== Description ==
Its wingspan is about 26 millimetres (1.0 in). It is a white moth with black frons. Thorax and abdomen suffused with rusty color. Wings irrorated (sprinkled) with a few black scales. Forewings suffused with a rusty color, which is bright on the medial and basal inner areas. There is an indistinct antemedial line angled below the costa. A black cell-speck. A diffused fuscous postmedial line angled below the costa, then oblique. There is an indistinct rufous submarginal line highly angled at vein 6, and with a black spot at the angle. A sinuous white submarginal line present. Hindwings with antemedial blackish line. Cell-speck present. Sinuous postmedial rufous line, with a rufous bands beyond it, and a submarginal line.
