= Scopula intensata =

Scientific classification
- Domain: Eukaryota
- Kingdom: Animalia
- Phylum: Arthropoda
- Class: Insecta
- Order: Lepidoptera
- Family: Geometridae
- Genus: Scopula
- Species: S. intensata

Binomial name
- Scopula intensata (Moore, 1887)

Synonyms
- Idaea intensata Moore, 1887; Scopula ochriata Prout, 1938

Species of geometer moth in subfamily Sterrhinae

Scopula intensata is a moth of the family Geometridae. It is found in India and Sri Lanka.

== Description ==
Wingspan is 24mm. Male is whitish irrorated with fuscous color. Frons fuscous. Fore wings with brown costa and an oblique antemedial line from cell to inner margin. Medial and postmedial oblique waved line present. Medial line not reaching costa. There are two submarginal and a marginal line. Hind wings with antemedial, postmedial, two submarginal and a marginal line. Female much suffused with fuscous. Fore wings with antemedial line angled in cell and continued to the costa. Both wings with cell-specks. Hind wings with sub-basal line.
