= Scopula modesta =

Scientific classification
- Domain: Eukaryota
- Kingdom: Animalia
- Phylum: Arthropoda
- Class: Insecta
- Order: Lepidoptera
- Family: Geometridae
- Genus: Scopula
- Species: S. modesta

Binomial name
- Scopula modesta (Moore, [1887])

Synonyms
- Tephrina modesta Moore, 1887; Craspedia latimarginaria Hampson, 1891

Species of geometer moth in subfamily Sterrhinae

Scopula modesta is a moth of the family Geometridae. It is found in Sri Lanka and India.

== Description ==
Its wingspan is about 30 mm. Hindwings with more or less angled outer margin at vein 4. Body whitish suffused with brownish fuscous. Forewings with almost straight oblique antemedial line. Both wings with oblique straight medial line with an indistinct diffused fuscous cell-spot inside it on forewings and prominent brown cell-speck beyond it on hindwings. A nearly straight postmedial line, the area beyond it more suffused with brownish fuscous, sometimes with pale sub-marginal patches.
