= Scopula walkeri =

Scientific classification
- Domain: Eukaryota
- Kingdom: Animalia
- Phylum: Arthropoda
- Class: Insecta
- Order: Lepidoptera
- Family: Geometridae
- Genus: Scopula
- Species: S. walkeri

Binomial name
- Scopula walkeri (Butler, 1883)

Synonyms
- Induna walkeri Butler, 1883; Acidalia extimaria Walker, 1861; Craspedia rufilinea Warren, 1895; Craspedia walkeri Butler, 1883

Species of geometer moth in subfamily Sterrhinae

Scopula walkeri is a moth of the family Geometridae. It is found on Sri Lanka.

== Description ==
Its wingspan is about 34 mm. In male, antennae possess serrations and the fascicles of cilia longer than female. Color ochreous grey with more irrorated fuscous. The medial line diffused, and on hindwing embracing the cell-spot. The patches beyond the postmedial line replaced by black marks. Female more irrorated with fuscous color, often prominently so, and with diffused prominent lines.
