= List of moths of Japan (Bombycoidea-Geometroidea) =

List of moths in superfamilies Bombycoidea and Geometroidea

This is a list of the Japanese species of the superfamilies Bombycoidea and Geometroidea. It also acts as an index to the species articles and forms part of the full List of moths of Japan.

== Lasiocampidae ==
- ウスズミカレハ — Poecilocampa tamanukii Matsumura, 1928
- カレハガ — Gastropacha orientalis Sheljuzhko, 1943
- ホシカレハ — Gastropacha populifolia angustipennis Walker, 1855
- ヒロバカレハ — Gastropacha quercifolia cerridifolia Felder & Felder, 1862
- ワタナベカレハ — Gastropacha watanabei Okano, 1966
- ヒメカレハ — Phyllodesma japonicus japonicus (Leech, [1889])
- タカムクカレハ北海道亜種 — Cosmotriche lobulina pinivora (Matsumura, 1927)
- タカムクカレハ本州亜種 — Cosmotriche lobulina takamukuana (Matsumura, 1921)
- ウスマダラカレハ — Pyrosis idiota Graeser, 1888
- タケカレハ — Euthrix albomaculata directa (Swinhoe, 1892)
- タケヒメカレハ — Euthrix laeta sulphurea (Aurivillius, 1895)
- ヨシカレハ — Euthrix potatoria bergmani (Bryk, 1941)
- ギンモンカレハ本土亜種 — Somadasys brevivenis brevivenis (Butler, 1885)
- ギンモンカレハ屋久島亜種 — Somadasys brevivenis yakushimensis Okano, 1965
- スカシカレハ — Amurilla subpurpurea subpurpurea (Butler, 1881)
- リンゴカレハ — Odonestis pruni japonensis Tams, 1935
- マツカレハ — Dendrolimus spectabilis (Butler, 1877)
- ツガカレハ — Dendrolimus superans (Butler, 1877)
- ムラクモカレハ — Lebeda nobilis Walker, 1855
- クヌギカレハ屋久島以北亜種 — Kunugia undans flaveola (Motschulsky, 1866)
- クヌギカレハ琉球亜種 — Kunugia undans iwasakii (Nagano, 1917)
- ヤマダカレハ — Kunugia yamadai Nagano, 1917
- ミヤケカレハ — Takanea excisa (Wileman, 1910)
- シカタカレハ — Malacosoma dentatum Mell, 1938
- オビカレハ — Malacosoma neustrium testaceum (Motschulsky, 1861)

== Eupterotidae ==
- オビガ — Apha aequalis (Felder, 1874)

== Bombycidae ==
- クワコ — Bombyx mandarina (Moore, 1872)
- カイコ — Bombyx mori (Linnaeus, 1758)
- オオクワゴモドキ — Oberthueria falcigera (Butler, 1878)
- カギバモドキ — Pseudandraca gracilis (Butler, 1885)
- スカシサン — Prismosticta hyalinata Butler, 1885
- テンオビシロカサン — Ernolatia moorei (Hutton, 1865)
- イチジクカサン — Trilocha varians (Walker, 1855)

== Saturniidae ==
- ヨナグニサン — Attacus atlas ryukyuensis Inoue, 1993
- シンジュサン本州以西対馬以外亜種 — Samia cynthia pryeri (Butler, 1878)
- エリサン — Samia cynthia ricini Donovan
- シンジュサン北海道・対馬亜種 — Samia cynthia walkeri (Felder & Felder, 1862)
- サクサン — Antheraea pernyi (Guérin-Méneville, 1855)
- ヤママユ北海道亜種 — Antheraea yamamai ussuriensis Schachbazov, 1953
- ヤママユ本州以南屋久島以北亜種 — Antheraea yamamai yamamai (Guérin-Méneville, 1861)
- ヤママユ奄美以南亜種 — Antheraea yamamai yoshimotoi Inoue, 1965
- クスサン屋久島以北亜種 — Saturnia japonica japonica (Moore, 1872)
- クスサン奄美以南亜種 — Saturnia japonica ryukyuensis (Inoue, 1984)
- ヒメヤママユ北海道亜種 — Saturnia jonasii fallax Jordan, 1911
- ヒメヤママユ本州以南亜種 — Saturnia jonasii jonasii (Butler, 1877)
- ウスタビガ北海道亜種 — Rhodinia fugax diana (Oberthür, 1886)
- ウスタビガ本州以南亜種 — Rhodinia fugax fugax (Butler, 1877)
- クロウスタビガ本州亜種 — Rhodinia jankowskii hattoriae Inoue, 1965
- クロウスタビガ北海道亜種 — Rhodinia jankowskii hokkaidoensis Inoue, 1965
- ハグルマヤママユ — Loepa sakaei Inoue, 1965
- オオミズアオ本州以南亜種 — Actias aliena aliena (Butler, 1879)
- オオミズアオ北海道亜種 — Actias aliena sjoeqvisti Bryk, 1949
- オナガミズアオ本州・九州亜種 — Actias gnoma gnoma (Butler, 1877)
- オナガミズアオ北海道亜種 — Actias gnoma mandschurica (Staudinger, 1892)
- オナガミズアオ伊豆諸島亜種 — Actias gnoma miyatai Inoue, 1976
- エゾヨツメ北海道亜種 — Aglia japonica japonica Leech, [1889]
- エゾヨツメ本州以南亜種 — Aglia japonica microtau Inoue, 1958

== Brahmaeidae ==
- イボタガ — Brahmaea japonica Butler, 1873

== Sphingidae ==
- フトオビホソバスズメ — Ambulyx japonica japonica Rothschild, 1894
- ホソバスズメ — Ambulyx ochracea Butler, 1885
- モンホソバスズメ — Ambulyx schauffelbergeri Bremer & Grey, 1853
- アジアホソバスズメ — Ambulyx sericeipennis tobii (Inoue, 1976)
- トビイロスズメ — Clanis bilineata tsingtauica Mell, 1922
- ハガタスズメ — Polyptychus chinensis Rothschild & Jordan, 1903
- モモスズメ — Marumba gaschkewitschii echephron (Boisduval, [1875])
- ヒメクチバスズメ — Marumba jankowskii Oberthür, 1880
- タイワンクチバスズメ — Marumba saishiuana saishiuana Okamoto, 1924
- クチバスズメ — Marumba sperchius sperchius (Ménétriès, 1857)
- オオシモフリスズメ — Langia zenzeroides nawai Rothschild & Jordan, 1903
- ギンボシスズメ — Parum colligata (Walker, 1856)
- ヒサゴスズメ — Mimas christophi (Staudinger, 1887)
- ウンモンスズメ — Callambulyx tatarinovii gabyae Bryk, 1946
- ヒメウチスズメ — Smerinthus caecus Ménétriès, 1957
- ウチスズメ — Smerinthus planus planus Walker, 1856
- コウチスズメ — Smerinthus tokyonis Matsumura, 1921
- ノコギリスズメ — Laothoe amurensis amurensis (Staudinger, 1892)
- エゾスズメ — Phyllosphingia dissimilis dissimilis (Bremer, 1861)
- エビガラスズメ — Agrius convolvuli (Linnaeus, 1758)
- クロメンガタスズメ — Acherontia lachesis (Fabricius, 1798)
- メンガタスズメ — Acherontia styx medusa Moore, [1858]
- エゾシモフリスズメ — Meganoton analis scribae (Austaut, 1911)
- シモフリスズメ — Psilogramma incretum (Walker, 1865)
- クロスズメ — Sphinx caliginea caliginea (Butler, 1877)
- コエビガラスズメ — Sphinx constricta Butler, 1885
- オビグロスズメ北海道亜種 — Sphinx crassistriga aino Kishida, 1990
- オビグロスズメ本州亜種 — Sphinx crassistriga crassistriga (Rothschild & Jordan, 1903)
- エゾコエビガラスズメ — Sphinx ligustri Linnaeus, 1758
- マツクロスズメ対馬亜種 — Sphinx morio aresta (Jordan, 1931)
- マツクロスズメ北海道亜種 — Sphinx morio inouei (Owada & Kogi, 1993)
- マツクロスズメ本州亜種 — Sphinx morio morio (Rothschild & Jordan, 1903)
- ヒメサザナミスズメ — Dolbina exacta Staudinger, 1892
- タイワンサザナミスズメ — Dolbina inexacta (Walker, 1856)
- サザナミスズメ — Dolbina tancrei Staudinger, 1887
- クロテンケンモンスズメ — Kentochrysalis consimilis Rothschild & Jordan, 1903
- クロスキバホウジャク — Hemaris affinis (Bremer, 1861)
- スキバホウジャク — Hemaris radians (Walker, 1856)
- オオスカシバ — Cephonodes hylas hylas (Linnaeus, 1771)
- リュウキュウオオスカシバ — Cephonodes xanthus Rothschild & Jordan, 1903
- トモエスズメ — Daphnis hypothous hypothous (Cramer, 1780)
- キョウチクトウスズメ — Daphnis nerii (Linnaeus, 1758)
- クルマスズメ屋久島亜種 — Ampelophaga rubiginosa lohita Kishida & Yano, 2001
- クルマスズメ九州以北亜種 — Ampelophaga rubiginosa rubiginosa Bremer & Grey, 1853
- ブドウスズメ — Acosmeryx castanea Rothschild & Jordan, 1903
- ハネナガブドウスズメ — Acosmeryx naga naga (Moore, 1858)
- ホシヒメホウジャク — Neogurelca himachala sangaica (Butler, 1875)
- ヒメホウジャク — Neogurelca hyas (Walker, 1856)
- ヒメクロホウジャク — Macroglossum bombylans Boisduval, [1875]
- オキナワクロホウジャク — Macroglossum corythus platyxanthum Rothschild & Jordan, 1903
- オキナワネグロホウジャク — Macroglossum faro (Cramer, 1780)
- フリッツェホウジャク — Macroglossum fritzei Rothschild & Jordan, 1903
- イチモンジホウジャク — Macroglossum heliophilum Boisduval, [1875]
- シロオビホウジャク — Macroglossum mediovitta Rothschild & Jordan, 1903
- チビホウジャク — Macroglossum neotroglodytus Kitching & Cadiou, 2000
- オキナワホウジャク — Macroglossum passalus passalus (Drury, 1773)
- オビホウジャク — Macroglossum poecilum Rothschild & Jordan, 1903
- ホシホウジャク — Macroglossum pyrrhosticta Butler, 1875
- クロホウジャク — Macroglossum saga Butler, 1878
- クロオビホウジャク — Macroglossum sitiene (Walker, 1856)
- ホウジャク — Macroglossum stellatarum (Linnaeus, 1758)
- イブキスズメ — Hyles gallii (Rottemburg, 1775)
- アカオビスズメ — Hyles livornica (Esper, 1779)
- ヒメスズメ — Deilephila askoldensis (Oberthür, 1879)
- ベニスズメ — Deilephila elpenor lewisii (Butler, 1875)
- コシタベニスズメ — Hippotion boerhaviae (Fabricius, 1775)
- シタベニセスジスズメ — Hippotion celerio (Linnaeus, 1758)
- モトグロシタベニスズメ — Hippotion echeclus (Boisduval, [1875])
- マメシタベニスズメ — Hippotion rosetta Swinhoe, 1892
- オバナワスズメ — Hippotion velox (Fabricius, 1793)
- シタベニスズメ — Theretra alecto alecto (Linnaeus, 1758)
- サツマスズメ — Theretra clotho clotho (Drury, 1773)
- コスズメ — Theretra japonica (Boisduval, 1869)
- キイロスズメ — Theretra nessus (Drury, 1773)
- セスジスズメ — Theretra oldenlandiae oldenlandiae (Fabricius, 1775)
- イッポンセスジスズメ — Theretra silhetensis silhetensis (Walker, 1856)
- タイワンベニスズメ — Theretra suffusa (Walker, 1856)
- ミドリスズメ — Pergesa acteus (Cramer, 1779)
- ビロードスズメ — Rhagastis mongoliana (Butler, 1875)
- ミスジビロードスズメ — Rhagastis trilineata Matsumura, 1921

== Uraniidae ==
- シロフタオ — Eversmannia exornata exornata (Eversmann, 1837)
- キスジシロフタオ — Dysaethria cretacea (Butler, 1881)
- マエモンフタオ — Dysaethria erasaria (Christoph, 1881)
- ハガタフタオ — Dysaethria flavistriga (Warren, 1901)
- シタクロオビフタオ — Dysaethria fulvihamata (Hampson, 1912)
- ヒメクロホシフタオ — Dysaethria illotata (Christoph, 1880)
- ミナミクロホシフタオ — Dysaethria meridiana (Inoue, 1982)
- クロホシフタオ — Dysaethria moza (Butler, 1878)
- アトシロオビフタオ — Europlema desistaria (Walker, 1861)
- クロテンシロフタオ — Europlema nivosaria (Walker, 1866)
- オキナワフタオ — Europlema semibrunnea (Pagenstecher, 1888)
- カバイロフタオ — Oroplema oyamana (Matsumura, 1931)
- クロオビシロフタオ — Oroplema plagifera (Butler, 1881)
- クロフタオ — Epiplema styx (Butler, 1881)
- アトキフタオ小笠原以外亜種 — Warreniplema fumicosta fumicosta (Warren, 1896)
- アトキフタオ小笠原亜種 — Warreniplema fumicosta islandica Inoue, 1996
- マルバネフタオ — Monobolodes prunaria (Moore, [1877])
- コモンマルバネフタオ — Phazaca alikangensis (Strand, 1916)
- アマミマルバネフタオ — Phazaca kosemponicola (Strand, 1916)
- アサケマルバネフタオ — Phazaca theclata (Guenée, 1857)
- エグリフタオ — Chundana emarginatus (Hampson, 1891)
- ギンツバメ — Acropteris iphiata (Guenée, 1857)
- サキシマギンツバメ — Acropteris sparsaria (Walker, 1861)
- ヤクシマギンツバメ — Pseudomicronia advocataria (Walker, 1861)
- オオツバメガ — Lyssa zampa (Butler, 1869)

== Geometridae ==
- クロフカバシャク — Archiearis notha okanoi (Inoue, 1958)
- カバシャク北海道亜種 — Archiearis parthenias bella (Inoue, 1955)
- カバシャク本州亜種 — Archiearis parthenias elegans (Inoue, 1955)
- スギタニシロエダシャク — Abraxas flavisinuata Warren, 1894
- ミナミマダラエダシャク — Abraxas formosilluminata Inoue, 1984
- クロマダラエダシャク — Abraxas fulvobasalis Warren, 1894
- スグリシロエダシャク — Abraxas grossulariata conspurcata Butler, 1878
- ヒトスジマダラエダシャク — Abraxas latifasciata Warren, 1894
- ユウマダラエダシャク琉球亜種 — Abraxas miranda aesia Prout, 1925
- ユウマダラエダシャク本土亜種 — Abraxas miranda miranda Butler, 1878
- ヒメマダラエダシャク — Abraxas niphonibia Wehrli, 1935
- ヘリグロマダラエダシャク — Abraxas satoi Inoue, 1972
- キタマダラエダシャク — Abraxas sylvata microtate Wehrli, 1931
- シロオビヒメエダシャク北海道亜種 — Lomaspilis marginata amurensis (Hedemann, 1881)
- シロオビヒメエダシャク本州以南亜種 — Lomaspilis marginata opis Butler, 1878
- キブサヒメエダシャク — Ligdia ciliaria Leech, 1897
- シロスジヒメエダシャク — Ligdia japonaria Leech, 1897
- クロフヒメエダシャク — Peratophyga hyalinata grata (Butler, 1879)
- サザナミオビエダシャク — Heterostegane hyriaria Warren, 1894
- フタホシシロエダシャク — Lomographa bimaculata subnotata (Warren, 1895)
- オオフタスジシロエダシャク — Lomographa claripennis Inoue, 1977
- マエキシロエダシャク — Lomographa inamata (Walker, 1861)
- ウスオビシロエダシャク — Lomographa nivea (Djakonov, 1936)
- クロズウスキエダシャク — Lomographa simplicior simplicior (Butler, 1881)
- ウスフタスジシロエダシャク — Lomographa subspersata (Wehrli, 1939)
- バラシロエダシャク — Lomographa temerata ([Denis & Schiffermüller], 1775)
- ヤマトエダシャク — Peratostega deletaria hypotaenia (Prout, 1930)
- ウチムラサキヒメエダシャク — Ninodes splendens (Butler, 1878)
- ワタナベヒメエダシャク — Ninodes watanabei Inoue, 1976
- クロミスジシロエダシャク — Myrteta angelica Butler, 1881
- ホシスジシロエダシャク — Myrteta punctata (Warren, 1894)
- キスジシロエダシャク — Orthocabera sericea sericea Butler, 1879
- ナミスジシロエダシャク沖縄亜種 — Orthocabera tinagmaria rubripunctata (Wehrli, 1939)
- ナミスジシロエダシャク本土亜種 — Orthocabera tinagmaria tinagmaria (Guenée, 1857)
- ミスジシロエダシャク — Taeniophila unio (Oberthür, 1880)
- フタオビシロエダシャク — Lamprocabera candidaria (Leech, 1897)
- ミスジコナフエダシャク — Cabera exanthemata insulata Inoue, 1958
- アトグロアミメエダシャク — Cabera griseolimbata griseolimbata (Oberthür, 1879)
- コスジシロエダシャク — Cabera purus (Butler, 1878)
- ヒラヤマシロエダシャク — Cabera schaefferi Bremer, 1864
- フタスジウスキエダシャク — Parabapta aetheriata (Graeser, 1889)
- ウスアオエダシャク — Parabapta clarissa (Butler, 1878)
- イハラエダシャク — Parabapta iharai Yazaki, 1989
- フタスジオエダシャク — Rhynchobapta cervinaria bilineata (Leech, 1891)
- シロミャクオエダシャク — Rhynchobapta eburnivena (Warren, 1896)
- マエキオエダシャク — Plesiomorpha flaviceps (Butler, 1881)
- モンオビオエダシャク — Plesiomorpha punctilinearia (Leech, 1891)
- フタモントガリエダシャク — Nadagara prosigna Prout, 1930
- ミナミトガリエダシャク — Nadagara subnubila Inoue, 1967
- マルバエダシャク — Boninnadagara crinomorpha Inoue, 1994
- ニッコウキエダシャク — Pseudepione magnaria (Wileman, 1911)
- フタテンソトグロキエダシャク — Pseudepione shiraii Inoue, 1943
- ウスオビヒメエダシャク — Euchristophia cumulata cumulata (Christoph, 1881)
- クロハグルマエダシャク — Synegia esther Butler, 1881
- ハグルマエダシャク本土亜種 — Synegia hadassa hadassa (Butler, 1878)
- ハグルマエダシャク屋久島亜種 — Synegia hadassa yakushimensis Sato, 1990
- マルハグルマエダシャク — Synegia ichinosawana (Matsumura, 1925)
- スジハグルマエダシャク — Synegia limitatoides Inoue, 1982
- ミナミハグルマエダシャク — Synegia masuii Sato, 1990
- オオツカハグルマエダシャク — Synegia ohtsukai Sato, 1990
- アベリアハグルマエダシャク本土亜種 — Synegia pallens abeliae Sato, 1990
- アベリアハグルマエダシャク屋久島亜種 — Synegia pallens pallens Inoue, 1982
- オオハグルマエダシャク — Borbacha pardaria (Guenée, 1857)
- シロズエダシャク — Ecpetelia albifrontaria (Leech, 1891)
- コトビスジエダシャク — Petelia rivulosa (Butler, 1881)
- オオヨスジアカエダシャク — Astygisa chlororphnodes (Wehrli, 1936)
- ヨスジアカエダシャク — Astygisa morosa morosa (Butler, 1881)
- ウラキトガリエダシャク — Hypephyra terrosa pryeraria (Leech, 1891)
- ツマキエダシャク — Platycerota incertaria (Leech, 1891)
- ツマキアカエダシャク — Platycerota particolor (Warren, 1896)
- ナガオエダシャク — Chiasmia cinerearia (Bremer & Grey, 1853)
- ヒメアミメエダシャク本州以南亜種 — Chiasmia clathrata albifenestra (Inoue, 1942)
- ヒメアミメエダシャク北海道亜種 — Chiasmia clathrata kurilata (Bryk, 1942)
- フタテンオエダシャク — Chiasmia defixaria (Walker, 1861)
- オキナワオエダシャク — Chiasmia emersaria emersaria (Walker, 1861)
- ウスオエダシャク — Chiasmia hebesata (Walker, 1861)
- ギンネムエダシャク — Macaria abydata Guenée, 1857
- キトビエダシャク — Macaria brunneata sordida (Butler, 1881)
- シロオビオエダシャク — Macaria fuscaria (Leech, 1891)
- チャオビオエダシャク — Macaria liturata pressaria Christoph, 1893
- シャンハイオエダシャク — Macaria shanghaisaria shanghaisaria Walker, 1861
- シナノオエダシャク — Macaria signaria (Hübner, [1809])
- ウスキオエダシャク — Oxymacaria normata proximaria (Leech, 1897)
- フトスジオエダシャク — Oxymacaria pryeri (Butler, 1879)
- クロモンオエダシャク — Oxymacaria temeraria (Swinhoe, 1891)
- クロフキエダシャク — Monocerotesa lutearia (Leech, 1891)
- ツマジロエダシャク — Krananda latimarginaria Leech, 1891
- スカシエダシャク — Krananda semihyalina Moore, 1868
- ソトオビエダシャク — Isturgia arenacearia ([Denis & Schiffermüller], 1775)
- ウスネズミエダシャク — Isturgia vapulata (Butler, 1879)
- アカエダシャク — Ectephrina semilutea pruinosaria (Bremer, 1864)
- トビカギバエダシャク — Luxiaria amasa amasa (Butler, 1878)
- ミナミトビカギバエダシャク — Luxiaria mitorrhaphes Prout, 1927
- カギバエダシャク — Pseudonadagara hepatica Inoue, 1994
- キトビカギバエダシャク — Pseudonadagara semicolor (Warren, 1895)
- アトムスジエダシャク — Aporhoptrina semiorbiculata (Christoph, 1881)
- ダイセツタカネエダシャク — Glacies coracina daisetsuzana (Matsumura, 1925)
- ヘリグロエダシャク — Bupalus vestalis vestalis Staudinger, 1897
- キオビエダシャク — Milionia zonea pryeri Druce, 1888
- ウメエダシャク — Cystidia couaggaria couaggaria (Guenée, 1858)
- トンボエダシャク — Cystidia stratonice stratonice (Stoll, 1782)
- ヒロオビトンボエダシャク — Cystidia truncangulata Wehrli, 1933
- キベリゴマフエダシャク — Epobeidia tigrata leopardaria (Oberthür, 1881)
- シロジマエダシャク本土・対馬亜種 — Euryobeidia languidata languidata (Walker, 1862)
- シロジマエダシャク屋久島亜種 — Euryobeidia languidata yakushimensis Inoue, 1976
- ゴマダラシロエダシャク — Antipercnia albinigrata albinigrata (Warren, 1896)
- オオゴマダラエダシャク — Parapercnia giraffata (Guenée, 1857)
- クロフオオシロエダシャク — Pogonopygia nigralbata nigralbata Warren, 1894
- タイワンオオシロエダシャク — Pogonopygia pavida contaminata (Inoue, 1971)
- クロフシロエダシャク — Dilophodes elegans elegans (Butler, 1878)
- オオシロエダシャク — Metabraxas clerica clerica Butler, 1881
- ウスゴマダラエダシャク — Metabraxas paucimaculata Inoue, 1955
- シロホシエダシャク — Arichanna albomacularia Leech, 1891
- ヒョウモンエダシャク屋久島亜種 — Arichanna gaschkevitchii deminuta Inoue, 1956
- ヒョウモンエダシャク本土亜種 — Arichanna gaschkevitchii gaschkevitchii (Motschulsky, 1860)
- キシタエダシャク対馬亜種 — Arichanna melanaria askoldinaria (Oberthür, 1880)
- キシタエダシャク本土亜種 — Arichanna melanaria fraterna (Butler, 1878)
- プライヤエダシャク — Arichanna pryeraria Leech, 1891
- キジマエダシャク — Arichanna tetrica tetrica (Butler, 1881)
- チャノウンモンエダシャク屋久島以北亜種 — Jankowskia fuscaria fuscaria (Leech, 1891)
- チャノウンモンエダシャク奄美以南亜種 — Jankowskia fuscaria naitoi Sato, 1980
- キタウンモンエダシャク — Jankowskia pseudathleta Sato, 1980
- クロクモエダシャク — Apocleora rimosa (Butler, 1878)
- アマミシロテンエダシャク — Cleora amamiensis Sato, 1978
- キタルリモンエダシャク — Cleora cinctaria superfumata Inoue, 1972
- リュウキュウフトスジエダシャク — Cleora injectaria injectaria (Walker, 1860)
- ルリモンエダシャク — Cleora insolita (Butler, 1878)
- シロテンエダシャク — Cleora leucophaea (Butler, 1878)
- ヤクシマフトスジエダシャク — Cleora minutaria (Leech, 1891)
- オガサワラフトスジエダシャク — Cleora ogasawarensis Inoue, 1994
- フトスジエダシャク — Cleora repulsaria (Walker, 1860)
- ソトシロモンエダシャク — Cleora venustaria (Leech, 1891)
- ニセオレクギエダシャク — Protoboarmia faustinata (Warren, 1897)
- オレクギエダシャク — Protoboarmia simpliciaria (Leech, 1897)
- マルバトビスジエダシャク — Anaboarmia aechmeessa (Prout, 1929)
- ナカウスエダシャク — Alcis angulifera (Butler, 1878)
- イツスジエダシャク — Alcis extinctaria moesta (Butler, 1881)
- コケエダシャク — Alcis jubata melanonota Prout, 1930
- ヒメナカウスエダシャク — Alcis medialbifera Inoue, 1972
- シロシタオビエダシャク — Alcis picata (Butler, 1881)
- オオナカホシエダシャク — Alcis pryeraria (Leech, 1897)
- フタヤマエダシャク — Rikiosatoa grisea grisea (Butler, 1878)
- フタキスジエダシャク — Gigantalcis flavolinearia (Leech, 1891)
- ババエダシャク — Hesperumia babai Sato, 1980
- マダラシロエダシャク — Hesperumia silvicola (Inoue, 1953)
- ネグロエダシャク — Ramobia basifuscaria (Leech, 1891)
- ナカジロネグロエダシャク — Ramobia mediodivisa Inoue, 1953
- マツオオエダシャク — Deileptenia ribeata (Clerck, 1759)
- ウスバシロエダシャク — Pseuderannis amplipennis (Inoue, 1942)
- ウスバキエダシャク — Pseuderannis lomozemia (Prout, 1930)
- ツシマウスグロエダシャク — Polymixinia appositaria (Leech, 1891)
- アキバエダシャク — Hypomecis akiba (Inoue, 1963)
- フトオビエダシャク — Hypomecis crassestrigata crassestrigata (Christoph, 1880)
- ナカシロオビエダシャク — Hypomecis definita (Butler, 1878)
- ヒメミスジエダシャク — Hypomecis kuriligena (Bryk, 1942)
- オオバナミガタエダシャク — Hypomecis lunifera (Butler, 1879)
- ウスバミスジエダシャク本土・屋久島亜種 — Hypomecis punctinalis conferenda (Butler, 1878)
- ウスバミスジエダシャク対馬亜種 — Hypomecis punctinalis referendaria (Bryk, 1949)
- ハミスジエダシャク — Hypomecis roboraria displicens (Butler, 1878)
- アマミミスジエダシャク — Hypomecis yuwanina (Sato, 1981)
- クロオオモンエダシャク — Microcalicha fumosaria fumosaria (Leech, 1891)
- シタクモエダシャク — Microcalicha sordida (Butler, 1878)
- ソトシロオビエダシャク — Calicha ornataria ornataria (Leech, 1891)
- トビネオオエダシャク — Phthonosema invenustarium (Leech, 1891)
- リンゴツノエダシャク — Phthonosema tendinosarium (Bremer, 1864)
- ヨツメエダシャク — Ophthalmitis albosignaria albosignaria (Bremer & Grey, 1853)
- コヨツメエダシャク — Ophthalmitis irrorataria (Bremer & Grey, 1853)
- ヨモギエダシャク本州以南亜種 — Ascotis selenaria cretacea (Butler, 1879)
- ヨモギエダシャク北海道亜種 — Ascotis selenaria ijimai Inoue, 1955
- ヒロバウスアオエダシャク — Paradarisa chloauges kurosawai Inoue, 1956
- シナトビスジエダシャク — Paradarisa consonaria (Hübner, [1799])
- ナミガタエダシャク — Heterarmia charon charon (Butler, 1878)
- マエモンキエダシャク — Heterarmia costipunctaria (Leech, 1891)
- トガリスジグロエダシャク — Heterarmia dissimilis (Staudinger, 1897)
- セブトエダシャク本州以南亜種 — Cusiala stipitaria kariuzawensis (Bryk, 1949)
- セブトエダシャク北海道亜種 — Cusiala stipitaria stipitaria (Oberthür, 1880)
- ウストビスジエダシャク — Ectropis aigneri Prout, 1930
- フトフタオビエダシャク — Ectropis crepuscularia ([Denis & Schiffermüller], 1775)
- オオトビスジエダシャク — Ectropis excellens (Butler, 1884)
- ウスジロエダシャク — Ectropis obliqua (Prout, 1915)
- シロモンキエダシャク — Parectropis similaria japonica Sato, 1980
- シロテントビスジエダシャク — Abaciscus albipunctatus (Inoue, 1955)
- ウスチャトビモンエダシャク屋久島亜種 — Psilalcis breta postmaculata Inoue, 1956
- ウスチャトビモンエダシャク奄美以南亜種 — Psilalcis breta rantaizana (Wileman, 1911)
- ウスグロナミエダシャク — Phanerothyris sinearia noctivolans (Butler, 1881)
- ホシミスジエダシャク — Racotis boarmiaria japonica Inoue, 1953
- ナミスジエダシャク — Racotis petrosa (Butler, 1879)
- ハンノトビスジエダシャク — Aethalura ignobilis (Butler, 1878)
- キバネトビスジエダシャク — Myrioblephara cilicornaria (Püngeler, 1903)
- チビトビスジエダシャク — Myrioblephara nanaria (Staudinger, 1897)
- ハラゲエダシャク — Diplurodes vestita fuscovestita Inoue, 1976
- ハラゲチビエダシャク — Satoblephara parvularia parvularia (Leech, 1891)
- クロスジハイイロエダシャク — Hirasa paupera (Butler, 1881)
- オオツバメエダシャク — Amblychia angeronaria Guenée, 1857
- チャマダラエダシャク — Amblychia insueta (Butler, 1878)
- ヒロオビオオエダシャク — Xandrames dholaria Moore, 1868
- シロスジオオエダシャク本土亜種 — Xandrames latiferaria latiferaria (Walker, 1860)
- シロスジオオエダシャク屋久島亜種 — Xandrames latiferaria recondita Inoue, 1982
- ヒロオビエダシャク — Duliophyle agitata agitata (Butler, 1878)
- オオトビエダシャク — Duliophyle majuscularia (Leech, 1897)
- ツマキウスグロエダシャク — Scionomia anomala anomala (Butler, 1881)
- ソトキクロエダシャク — Scionomia mendica mendica (Butler, 1879)
- コツマキウスグロエダシャク — Scionomia parasinuosa Inoue, 1982
- キマダラツバメエダシャク — Thinopteryx crocoptera striolata Butler, 1883
- ミヤマツバメエダシャク — Thinopteryx delectans (Butler, 1878)
- フタマタフユエダシャク — Larerannis filipjevi Wehrli, 1945
- ヒロバフユエダシャク — Larerannis miracula (Prout, 1929)
- ナカジマフユエダシャク — Larerannis nakajimai Inoue, 1986
- ウスオビフユエダシャク — Larerannis orthogrammaria (Wehrli, 1927)
- トギレエダシャク — Protalcis concinnata (Wileman, 1911)
- シロフフユエダシャク — Agriopis dira (Butler, 1879)
- クロスジフユエダシャク — Pachyerannis obliquaria (Motschulsky, 1861)
- オオチャバネフユエダシャク — Erannis defoliaria gigantea Inoue, 1955
- チャバネフユエダシャク — Erannis golda Djakonov, 1929
- チャオビフユエダシャク — Phigaliohybernia fulvinfula Inoue, 1942
- ウスシモフリトゲエダシャク — Phigalia djakonovi Moltrecht, 1933
- シモフリトゲエダシャク — Phigalia sinuosaria Leech, 1897
- シロトゲエダシャク — Phigalia verecundaria (Leech, 1897)
- ムクゲエダシャク — Lycia hirtaria parallelaria Inoue, 1958
- フチグロトゲエダシャク — Nyssiodes lefuarius (Erschoff, 1872)
- クワトゲエダシャク — Apochima excavata (Dyar, 1905)
- オカモトトゲエダシャク — Apochima juglansiaria (Graeser, 1889)
- キイロトゲエダシャク — Apochima praeacutaria (Inoue, 1976)
- カバシタムクゲエダシャク — Sebastosema bubonarium Warren, 1896
- アシズリエダシャク — Megabiston ashizuriensis Sato & Kawakami, 2001
- チャエダシャク — Megabiston plumosaria (Leech, 1891)
- オオシモフリエダシャク — Biston betularia parvus Leech, 1897
- クロズエダシャク — Biston marginata Shiraki, 1913
- シロシモフリエダシャク — Biston melacron Wehrli, 1941
- キオビゴマダラエダシャク — Biston panterinaria sychnospilas (Prout, 1930)
- ハイイロオオエダシャク — Biston regalis comitata (Warren, 1899)
- トビモンオオエダシャク屋久島以北亜種 — Biston robustus robustus Butler, 1879
- トビモンオオエダシャク奄美以南亜種 — Biston robustus ryukyuense Inoue, 1964
- チャオビトビモンエダシャク — Biston strataria hasegawai Inoue, 1955
- タケウチエダシャク — Biston takeuchii Matsumura, 1931
- フタオレウスグロエダシャク — Biston thoracicaria (Oberthür, 1884)
- アサヒナオオエダシャク — Amraica asahinai (Inoue, 1964)
- サキシマオオエダシャク — Amraica kimurai Sato, 2003
- ウスイロオオエダシャク — Amraica superans superans (Butler, 1878)
- アミメオオエダシャク — Mesastrape fulguraria consors (Butler, 1878)
- ウスズミエダシャク — Lassaba fuliginosa (Inoue & Sato, 1986)
- ニッコウエダシャク — Lassaba nikkonis (Butler, 1881)
- ニトベエダシャク — Wilemania nitobei (Nitobe, 1907)
- アトジロエダシャク — Pachyligia dolosa Butler, 1878
- ハスオビエダシャク — Descoreba simplex simplex Butler, 1878
- ナンカイキイロエダシャク — Doratoptera amabilis (Yazaki, 1988)
- キイロエダシャク — Doratoptera virescens Marumo, 1920
- カバエダシャク — Colotois pennaria ussuriensis Bang-Haas, 1927
- ヒロバトガリエダシャク — Planociampa antipala Prout, 1930
- ホソバトガリエダシャク — Planociampa modesta (Butler, 1878)
- ゴマフキエダシャク — Angerona nigrisparsa Butler, 1879
- スモモエダシャク — Angerona prunaria turbata Prout, 1930
- ツマトビキエダシャク — Bizia aexaria Walker, 1860
- ハガタキエダシャク — Ctenognophos grandinarius grandinarius (Motschulsky, 1861)
- オイワケキエダシャク — Exangerona prattiaria (Leech, 1891)
- スジグロエダシャク — Arbognophos amoenarius (Staudinger, 1897)
- コウノエダシャク — Elophos vittaria kononis (Matsumura, 1927)
- コケヒメエダシャク — Dischidesia kurokoi Inoue, 1963
- クワエダシャク — Phthonandria atrilineata atrilineata (Butler, 1881)
- エゾウスクモエダシャク — Phthonandria emaria (Bremer, 1864)
- ハルタウスクモエダシャク — Menophra harutai (Inoue, 1954)
- ウスクモエダシャク — Menophra senilis (Butler, 1878)
- ヒゲマダラエダシャク — Cryptochorina amphidasyaria (Oberthür, 1880)
- ハスオビカバエダシャク — Pseudaspilates obliquizona (Inoue, 1953)
- フタスジギンエダシャク — Megaspilates mundataria (Stoll, 1782)
- ギンスジエダシャク — Chariaspilates formosaria (Eversmann, 1837)
- クロモンキリバエダシャク — Psyra bluethgeni (Püngeler, 1903)
- ミスジキリバエダシャク四国亜種 — Psyra boarmiata masuii Inoue, 1982
- ミスジキリバエダシャク本州亜種 — Psyra boarmiata subcuneata Inoue, 1954
- サラサエダシャク — Epholca arenosa (Butler, 1878)
- シロモンクロエダシャク — Proteostrenia leda (Butler, 1878)
- モンキクロエダシャク — Proteostrenia pica Wileman, 1911
- ハスオビキエダシャク — Scardamia aurantiacaria Bremer, 1864
- マエキトビエダシャク — Nothomiza formosa (Butler, 1878)
- オオマエキトビエダシャク — Nothomiza oxygoniodes Wehrli, 1939
- ヒメキリバエダシャク — Ennomos infidelis (Prout, 1929)
- キリバエダシャク — Ennomos nephotropa Prout, 1930
- オオノコメエダシャク — Acrodontis fumosa (Prout, 1930)
- ヒメノコメエダシャク — Acrodontis kotshubeji Sheljuzhko, 1944
- タンチャメノコメエダシャク — Acrodontis tanchame Kobayashi, 1995
- マダラノコメエダシャク — Acrodontis yazakii Kobayashi, 1995
- エグリヅマエダシャク本土伊豆諸島以外亜種 — Odontopera arida arida (Butler, 1878)
- エグリヅマエダシャク伊豆諸島亜種 — Odontopera arida melancholica (Inoue, 1961)
- キイロエグリヅマエダシャク — Odontopera aurata (Prout, 1915)
- ウスグロノコバエダシャク — Odontopera bidentata harutai (Inoue, 1953)
- ウスアカオビエダシャク — Meteima mediorufa mediorufa (Bastelberger, 1911)
- フタモンキバネエダシャク — Crocallis elinguaria (Linnaeus, 1758)
- ヨスジキエダシャク — Cotta incongruaria (Walker, 1860)
- モンシロツマキリエダシャク奄美以南亜種 — Xerodes albonotarius aritai (Inoue, 1971)
- モンシロツマキリエダシャク屋久島以北亜種 — Xerodes albonotarius nesiotis (Wehrli, 1940)
- ミスジツマキリエダシャク — Xerodes rufescentarius rufescentarius (Motschulsky, [1861])
- コガタツマキリエダシャク — Xerodes sordidatus (Inoue, 1987)
- キマダラツマキリエダシャク — Zanclidia testacea (Butler, 1881)
- ミカンコエダシャク — Hyposidra talaca (Walker, 1860)
- テンモンチビエダシャク — Ocoelophora lentiginosaria lentiginosaria (Leech, 1891)
- キエダシャク — Auaxa sulphurea (Butler, 1875)
- キイロミミモンエダシャク — Eilicrinia parvula Wehrli, 1940
- ミミモンエダシャク — Eilicrinia wehrlii Djakonov, 1933
- ツマキリウスキエダシャク — Pareclipsis gracilis (Butler, 1879)
- エグリエダシャク — Fascellina chromataria Walker, 1860
- ウスムラサキエダシャク — Selenia adustaria Leech, 1891
- ハガタムラサキエダシャク — Selenia sordidaria Leech, 1897
- ムラサキエダシャク — Selenia tetralunaria (Hufnagel, 1769)
- イチモジエダシャク — Apeira syringaria (Linnaeus, 1758)
- エグリイチモジエダシャク — Agaraeus discolor (Warren, 1893)
- コガタイチモジエダシャク — Agaraeus parvus distans (Warren, 1895)
- ナシモンエダシャク対馬亜種 — Garaeus mirandus minimus Inoue, 1982
- ナシモンエダシャク本州・四国・九州亜種 — Garaeus mirandus mirandus (Butler, 1881)
- ナシモンエダシャク北海道亜種 — Garaeus mirandus mirificus Bang-Haas, 1927
- キバラエダシャク — Garaeus specularis mactans (Butler, 1878)
- ウラモンアカマダラエダシャク — Entomopteryx combusta (Warren, 1893)
- トガリエダシャク — Xyloscia subspersata (Felder & Rogenhofer, 1875)
- ツマキリエダシャク — Endropiodes abjectus abjectus (Butler, 1879)
- ツツジツマキリエダシャク — Endropiodes circumflexus Inoue, 1976
- モミジツマキリエダシャク — Endropiodes indictinarius (Bremer, 1864)
- ナカキエダシャク — Plagodis dolabraria (Linnaeus, 1767)
- コナフキエダシャク本州低地・四国・九州亜種 — Plagodis pulveraria japonica (Butler, 1881)
- コナフキエダシャク北海道亜種 — Plagodis pulveraria jezoensis (Inoue, 1954)
- コナフキエダシャク本州高山帯亜種 — Plagodis pulveraria montana (Inoue, 1954)
- リョクモンエダシャク — Celenna festivaria manifesta (Inoue, 1964)
- フタマエホシエダシャク — Achrosis paupera (Butler, 1881)
- フタテンエダシャク — Seleniopsis evanescens (Butler, 1881)
- ウラベニエダシャク — Heterolocha aristonaria (Walker, 1860)
- アカネエダシャク — Heterolocha coccinea Inoue, 1976
- ヒメウラベニエダシャク — Heterolocha laminaria sutschanska Wehrli, 1937
- ベニスジエダシャク — Heterolocha stulta (Butler, 1879)
- ウラモンアカエダシャク — Parepione grata (Butler, 1878)
- アトボシエダシャク — Cepphis advenaria (Hübner, 1790)
- シダエダシャク — Petrophora chlorosata (Scopoli, 1763)
- ウラモントガリエダシャク — Hypoxystis mandli uniformis Inoue, 1955
- アキヨシトガリエダシャク — Hypoxystis pulcheraria (Herz, 1905)
- ツマトビシロエダシャク — Spilopera debilis (Butler, 1878)
- ヒメウコンエダシャク — Corymica arnearia Walker, 1860
- ヘリグロキエダシャク — Corymica deducta deducta (Walker, 1866)
- ウコンエダシャク — Corymica pryeri (Butler, 1878)
- フトスジツバメエダシャク — Ourapteryx japonica Inoue, 1993
- シロツバメエダシャク — Ourapteryx maculicaudaria (Motschulsky, 1866)
- ウスキツバメエダシャク — Ourapteryx nivea Butler, 1884
- ノムラツバメエダシャク — Ourapteryx nomurai Inoue, 1946
- コガタツバメエダシャク — Ourapteryx obtusicauda (Warren, 1894)
- ヒメツバメエダシャク — Ourapteryx subpunctaria Leech, 1891
- トラフツバメエダシャク — Tristrophis veneris (Butler, 1878)
- ホシシャク — Naxa seriaria (Motschulsky, 1866)
- ハスオビトガリシャク — Sarcinodes mongaku Marumo, 1920
- ムラサキトガリシャク — Sarcinodes yaeyamana Inoue, 1976
- クロバネフユシャク — Alsophila foedata Inoue, [1944]
- ユキムカエフユシャク — Alsophila inouei Nakajima, 1989
- シロオビフユシャク — Alsophila japonensis (Warren, 1894)
- サクフウフユシャク — Alsophila yanagitai Nakajima, 1995
- スジモンフユシャク — Alsophiloides acroama (Inoue, [1944])
- フタスジフユシャク — Inurois asahinai Inoue, 1974
- ウスバフユシャク — Inurois fletcheri Inoue, 1954
- ウスモンフユシャク — Inurois fumosa (Inoue, [1944])
- シュゼンジフユシャク — Inurois kobayashii Nakajima, 1992
- クジュウフユシャク — Inurois kyushuensis Inoue, 1974
- クロテンフユシャク — Inurois membranaria (Christoph, 1881)
- アカウスバフユシャク — Inurois minutulus Nakajima & Kudo, 1987
- ヤマウスバフユシャク — Inurois nikkoensis Nakajima, 1992
- ホソウスバフユシャク — Inurois tenuis Butler, 1879
- オビベニホシシャク — Eumelea biflavata insulata Warren, 1896
- メスキベニホシシャク — Eumelea ludovicata ludovicata Guenée, 1857
- チビウスバホシシャク — Derambila fragilis (Butler, 1880)
- オキナワトガリシャク — Ozola defectata Inoue, 1971
- エグリトガリシャク — Ozola japonica Prout, 1910
- ウスアオアヤシャク — Pingasa aigneri Prout, 1930
- オオシロアヤシャク — Pingasa alba brunnescens Prout, 1913
- コアヤシャク — Pingasa pseudoterpnaria pseudoterpnaria (Guenée, 1857)
- タイワンアヤシャク — Pingasa ruginaria pacifica Inoue, 1964
- オオアヤシャク — Pachista superans (Butler, 1878)
- ウスアオシャク — Dindica virescens (Butler, 1878)
- チズモンアオシャク — Agathia carissima carissima Butler, 1878
- オガサワラチズモンアオシャク — Agathia ichnospora Prout, 1934
- ヤエヤマチズモンアオシャク — Agathia laetata (Fabricius, 1794)
- マダラチズモンアオシャク本土離島以外亜種 — Agathia lycaenaria chizumon Inoue, 1956
- マダラチズモンアオシャク伊豆諸島亜種 — Agathia lycaenaria reducta Inoue, 1961
- マダラチズモンアオシャク琉球亜種 — Agathia lycaenaria samuelsoni Inoue, 1964
- マダラチズモンアオシャク男女諸島亜種 — Agathia lycaenaria subreducta Inoue, 1982
- アシブトチズモンアオシャク伊豆諸島以外亜種 — Agathia visenda curvifiniens Prout, 1917
- アシブトチズモンアオシャク伊豆諸島亜種 — Agathia visenda suzukii Inoue, 1963
- アトヘリアオシャク — Aracima muscosa muscosa Butler, 1878
- ノコバアオシャク — Timandromorpha enervata Inoue, 1944
- ヒメカギバアオシャク — Mixochlora vittata prasina (Butler, 1879)
- カギバアオシャク — Tanaorhinus reciprocatus confuciarius (Walker, 1861)
- カギシロスジアオシャク — Geometra dieckmanni Graeser, 1889
- コシロオビアオシャク — Geometra glaucaria Ménétriès, 1859
- オオシロオビアオシャク — Geometra papilionaria subrigua (Prout, 1935)
- シロオビアオシャク — Geometra sponsaria (Bremer, 1864)
- マエモンシロスジアオシャク — Geometra ussuriensis (Sauber, 1915)
- クロスジアオシャク — Geometra valida Felder & Rogenhofer, 1875
- キマエアオシャク — Neohipparchus vallatus (Butler, 1878)
- シロフアオシャク — Eucyclodes diffictus (Walker, 1861)
- ヒメシロフアオシャク — Eucyclodes infractus (Wileman, 1911)
- オオサザナミシロアオシャク — Pelagodes antiquadrarius (Inoue, 1976)
- チビサザナミシロアオシャク — Pelagodes ogasawarensis Inoue, 1994
- ヒメサザナミアオシャク — Pelagodes proquadrarius (Inoue, 1976)
- クスアオシャク — Pelagodes subquadrarius (Inoue, 1976)
- サザナミシロアオシャク — Thalassodes immissaria intaminata Inoue, 1971
- トガリサザナミシロアオシャク — Thalassodes supracutipennis Inoue, 1994
- スカシヒメアオシャク — Jodis amamiensis Inoue, 1982
- ウスミズアオシャク — Jodis argutaria (Walker, 1866)
- オオナミガタアオシャク — Jodis dentifascia Warren, 1897
- ナミガタウスキアオシャク — Jodis lactearia (Linnaeus, 1758)
- コガタヒメアオシャク — Jodis orientalis Wehrli, 1923
- ヒメナミガタアオシャク — Jodis placida Inoue, 1986
- マルモンヒメアオシャク — Jodis praerupta (Butler, 1878)
- ヒメウスアオシャク — Jodis putata Wehrli, 1923
- ウスキヒメアオシャク — Jodis urosticta Prout, 1930
- スジモンツバメアオシャク — Maxates albistrigata (Warren, 1895)
- ツバメアオシャク — Maxates ambigua (Butler, 1878)
- ズグロツバメアオシャク — Maxates fuscofrons (Inoue, 1954)
- ハガタツバメアオシャク — Maxates grandificaria (Graeser, 1890)
- ヒロバツバメアオシャク — Maxates illiturata (Walker, [1863])
- ヒメツバメアオシャク — Maxates protrusa (Butler, 1878)
- サキシマツバメアオシャク — Maxates versicauda microptera (Inoue, 1982)
- コガタアオシャク — Aoshakuna chlorissoides (Prout, 1912)
- スジツバメアオシャク — Aoshakuna lucia lucia (Thierry-Mieg, 1917)
- キバラヒメアオシャク — Hemithea aestivaria (Hübner, [1799])
- ハラアカヒメアオシャク — Hemithea beethoveni Inoue, 1942
- アオスジアオシャク — Hemithea marina (Butler, 1878)
- ヘリグロヒメアオシャク — Hemithea tritonaria (Walker, 1863)
- ハラアカアオシャク — Chlorissa amphitritaria (Oberthür, 1879)
- ホソバハラアカアオシャク — Chlorissa anadema (Prout, 1930)
- ウスハラアカアオシャク — Chlorissa inornata (Matsumura, 1925)
- コウスアオシャク — Chlorissa obliterata (Walker, 1863)
- オキナワコアオシャク — Idiochlora minuscula (Inoue, 1986)
- ヒメアオシャク — Idiochlora takahashii (Inoue, 1982)
- ナミスジコアオシャク — Idiochlora ussuriaria (Bremer, 1864)
- ヘリアカトガリアオシャク — Pamphlebia rubrolimbraria rubrolimbraria (Guenée, 1857)
- アカアシアオシャク — Culpinia diffusa (Walker, 1861)
- ハガタアオシャク — Thalera rubrifimbria Inoue, 1990
- ウラジロアオシャク — Spaniocentra hollowayi Inoue, 1986
- ヘリジロヨツメアオシャク — Comibaena amoenaria (Oberthür, 1880)
- ギンスジアオシャク — Comibaena argentataria (Leech, 1897)
- クロモンアオシャク — Comibaena delicatior (Warren, 1897)
- ヨツテンアオシャク — Comibaena diluta (Warren, 1895)
- カラフトウスアオシャク — Comibaena ingrata (Wileman, 1911)
- アマミヨツモンアオシャク — Comibaena insulana Inoue, 1986
- ヨツモンマエジロアオシャク — Comibaena procumbaria (Pryer, 1877)
- ミナミクロモンアオシャク — Comibaena subdelicata Inoue, 1986
- ヨツメアオシャク — Thetidia albocostaria (Bremer, 1864)
- ナミガタフタスジアオシャク — Thetidia smaragdaria amurensis (Prout, 1935)
- ヘリクロテンアオシャク — Hemistola dijuncta (Walker, 1861)
- ハガタキスジアオシャク — Hemistola tenuilinea (Alphéraky, 1897)
- コシロスジアオシャク — Hemistola veneta (Butler, 1879)
- チビムジアオシャク — Mujiaoshakua plana (Wileman, 1911)
- アカホシヒメアオシャク — Comostola rubripunctata (Warren, 1909)
- コヨツメアオシャク伊豆諸島亜種 — Comostola subtiliaria insulata Inoue, 1963
- コヨツメアオシャク琉球亜種 — Comostola subtiliaria kawazoei Inoue, 1963
- コヨツメアオシャク本土・対馬・屋久島亜種 — Comostola subtiliaria nympha (Butler, 1881)
- アカヘリヒメアオシャク — Eucrostes disparata Walker, 1861
- シロモンウスチャヒメシャク — Organopoda carnearia (Walker, 1861)
- シロモンアオヒメシャク — Dithecodes erasa Warren, 1900
- フタナミトビヒメシャク — Pylargosceles steganioides steganioides (Butler, 1878)
- フトベニスジヒメシャク — Timandra apicirosea (Prout, 1935)
- コベニスジヒメシャク — Timandra comptaria Walker, 1863
- トガリベニスジヒメシャク — Timandra convectaria Walker, 1861
- ウスベニスジヒメシャク — Timandra dichela (Prout, 1935)
- ベニスジヒメシャク北海道亜種 — Timandra recompta ovidius (Bryk, 1942)
- ベニスジヒメシャク本州以南亜種 — Timandra recompta prouti (Inoue, 1958)
- サキシマベニスジヒメシャク — Timandra sakishimensis (Inoue, 1971)
- マエアカヒメシャク — Traminda aventiaria (Guenée, 1857)
- ヨツメヒメシャク — Cyclophora albipunctata griseolata (Staudinger, 1897)
- ビンガタヒメシャク — Chrysocraspeda faganaria (Guenée, 1857)
- モモイロヒメシャク — Chrysocraspeda sanguinea Warren, 1896
- クロモンウスチャヒメシャク — Perixera absconditaria absconditaria (Walker, [1863])
- コブウスチャヒメシャク — Perixera illepidaria (Guenée, 1857)
- コガタウスチャヒメシャク — Perixera minorata dubiosa (Prout, 1938)
- クスイウスチャヒメシャク — Perixera niveopuncta (Warren, 1897)
- オキナワウスチャヒメシャク — Perixera obliviaria (Walker, 1861)
- クロテンウスチャヒメシャク — Perixera obrinaria obrinaria (Guenée, 1857)
- ウンモンオオシロヒメシャク — Somatina indicataria morata Prout, 1938
- フタツメオオシロヒメシャク — Problepsis albidior matsumurai Prout, 1938
- クロスジオオシロヒメシャク — Problepsis diazoma Prout, 1938
- ツシマオオシロヒメシャク — Problepsis eucircota Prout, 1913
- ウススジオオシロヒメシャク — Problepsis plagiata (Butler, 1881)
- ヒトツメオオシロヒメシャク — Problepsis superans superans (Butler, 1885)
- ミドリヒメシャク — Antitrygodes divisarius perturbatus Prout, 1914
- クシヒゲハイイロヒメシャク — Antilycauges pinguis (Swinhoe, 1902)
- オキナワトガリヒメシャク — Scopula anisopleura Inoue, 1982
- クロテンシロヒメシャク — Scopula apicipunctata (Christoph, 1881)
- キスジシロヒメシャク — Scopula asthena Inoue, 1943
- ウスアカヒメシャク — Scopula caesaria (Walker, 1861)
- ミスジハイイロヒメシャク — Scopula cineraria (Leech, 1897)
- ウスキトガリヒメシャク — Scopula confusa (Butler, 1878)
- シモフリシロヒメシャク — Scopula coniaria (Prout, 1913)
- ウラナミヒメシャク — Scopula corrivalaria eccletica Prout, 1935
- マルバヒメシャク — Scopula duplinupta Inoue, 1982
- キトガリヒメシャク — Scopula emissaria lactea (Butler, 1879)
- ミナミヒメシャク — Scopula emma jordani (West, 1930)
- ギンバネヒメシャク — Scopula epiorrhoe Prout, 1935
- イリオモテトガリヒメシャク — Scopula eulomata (Snellen, 1877)
- ヤスジマルバヒメシャク — Scopula floslactata claudata (Prout, 1913)
- クリームヒメシャク — Scopula gilva Sato, 1993
- サカハチヒメシャク — Scopula hanna (Butler, 1878)
- ミナミハイイロヒメシャク — Scopula hypochra (Meyrick, 1888)
- ハスジトガリヒメシャク本州以南亜種 — Scopula ichinosawana honshuensis Inoue, 1982
- ハスジトガリヒメシャク北海道亜種 — Scopula ichinosawana ichinosawana (Matsumura, 1925)
- ウスキクロテンヒメシャク — Scopula ignobilis (Warren, 1901)
- ハイイロヒメシャク — Scopula impersonata macescens (Butler, 1879)
- サツマヒメシャク — Scopula insolata satsumaria (Leech, 1897)
- チビシロヒメシャク — Scopula kawabei Inoue, 1982
- ウラモンクロスジヒメシャク — Scopula limbata (Wileman, 1915)
- ウスウラナミヒメシャク — Scopula longicerata Inoue, 1955
- ヘリグロヒメシャク — Scopula luridata sternecki Prout, 1935
- ミチノクヒメシャク — Scopula michinoku Sato, 1994
- モントビヒメシャク — Scopula modicaria (Leech, 1897)
- オキナワクロテンヒメシャク — Scopula nesciaria absconditaria (Walker, 1861)
- マエキヒメシャク本州以南亜種 — Scopula nigropunctata imbella (Warren, 1901)
- マエキヒメシャク北海道亜種 — Scopula nigropunctata subimbella Inoue, 1958
- シロヒメシャク — Scopula nivearia (Leech, 1897)
- サザナミシロヒメシャク — Scopula nupta (Butler, 1878)
- フチグロシロヒメシャク — Scopula ornata subornata (Prout, 1913)
- ナミスジチビヒメシャク — Scopula personata (Prout, 1913)
- ナガサキヒメシャク — Scopula plumbearia (Leech, 1881)
- オオクロテンヒメシャク — Scopula praesignipuncta Prout, 1920
- ウラクロスジシロヒメシャク — Scopula prouti Djakonov, 1935
- クロスジシロヒメシャク — Scopula pudicaria (Motschulsky, 1861)
- タイワントガリヒメシャク — Scopula pulchellata takowensis Prout, 1938
- ミナミウスキヒメシャク — Scopula remotata (Guenée, 1857)
- ウスサカハチヒメシャク — Scopula semignobilis Inoue, 1942
- ウラテンシロヒメシャク — Scopula subpunctaria (Herrich-Schäffer, 1847)
- ヨツボシウスキヒメシャク — Scopula superciliata (Prout, 1913)
- キナミシロヒメシャク — Scopula superior (Butler, 1878)
- シベチャシロヒメシャク — Scopula supernivearia Inoue, 1963
- タカオシロヒメシャク — Scopula takao Inoue, 1954
- アメイロヒメシャク — Scopula tenuisocius Inoue, 1942
- スミレシロヒメシャク北海道亜種 — Scopula umbelaria graeseri Prout, 1935
- スミレシロヒメシャク本州以南亜種 — Scopula umbelaria majoraria (Leech, 1897)
- コヒメシャク — Scopula virgulata albicans (Prout, 1913)
- ヨスジキヒメシャク — Idaea auricruda (Butler, 1879)
- エゾキヒメシャク — Idaea aversata japonica (Inoue, 1955)
- ウスキヒメシャク — Idaea biselata (Hufnagel, 1767)
- サキシマキヒメシャク — Idaea contravalida Inoue, 1982
- クロモンチビヒメシャク — Idaea crassipuncta (Inoue, 1971)
- ウスモンキヒメシャク — Idaea denudaria (Prout, 1913)
- モンウスキヒメシャク — Idaea effusaria (Christoph, 1881)
- クロテントビヒメシャク — Idaea foedata (Butler, 1879)
- オオウスモンキヒメシャク — Idaea imbecilla (Inoue, 1955)
- キオビベニヒメシャク — Idaea impexa impexa (Butler, 1879)
- オイワケヒメシャク伊豆諸島亜種 — Idaea invalida faceta (Inoue, 1943)
- オイワケヒメシャク伊豆諸島以外亜種 — Idaea invalida invalida (Butler, 1879)
- フチベニヒメシャク — Idaea jakima (Butler, 1878)
- キュウシュウヒメシャク — Idaea kyushuensis Sato, 1994
- ベニヒメシャク — Idaea muricata minor (Sterneck, 1927)
- チビキヒメシャク — Idaea neovalida (Inoue, 1958)
- オビベニヒメシャク — Idaea nielseni (Hedemann, 1879)
- ウスキヒカリヒメシャク — Idaea nitidata (Herrich-Schäffer, 1861)
- キヒメシャク — Idaea nudaria infuscaria (Leech, 1897)
- マエベニヒメシャク — Idaea obliteraria (Leech, 1879)
- コフチベニヒメシャク — Idaea okinawensis Inoue, 1982
- ツシマキヒメシャク — Idaea paravalida Sato, 1988
- ウスジロヒカリヒメシャク — Idaea promiscuaria (Leech, 1879)
- ホソスジキヒメシャク — Idaea remissa (Wileman, 1911)
- シタベニヒメシャク — Idaea roseomarginaria (Inoue, 1958)
- サクライキヒメシャク — Idaea sakuraii (Inoue, 1963)
- ウスクロテンヒメシャク — Idaea salutaria (Christoph, 1881)
- タナカヒメシャク — Idaea tanakai Sato, 1994
- クロオビキヒメシャク — Idaea terpnaria (Prout, 1913)
- ミジンキヒメシャク — Idaea trisetata (Prout, 1922)
- ツマアカナミシャク北海道亜種 — Aplocera perelegans kurilata (Bryk, 1942)
- ツマアカナミシャク本州以南亜種 — Aplocera perelegans perelegans (Warren, 1894)
- テンオビナミシャク — Acasis appensata (Eversmann, 1842)
- アヤコバネナミシャク — Acasis bellaria (Leech, 1891)
- ルリオビナミシャク — Acasis viretata viretata (Hübner, [1799])
- シロオビコバネナミシャク — Neopachrophilla albida Inoue, 1955
- ホソクロオビシロナミシャク — Trichopteryx auricilla Inoue, 1955
- シロシタコバネナミシャク — Trichopteryx fastuosa Inoue, 1958
- シロテンコバネナミシャク — Trichopteryx grisearia (Leech, 1891)
- シタコバネナミシャク — Trichopteryx hemana (Butler, 1878)
- ハイイロコバネナミシャク — Trichopteryx ignorata Inoue, 1958
- ウスオビコバネナミシャク — Trichopteryx incerta Yazaki, 1978
- ヒメシタコバネナミシャク — Trichopteryx microloba Inoue, 1943
- ウスミドリコバネナミシャク — Trichopteryx miracula Inoue, 1942
- クロシタコバネナミシャク — Trichopteryx misera (Butler, 1879)
- オビコバネナミシャク — Trichopteryx muscigera (Butler, 1881)
- チャマダラコバネナミシャク — Trichopteryx nagaii Inoue, 1958
- ハネナガコバネナミシャク — Trichopteryx polycommata anna Inoue, 1955
- チャオビコバネナミシャク — Trichopteryx terranea (Butler, 1878)
- マダラコバネナミシャク — Trichopteryx ussurica (Wehrli, 1927)
- クロオビシロナミシャク — Trichopteryx ustata (Christoph, 1881)
- ウスベニスジナミシャク — Esakiopteryx volitans (Butler, 1878)
- ウスアカモンナミシャク — Trichopterigia consobrinaria (Leech, 1891)
- アカモンナミシャク — Trichopterigia costipunctaria Leech, 1897
- シロシタヒメナミシャク — Lobophora halterata ijimai Inoue, 1955
- アトスジグロナミシャク — Epilobophora obscuraria (Leech, 1891)
- クロフシロナミシャク — Otoplecta frigida (Butler, 1878)
- ゴマダラシロナミシャク — Naxidia maculata (Butler, 1879)
- ヒメゴマダラシロナミシャク — Naxidia semiobscura Inoue, 1955
- ホシスジトガリナミシャク — Carige cruciplaga cruciplaga (Walker, 1861)
- ヒロバトガリナミシャク — Carige irrorata (Butler, 1879)
- ウスキクロスジナミシャク — Carige obsoleta (Inoue, 1971)
- ホソバトガリナミシャク — Carige scutilimbata Prout, 1936
- モンクロキイロナミシャク — Stamnodes danilovi sugitanii Prout, 1937
- シロオビクロナミシャク本州以南亜種 — Trichobaptria exsecuta exsecuta (Felder & Rogenhofer, 1875)
- シロオビクロナミシャク北海道亜種 — Trichobaptria exsecuta latifasciaria (Leech, 1897)
- シラフシロオビナミシャク北海道亜種 — Trichodezia kindermanni latifasciaria Matsumura, 1925
- シラフシロオビナミシャク本州以南亜種 — Trichodezia kindermanni leechi Inoue, 1946
- シロホソオビクロナミシャク本州以南亜種 — Baptria tibiale aterrima (Butler, 1877)
- シロホソオビクロナミシャク北海道亜種 — Baptria tibiale hiroobi Inoue, 1954
- コウスグモナミシャク — Heterophleps confusa confusa (Wileman, 1911)
- サキシマウスクモナミシャク — Heterophleps endoi Inoue, 1982
- ウスクモナミシャク奄美亜種 — Heterophleps fusca amamiensis Inoue, 1964
- ウスクモナミシャク本土亜種 — Heterophleps fusca fusca (Butler, 1878)
- ミツボシナミシャク — Heterophleps pallescens (Warren, 1896)
- アオナミシャク — Leptostegna tenerata Christoph, 1881
- ホソバナミシャク奄美亜種 — Tyloptera bella amamiensis Sato, 1986
- ホソバナミシャク本土亜種 — Tyloptera bella bella (Butler, 1878)
- シラユキナミシャク — Palaeomystis mabillaria (Poujade, 1895)
- キリバネホソナミシャク — Brabira artemidora artemidora (Oberthür, 1884)
- チャホシホソバナミシャク — Brabira kasaii Sato, 1986
- テングホソナミシャク — Sauris angustifasciata (Inoue, 1976)
- ナンカイヒゲブトナミシャク — Sauris hirudinata Guenée, 1857
- ミナミヒゲブトナミシャク — Sauris interruptata (Moore, 1888)
- コバネヒゲブトナミシャク — Sauris marginepunctata (Warren, 1899)
- ヒゲブトナミシャク — Sauris nanaria Leech, 1897
- マダラヒゲブトナミシャク — Episteira eupena (Prout, 1936)
- ウスミドリナミシャク — Episteira nigrilinearia nigrilinearia (Leech, 1897)
- ミドリホソナミシャク — Phthonoloba viridifasciata (Inoue, 1963)
- ハガタチビナミシャク — Hastina subfalcaria subfalcaria (Christoph, 1881)
- フタオモドキナミシャク — Macrohastina azela azela (Butler, 1878)
- キアシシロナミシャク本州以南亜種 — Xanthorhoe abraxina abraxina (Butler, 1879)
- キアシシロナミシャク北海道亜種 — Xanthorhoe abraxina pudicata (Christoph, 1881)
- ナカシロスジナミシャク — Xanthorhoe biriviata angularia (Leech, 1897)
- アカマダラシマナミシャク — Xanthorhoe dentipostmediana Inoue, 1954
- トビスジコナミシャク — Xanthorhoe designata rectantemediana (Wehrli, 1927)
- クロモンミヤマナミシャク — Xanthorhoe fluctuata malleola Inoue, 1955
- フタトビスジナミシャク — Xanthorhoe hortensiaria (Graeser, 1889)
- ツマグロナミシャク — Xanthorhoe muscicapata (Christoph, 1881)
- ナカクロオビナミシャク — Xanthorhoe purpureofascia Inoue, 1982
- ヨスジナミシャク — Xanthorhoe quadrifasciata ignobilis (Butler, 1881)
- タカネナミシャク — Xanthorhoe sajanaria (Prout, 1914)
- フトジマナミシャク — Xanthorhoe saturata (Guenée, 1857)
- ハングロナミシャク — Xanthorhoe semilactescens Inoue, 1982
- キタミナミシャク — Xanthorhoe separata Inoue, 2004
- トビスジヒメナミシャク — Orthonama obstipata (Fabricius, 1794)
- ウスイロトビスジナミシャク — Costaconvexa caespitaria (Christoph, 1881)
- シラナミナミシャク — Glaucorhoe unduliferaria unduliferaria (Motschulsky, 1861)
- ハコベナミシャク — Euphyia cineraria (Butler, 1878)
- フタテンツマジロナミシャク — Euphyia unangulata gracilaria (Bang-Haas, 1906)
- フタモンクロナミシャク — Catarhoe obscura obscura (Butler, 1878)
- ムツテンナミシャク — Catarhoe yokohamae (Butler, 1881)
- ハチノジクロナミシャク — Pseudobaptria corydalaria japonica (Hori, 1929)
- ニッコウナミシャク — Amoebotricha grataria (Leech, 1891)
- ミカヅキナミシャク — Earophila correlata (Warren, 1901)
- ウラウスキナミシャク — Protonebula umbrifera (Butler, 1879)
- タテスジナミシャク — Pareulype consanguinea (Butler, 1878)
- チャイロナミシャク — Pelurga comitata (Linnaeus, 1758)
- ネスジナミシャク — Pelurga onoi (Inoue, 1965)
- クロアシナミシャク — Pelurga taczanowskiaria (Oberthür, 1880)
- キンオビナミシャク — Electrophaes corylata granitalis (Butler, 1881)
- ヒメキンオビナミシャク — Electrophaes recens Inoue, 1982
- イチゴナミシャク — Mesoleuca albicillata casta (Butler, 1878)
- チャオビマエモンナミシャク — Mesoleuca mandshuricata (Bremer, 1864)
- ヒトスジシロナミシャク本州以南亜種 — Epirrhoe hastulata echigoensis Inoue, 1982
- ヒトスジシロナミシャク北海道亜種 — Epirrhoe hastulata reducta (Djakonov, 1929)
- フタシロスジナミシャク — Epirrhoe supergressa supergressa (Butler, 1878)
- シロテンサザナミナミシャク — Entephria amplicosta Inoue, 1955
- サザナミナミシャク — Entephria caesiata nebulosa Inoue, 1955
- モンキキナミシャク — Idiotephria amelia (Butler, 1878)
- ギフウスキナミシャク — Idiotephria debilitata (Leech, 1891)
- ナカモンキナミシャク — Idiotephria evanescens (Staudinger, 1897)
- ヤナギナミシャク — Hydriomena furcata nexifasciata (Butler, 1881)
- ヒロオビナミシャク — Hydriomena impluviata insulata Inoue, 1953
- ウスグロオオナミシャク — Triphosa dubitata amblychiles Prout, 1837
- マエモンオオナミシャク — Triphosa sericata sericata (Butler, 1879)
- クモオビナミシャク — Triphosa umbraria (Leech, 1891)
- クロヤエナミシャク — Triphosa vashti vashti (Butler, 1878)
- シロモンオオナミシャク — Rheumaptera albiplaga latiplaga (Inoue, 1976)
- シロヤエナミシャク — Rheumaptera flavipes flavipes (Ménétriès, 1858)
- オオシロオビクロナミシャク — Rheumaptera hastata rikovskensis (Matsumura, 1925)
- サカハチクロナミシャク本州以南亜種 — Rheumaptera hecate hecate (Butler, 1878)
- サカハチクロナミシャク北海道亜種 — Rheumaptera hecate matsumurai Inoue, 1977
- ウスベニナミシャク — Rheumaptera hedemannaria (Oberthür, 1880)
- ツマグロヤエナミシャク — Rheumaptera inanata (Christoph, 1881)
- オイワケヤエナミシャク — Rheumaptera latifasciaria (Leech, 1891)
- キボシヤエナミシャク — Rheumaptera neocervinalis Inoue, 1982
- ヤエナミシャク — Rheumaptera undulata (Linnaeus, 1758)
- エゾヤエナミシャク — Philereme corrugata (Butler, 1884)
- トビスジヤエナミシャク — Philereme transversata japanaria (Leech, 1891)
- ネグロウスベニナミシャク — Photoscotosia atrostrigata (Bremer, 1864)
- オオネグロウスベニナミシャク — Photoscotosia lucicolens (Butler, 1878)
- テンヅマナミシャク — Telenomeuta punctimarginaria punctimarginaria (Leech, 1891)
- キガシラオオナミシャク本州以南亜種 — Gandaritis agnes agnes (Butler, 1878)
- キガシラオオナミシャク北海道亜種 — Gandaritis agnes festinaria (Christoph, 1881)
- マルモンシロナミシャク — Gandaritis evanescens (Butler, 1881)
- キマダラオオナミシャク — Gandaritis fixseni (Bremer, 1864)
- オオナミシャク — Gandaritis maculata Swinhoe, 1894
- キベリシロナミシャク — Gandaritis placida (Butler, 1878)
- ツマキシロナミシャク本州以南亜種 — Gandaritis whitelyi leechi (Inoue, 1955)
- ツマキシロナミシャク北海道亜種 — Gandaritis whitelyi whitelyi (Butler, 1878)
- ナミガタシロナミシャク — Callabraxas compositata compositata (Guenée, 1857)
- ヨコジマナミシャク — Eulithis convergenata (Bremer, 1864)
- ウストビモンナミシャク — Eulithis ledereri (Bremer, 1864)
- チョウセンハガタナミシャク — Eulithis prunata leucoptera (Djakonov, 1929)
- キジマソトグロナミシャク北海道亜種 — Eulithis pyropata elegans (Inoue, 1955)
- キジマソトグロナミシャク本州以南亜種 — Eulithis pyropata pyropata (Hübner, [1809])
- キマダラナミシャク — Eulithis testata (Linnaeus, 1761)
- ナワメナミシャク — Lampropteryx jameza jameza (Butler, 1878)
- アトクロナミシャク — Lampropteryx minna (Butler, 1881)
- チビアトクロナミシャク — Lampropteryx otregiata Metcalfe, 1917
- ヒダカアトクロナミシャク — Lampropteryx suffumata ([Denis & Schiffermüller], 1775)
- ナカクロモンシロナミシャク — Cosmorhoe ocellata (Linnaeus, 1758)
- セスジナミシャク — Evecliptopera illitata illitata (Wileman, 1911)
- セキナミシャク — Ecliptopera capitata mariesii (Butler, 1881)
- ソトキナミシャク — Ecliptopera pryeri (Butler, 1881)
- ヒメハガタナミシャク — Ecliptopera silaceata leuca (Djakonov, 1929)
- オオハガタナミシャク — Ecliptopera umbrosaria umbrosaria (Motschulsky, 1861)
- ミヤマアミメナミシャク — Eustroma aerosum (Butler, 1878)
- キアミメナミシャク — Eustroma japonicum Inoue, 1986
- ハガタナミシャク — Eustroma melancholicum melancholicum (Butler, 1878)
- アミメナミシャク — Eustroma reticulatum obsoletum Djakonov, 1929
- ホソスジナミシャク — Lobogonodes complicata complicata (Butler, 1879)
- キホソスジナミシャク — Lobogonodes erectaria (Leech, 1897)
- シロホソスジナミシャク — Lobogonodes multistriata (Moore, 1889)
- キスジビロードナミシャク — Sibatania arizana fluctigera Hiramatsu, 1978
- ビロードナミシャク — Sibatania mactata (Felder & Rogenhofer, 1875)
- トビモンシロナミシャク — Plemyria rubiginata japonica Inoue, 1955
- シロマダラナミシャク — Dysstroma albicoma (Inoue, 1954)
- フタテンナカジロナミシャク — Dysstroma cinereatum japonicum Heydemann, 1929
- ツマキナカジロナミシャク — Dysstroma citratum nyiwonis (Matsumura, 1925)
- ウスキナカジロナミシャク本州以南亜種 — Dysstroma infuscatum euglaucum Inoue, 1976
- ウスキナカジロナミシャク北海道亜種 — Dysstroma infuscatum subglaucum Inoue, 1955
- マエキナカジロナミシャク — Dysstroma korbi Heydemann, 1929
- アルプスナカジロナミシャク — Dysstroma pseudimmanatum splendidum Inoue, 1976
- ウチジロナミシャク — Dysstroma truncatum fusconebulosm Inoue, 1976
- ネアカナカジロナミシャク — Paradysstroma corussarium (Oberthür, 1880)
- キオビハガタナミシャク — Thera variata bellisi Viidalepp, 1977
- ミヤマクロオビナミシャク — Praethera anomala (Inoue, 1954)
- オオクロオビナミシャク — Praethera praefecta (Prout, 1914)
- ウスクロオビナミシャク — Pennithera abolla (Inoue, 1943)
- クロオビナミシャク — Pennithera comis (Butler, 1879)
- シロシタトビイロナミシャク — Heterothera postalbida (Wileman, 1911)
- モトクロオビナミシャク — Heterothera quadrifulta (Prout, 1928)
- マダラクロオビナミシャク — Heterothera serrataria (Prout, 1914)
- ソウウンクロオビナミシャク — Heterothera taigana sounkeana (Matsumura, 1927)
- フタクロテンナミシャク本州以南亜種 — Xenortholitha propinguata niphonica (Butler, 1878)
- フタクロテンナミシャク北海道亜種 — Xenortholitha propinguata suavata (Christoph, 1881)
- コナミフユナミシャク — Operophtera brunnea Nakajima, 1991
- ヒメクロオビフユナミシャク — Operophtera crispifascia Inoue, 1982
- サザナミフユナミシャク — Operophtera japonaria (Leech, 1891)
- ミヤマフユナミシャク — Operophtera nana Inoue, 1955
- イチモジフユナミシャク — Operophtera rectipostmediana Inoue, 1942
- クロオビフユナミシャク — Operophtera relegata Prout, 1908
- オオナミフユナミシャク — Operophtera variabilis Nakajima, 1991
- アキナミシャク — Epirrita autumnata autumna (Bryk, 1942)
- ミドリアキナミシャク — Epirrita viridipurpurescens (Prout, 1937)
- ナカオビアキナミシャク — Nothoporinia mediolineata (Prout, 1914)
- シロオビマルバナミシャク — Solitanea defricata (Püngeler, 1903)
- トビスジトガリナミシャク — Zola terranea terranea (Butler, 1879)
- キモンハイイロナミシャク — Venusia blomeri (Curtis, 1832)
- ミヤマナミシャク — Venusia cambrica Curtis, 1839
- クロスジカバイロナミシャク — Venusia laria ilara (Prout, 1938)
- フタモンコナミシャク — Venusia megaspilata (Warren, 1895)
- ナナスジナミシャク — Venusia phasma (Butler, 1879)
- マエモンハイイロナミシャク本州以南亜種 — Venusia semistrigata expressa Inoue, 1963
- マエモンハイイロナミシャク北海道亜種 — Venusia semistrigata semistrigata (Christoph, 1881)
- カバイロヒメナミシャク — Hydrelia adesma Prout, 1930
- マダラウスナミシャク — Hydrelia bicauliata Prout, 1914
- キヒメナミシャク — Hydrelia flammeolaria (Hufnagel, 1767)
- ホソスジハイイロナミシャク — Hydrelia gracilipennis Inoue, 1982
- テンスジヒメナミシャク — Hydrelia nisaria (Christoph, 1881)
- チビヒメナミシャク — Hydrelia shioyana (Matsumura, 1927)
- キスジハイイロナミシャク — Hydrelia sylvata ([Denis & Schiffermüller], 1775)
- ハンノナミシャク — Euchoeca nebulata (Scopoli, 1763)
- ヘリスジナミシャク — Eschatarchia lineata lineata Warren, 1894
- ウステンシロナミシャク — Asthena amurensis (Staudinger, 1897)
- キムジシロナミシャク — Asthena corculina Butler, 1878
- マンサクシロナミシャク — Asthena hamadryas Inoue, 1976
- ムスジシロナミシャク — Asthena nymphaeata (Staudinger, 1897)
- フタマタシロナミシャク — Asthena ochrifasciaria Leech, 1897
- キマダラシロナミシャク — Asthena octomacularia Leech, 1897
- カラフトシロナミシャク — Asthena sachalinensis (Matsumura, 1925)
- スカシシロナミシャク — Asthena undulata (Wileman, 1915)
- キイロナミシャク — Pseudostegania defectata (Christoph, 1881)
- セジロナミシャク — Laciniodes denigratus ussuriensis Prout, 1939
- セグロナミシャク — Laciniodes unistirpis (Butler, 1878)
- キベリヒメナミシャク — Eois grataria (Walker, 1861)
- マエチャナミシャク — Acolutha pictaria shirozui Inoue, 1955
- ハガタマエチャナミシャク — Acolutha pulchella semifulva Warren, 1905
- アカモンコナミシャク — Palpoctenidia phoenicosoma semilauta Prout, 1939
- ハネナガナミシャク — Physetobasis dentifascia triangulifera Inoue, 1954
- ハマダラナミシャク — Pomasia denticlathrata Warren, 1893
- コカバスジナミシャク — Martania fulvida (Butler, 1881)
- キオビカバスジナミシャク — Martania minimata (Staudinger, 1897)
- ヒメカバスジナミシャク — Martania saxea (Wileman, 1911)
- ウスカバスジナミシャク — Martania taeniata (Stephens, 1831)
- クロカバスジナミシャク — Gagitodes parvaria parvaria (Leech, 1891)
- ヤハズナミシャク — Gagitodes sagittata albiflua (Prout, 1939)
- ウスモンチビナミシャク — Perizoma contritum (Prout, 1913)
- フタオビカバナミシャク — Perizoma haasi (Hedemann, 1881)
- ミヤマチビナミシャク — Perizoma japonicum Inoue, 1955
- オオクロテンカバナミシャク — Eupithecia abietaria debrunneata Staudinger, 1897
- ホソチビナミシャク — Eupithecia absinthiata (Clerck, 1759)
- ウラモンカバナミシャク — Eupithecia actaeata praenubilata Inoue, 1958
- ミジンカバナミシャク — Eupithecia addictata Dietze, 1908
- ウストビナミシャク — Eupithecia amplexata pryeriaria Leech, 1897
- オオウストビナミシャク — Eupithecia antaggregata Inoue, 1977
- ヒコサンカバナミシャク — Eupithecia antivulgaria Inoue, 1965
- ヒメカバナミシャク — Eupithecia aritai Inoue, 1977
- カラスナミシャク — Eupithecia caliginea Butler, 1878
- モンウスカバナミシャク — Eupithecia clavifera Inoue, 1955
- クロモンカバナミシャク — Eupithecia consortaria Leech, 1897
- シタジロカバナミシャク — Eupithecia conterminata idiopusillata Inoue, 1979
- 和名未定 — Eupithecia costalis Walker, 1869
- マエテンカバナミシャク — Eupithecia costiconvexa Inoue, 1979
- ヨホシナミシャク — Eupithecia costimacularia Leech, 1897
- ナカグロチビナミシャク — Eupithecia daemionata Dietze, 1903
- カメダカバナミシャク — Eupithecia detritata Staudinger, 1897
- クロテンカバナミシャク — Eupithecia emanata Dietze, 1908
- シロマダラカバナミシャク — Eupithecia extensaria leuca Dietze, 1913
- キモンカバナミシャク — Eupithecia flavoapicaria Inoue, 1979
- フジカバナミシャク — Eupithecia fujisana Inoue, 1980
- フトオビヒメナミシャク — Eupithecia gigantea Staudinger, 1897
- グンマカバナミシャク — Eupithecia gummaensis Inoue, 1980
- ウススジヒメカバナミシャク — Eupithecia homogrammata Dietze, 1908
- ミヤマカバナミシャク — Eupithecia impavida Vojnits, 1979
- アミモンカバナミシャク — Eupithecia insigniata insignioides Wehrli, 1923
- クロテンヤスジカバナミシャク — Eupithecia interpunctaria Inoue, 1979
- エゾチビナミシャク — Eupithecia jezonica Matsumura, 1927
- ジンボカバナミシャク — Eupithecia jinboi Inoue, 1976
- チャバネカバナミシャク — Eupithecia kobayashii Inoue, 1958
- ウスイロヤスジカバナミシャク — Eupithecia kurilensis Bryk, 1942
- クロシオカバナミシャク — Eupithecia kuroshio Inoue, 1980
- ホソカバスジナミシャク — Eupithecia lariciata (Freyer, 1842)
- ムネシロテンカバナミシャク — Eupithecia maenamiella Inoue, 1980
- ヤスジカバナミシャク — Eupithecia mandschurica japonica Inoue, 1979
- マスイカバナミシャク — Eupithecia masuii Inoue, 1980
- フタシロスジカバナミシャク — Eupithecia melanolopha Swinhoe, 1895
- ナガイカバナミシャク — Eupithecia nagaii Inoue, 1963
- ミスジカバナミシャク — Eupithecia neosatyrata Inoue, 1979
- マエナミカバナミシャク — Eupithecia niphonaria Leech, 1897
- オオモンカバナミシャク — Eupithecia okadai Inoue, 1958
- ウスカバナミシャク — Eupithecia proterva Butler, 1878
- チャイロカバナミシャク — Eupithecia pseudassimilata Viidalepp & Mironov, 1988
- クロマダラカバナミシャク — Eupithecia pygmaeata (Hübner, [1799])
- セアカカバナミシャク — Eupithecia quadripunctata Warren, 1888
- フタモンカバナミシャク — Eupithecia repentina Vojnits & Laever, 1978
- ムラサキカバナミシャク — Eupithecia rigida Swinhoe, 1892
- ウスアカチビナミシャク — Eupithecia rufescens Butler, 1878
- クニガミカバナミシャク — Eupithecia ryukyuensis Inoue, 1971
- ウラモンウストビナミシャク — Eupithecia scribai Prout, 1938
- オビカバナミシャク — Eupithecia selinata fusei Inoue, 1980
- シコクカバナミシャク — Eupithecia shikokuensis Inoue, 1980
- ソトカバナミシャク — Eupithecia signigera Butler, 1879
- ナカアオナミシャク — Eupithecia sophia Butler, 1878
- シロモンカバナミシャク — Eupithecia spadix Inoue, 1955
- ナカオビカバナミシャク — Eupithecia subbreviata Staudinger, 1897
- アキカバナミシャク — Eupithecia subfumosa Inoue, 1965
- キナミウスグロナミシャク — Eupithecia subfuscata ussuriensis Dietze, 1913
- シロオビカバナミシャク — Eupithecia suboxydata Staudinger, 1897
- ハラキカバナミシャク — Eupithecia subtacincta Hampson, 1895
- スジグロカバナミシャク — Eupithecia supercastigata Inoue, 1958
- ハネナガカバナミシャク — Eupithecia takao Inoue, 1955
- マダラカバスジナミシャク — Eupithecia tantilloides Inoue, 1958
- トシマカバナミシャク — Eupithecia tenuisquama (Warren, 1896)
- イイジマカバナミシャク — Eupithecia thalictrata ijimai Inoue, 1963
- シロテンカバナミシャク — Eupithecia tripunctaria Herrich-Schäffer, 1855
- ツシマカバナミシャク — Eupithecia tsushimensis Inoue, 1980
- アルプスカバナミシャク — Eupithecia veratraria perpaupera Inoue, 1965
- アザミカバナミシャク — Eupithecia virgaureata invisa Butler, 1878
- ヤクシマカバナミシャク — Eupithecia yakushimensis Inoue, 1980
- クロバネカバナミシャク — Eupithecia zibellinata Christoph, 1881
- ナカジマチビナミシャク — Casuariclystis latifascia (Walker, 1866)
- ホソバチビナミシャク — Spiralisigna subpumilata (Inoue, 1972)
- イシガキチビナミシャク — Eriopithex ishigakiensis (Inoue, 1971)
- マルバネチビナミシャク — Gymnoscelis admixtaria (Walker, 1862)
- ウスチャイロチビナミシャク — Gymnoscelis albicaudata Warren, 1897
- オガサワラチビナミシャク — Gymnoscelis boninensis Inoue, 1994
- ウスムラサキチビナミシャク — Gymnoscelis deleta (Hampson, 1891)
- ケブカチビナミシャク — Gymnoscelis esakii Inoue, 1955
- ウラグロチビナミシャク — Gymnoscelis melaninfra Inoue, 1994
- ウラジロチビナミシャク — Gymnoscelis montgomeryi Inoue, 1994
- シタベニチビナミシャク — Gymnoscelis semialbida (Walker, 1866)
- トベラクロスジナミシャク — Gymnoscelis tristrigosa (Butler, 1880)
- ユリカチビナミシャク — Gymnoscelis yurikae Inoue, 2002
- リンゴアオナミシャク — Pasiphila rectangulata (Linnaeus, 1758)
- アトシロモンカバナミシャク — Axinoptera anticostalis Galsworthy, 1999
- クロテンアオナミシャク — Glaucoclystis azumai (Inoue, 1971)
- ミナミチビナミシャク — Glaucoclystis satoi Inoue, 2002
- カギモンチビナミシャク — Glaucoclystis spinosa (Inoue, 1971)
- ヒトスジチビナミシャク — Bosara kadooriensis Galsworthy, 2003
- サキシマチビナミシャク — Chloroclystis atypha Prout, 1958
- クロフウスアオナミシャク — Chloroclystis consueta (Butler, 1879)
- ソトシロオビナミシャク — Chloroclystis excisa (Butler, 1878)
- マダラアオナミシャク — Chloroclystis hypopyrrha West, 1929
- チビアオナミシャク — Chloroclystis kumakurai Inoue, 1958
- アマミアオナミシャク — Chloroclystis neoconversa Inoue, 1971
- ハラアカウスアオナミシャク — Chloroclystis obscura West, 1929
- ウラモンアオナミシャク — Chloroclystis subcinctata Prout, 1915
- テンスジアオナミシャク — Chloroclystis suspiciosa Inoue, 1982
- クロスジアオナミシャク — Chloroclystis v-ata lucinda (Butler, 1879)
- オオサビイロナミシャク — Collix ghosha ghosha Walker, 1862
- テングナミシャク — Collix stellatus Warren, 1894
- トラノオナミシャク — Anticollix sparsatus (Treitschke, 1828)
- アオスジナミシャク — Echthrocollix minutus (Butler, 1881)
- マエフタテンナミシャク — Herbulotia agilata (Christoph, 1881)
- トガリバナミシャク — Horisme stratata (Wileman, 1911)
- アトシロナミシャク — Horisme tersata tetricata (Guenée, 1857)
- ボタンヅルナミシャク — Horisme vitalbata staudingeri Prout, 1938
- サビイロナミシャク — Pseudocollix hyperythrus catalalia (Prout, 1958)
- クロテンサビイロナミシャク — Pseudocollix kawamurai (Inoue, 1972)
- リュウキュウナカジロナミシャク — Melanthia catenaria mesozona Prout, 1939
- ナカジロナミシャク北海道亜種 — Melanthia procellata inexpectata (Warnecke, 1938)
- ナカジロナミシャク本土北海道以外亜種 — Melanthia procellata inquinata (Butler, 1878)
- ナカジロナミシャク奄美亜種 — Melanthia procellata szechuanensis (Wehrli, 1941)
