= Scopula kawabei =

Scientific classification
- Kingdom: Animalia
- Phylum: Arthropoda
- Class: Insecta
- Order: Lepidoptera
- Family: Geometridae
- Genus: Scopula
- Species: S. kawabei

Binomial name
- Scopula kawabei Inoue, 1982

Species of geometer moth in subfamily Sterrhinae

Scopula kawabei is a moth of the family Geometridae. It was described by Hiroshi Inoue in 1982. It is endemic to Japan.
