= Eupithecia ebriosa =

Scientific classification
- Kingdom: Animalia
- Phylum: Arthropoda
- Clade: Pancrustacea
- Class: Insecta
- Order: Lepidoptera
- Family: Geometridae
- Genus: Eupithecia
- Species: E. ebriosa

Binomial name
- Eupithecia ebriosa Vojnits, 1979

Synonyms
- Eupithecia gummaensis Inoue, 1980

Species of moth

Eupithecia ebriosa is a moth in the family Geometridae. It is found from central China to the western Himalayas. In the north, it ranges to Japan.
