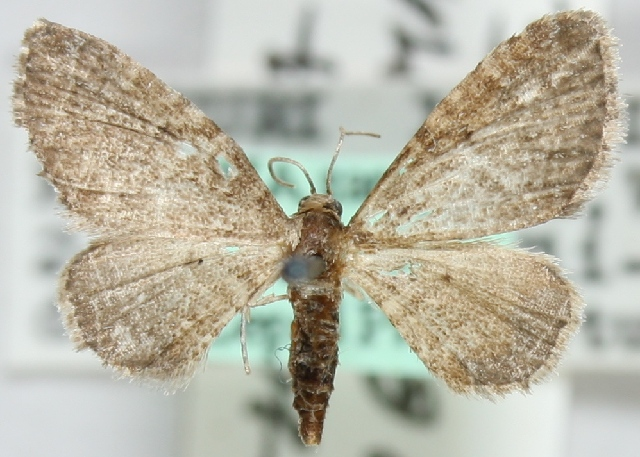

Scientific classification
- Domain: Eukaryota
- Kingdom: Animalia
- Phylum: Arthropoda
- Class: Insecta
- Order: Lepidoptera
- Family: Geometridae
- Genus: Eupithecia
- Species: E. homogrammata

Binomial name
- Eupithecia homogrammata Dietze, 1908

Synonyms
- Eupithecia bicornuta Oh, 1992; Eupithecia meszarosi Vojnits, 1973

= Eupithecia homogrammata =

Species of moth

Eupithecia homogrammata is a moth in the family Geometridae. It is found in Russia, Japan and Korea.

The wingspan is about 12–15 mm.

== Subspecies ==
- Eupithecia homogrammata homogrammata
- Eupithecia homogrammata kamtschatica Viidalepp & Mironov, 1988
