= Scopula superior =

Scientific classification
- Domain: Eukaryota
- Kingdom: Animalia
- Phylum: Arthropoda
- Class: Insecta
- Order: Lepidoptera
- Family: Geometridae
- Genus: Scopula
- Species: S. superior

Binomial name
- Scopula superior (Butler, 1878)

Synonyms
- Asthena superior Butler, 1878; Asthena superior ab. sancta Butler, 1881

Species of geometer moth in subfamily Sterrhinae

Scopula superior is a moth of the family Geometridae. It was described by Arthur Gardiner Butler in 1878. It is found in Japan, the Russian Far East and China.
