= Eupithecia flavoapicaria =

Scientific classification
- Kingdom: Animalia
- Phylum: Arthropoda
- Class: Insecta
- Order: Lepidoptera
- Family: Geometridae
- Genus: Eupithecia
- Species: E. flavoapicaria

Binomial name
- Eupithecia flavoapicaria Inoue, 1979

Synonyms
- Eupithecia mantissa Inoue, 1988

Species of moth

Eupithecia flavoapicaria is a moth in the family Geometridae. It is found in Japan and Taiwan.
