= Eupithecia impavida =

Scientific classification
- Kingdom: Animalia
- Phylum: Arthropoda
- Clade: Pancrustacea
- Class: Insecta
- Order: Lepidoptera
- Family: Geometridae
- Genus: Eupithecia
- Species: E. impavida

Binomial name
- Eupithecia impavida Vojnits, 1979

Synonyms
- Eupithecia secura Vojnits, 1979; Eupithecia commiserenda Vojnits, 1983

Species of moth

Eupithecia impavida is a moth in the family Geometridae. It is widespread, ranging from the western Himalayas through southern and central China to Japan.
