= Scopula confusa =

Scientific classification
- Domain: Eukaryota
- Kingdom: Animalia
- Phylum: Arthropoda
- Class: Insecta
- Order: Lepidoptera
- Family: Geometridae
- Genus: Scopula
- Species: S. confusa

Binomial name
- Scopula confusa (Butler, 1878)

Synonyms
- Asthena confusa Butler, 1878

Species of geometer moth in subfamily Sterrhinae

Scopula confusa is a moth of the family Geometridae. It was described by Arthur Gardiner Butler in 1878. It is found in southern Japan and the Russian Far East.

The wingspan is 27–30 millimetres (1.1–1.2 in).
