= Scopula gilva =

Scientific classification
- Domain: Eukaryota
- Kingdom: Animalia
- Phylum: Arthropoda
- Class: Insecta
- Order: Lepidoptera
- Family: Geometridae
- Genus: Scopula
- Species: S. gilva

Binomial name
- Scopula gilva Sato, 1993

Species of geometer moth in subfamily Sterrhinae

Scopula gilva is a moth of the family Geometridae. It is endemic to Japan.
