= Eupithecia takao =

Scientific classification
- Kingdom: Animalia
- Phylum: Arthropoda
- Class: Insecta
- Order: Lepidoptera
- Family: Geometridae
- Genus: Eupithecia
- Species: E. takao

Binomial name
- Eupithecia takao Inoue, 1955

Species of moth

Eupithecia takao is a moth in the family Geometridae. It is found in Japan and Russia.
