= Eupithecia shikokuensis =

Scientific classification
- Kingdom: Animalia
- Phylum: Arthropoda
- Class: Insecta
- Order: Lepidoptera
- Family: Geometridae
- Genus: Eupithecia
- Species: E. shikokuensis

Binomial name
- Eupithecia shikokuensis Inoue, 1980

Species of moth

Eupithecia shikokuensis is a moth in the family Geometridae. It is found in Japan.
