= Eupithecia emanata =

Scientific classification
- Domain: Eukaryota
- Kingdom: Animalia
- Phylum: Arthropoda
- Class: Insecta
- Order: Lepidoptera
- Family: Geometridae
- Genus: Eupithecia
- Species: E. emanata

Binomial name
- Eupithecia emanata Dietze, 1908

Synonyms
- Eupithecia korbi Dietze, 1908 (not Dietze, 1910); Eupithecia sordidata Wileman, 1911; Eupithecia subicterata Prout, 1930

Species of moth

Eupithecia emanata is a moth in the family Geometridae. It is found in the Russian Far East, on the Kuriles and in Japan.

The wingspan is about 15–21 mm.
