= Scopula prouti =

Scientific classification
- Domain: Eukaryota
- Kingdom: Animalia
- Phylum: Arthropoda
- Class: Insecta
- Order: Lepidoptera
- Family: Geometridae
- Genus: Scopula
- Species: S. prouti

Binomial name
- Scopula prouti Djakonov, 1935

Species of geometer moth in subfamily Sterrhinae

Scopula prouti is a moth of the family Geometridae. It is found from north-eastern China to Korea, Japan and south-eastern Russia.

== Subspecies ==
- Scopula prouti prouti
- Scopula prouti kurilula Bryk, 1942
