= Eupithecia niphonaria =

Scientific classification
- Domain: Eukaryota
- Kingdom: Animalia
- Phylum: Arthropoda
- Class: Insecta
- Order: Lepidoptera
- Family: Geometridae
- Genus: Eupithecia
- Species: E. niphonaria

Binomial name
- Eupithecia niphonaria Leech, 1897

Synonyms
- Eupithecia corticosa Prout, 1914; Eupithecia draudti Dietze, 1913; Eupithecia maenamii Inoue, 1965

Species of moth

Eupithecia niphonaria is a moth in the family Geometridae. It is found in Japan and Korea.

The wingspan is 18–21 mm. Adults are on wing in April.

The larvae feed on Quercus phillyraeoides.
