= Eupithecia tantilloides =

Scientific classification
- Kingdom: Animalia
- Phylum: Arthropoda
- Class: Insecta
- Order: Lepidoptera
- Family: Geometridae
- Genus: Eupithecia
- Species: E. tantilloides

Binomial name
- Eupithecia tantilloides Inoue, 1958

Species of moth

Eupithecia tantilloides is a moth in the family Geometridae first described by Hiroshi Inoue in 1958. It is found on the Kuriles and in Japan.

The wingspan is about 16–17 mm.
