= Scopula superciliata =

Scientific classification
- Kingdom: Animalia
- Phylum: Arthropoda
- Clade: Pancrustacea
- Class: Insecta
- Order: Lepidoptera
- Family: Geometridae
- Genus: Scopula
- Species: S. superciliata

Binomial name
- Scopula superciliata (Prout, 1913)

Synonyms
- Acidalia superciliata Prout, 1913

Species of geometer moth in subfamily Sterrhinae

Scopula superciliata is a moth of the family Geometridae. It was described by Prout in 1913. It is endemic to Japan.
