= Scopula plumbearia =

Scientific classification
- Domain: Eukaryota
- Kingdom: Animalia
- Phylum: Arthropoda
- Class: Insecta
- Order: Lepidoptera
- Family: Geometridae
- Genus: Scopula
- Species: S. plumbearia

Binomial name
- Scopula plumbearia (Leech, 1891)

Synonyms
- Acidalia plumbearia Leech, 1891

Species of geometer moth in subfamily Sterrhinae

Scopula plumbearia is a moth of the family Geometridae. It is found in Japan.

The wingspan is 19–21 mm.
