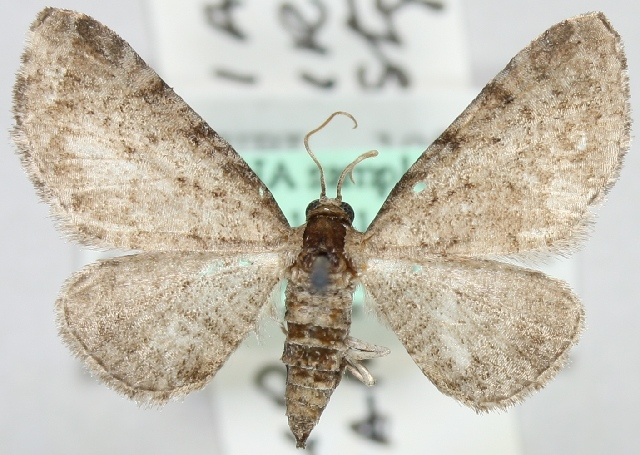

Scientific classification
- Domain: Eukaryota
- Kingdom: Animalia
- Phylum: Arthropoda
- Class: Insecta
- Order: Lepidoptera
- Family: Geometridae
- Genus: Eupithecia
- Species: E. mandschurica

Binomial name
- Eupithecia mandschurica Staudinger, 1897

Synonyms
- Eupithecia korbi Dietze, 1910

= Eupithecia mandschurica =

Species of moth

Eupithecia mandschurica is a moth in the family Geometridae. It is found in Russia (Amur) and Japan.

== Subspecies ==
- Eupithecia mandschurica mandschurica
- Eupithecia mandschurica japonica Inoue, 1979 (Japan)
