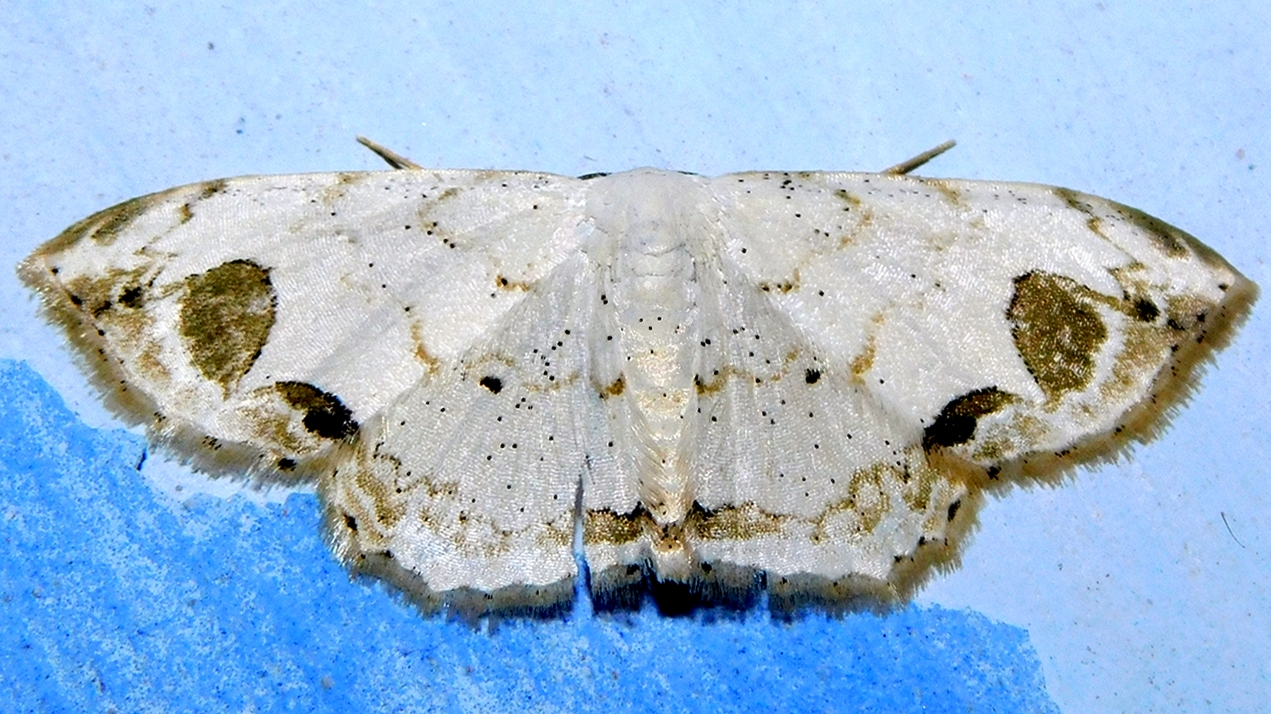

Scientific classification
- Domain: Eukaryota
- Kingdom: Animalia
- Phylum: Arthropoda
- Class: Insecta
- Order: Lepidoptera
- Family: Geometridae
- Genus: Scopula
- Species: S. butleri

Binomial name
- Scopula butleri (Prout, 1913)

Synonyms
- Acidalia butleri Prout, 1913; Craspedia insolata Butler, 1889 (preocc. Felder & Rogenhofer, 1875); Acidalia satsumaria Leech, 1897

= Scopula butleri =

Species of geometer moth in subfamily Sterrhinae

Scopula butleri is a moth of the family Geometridae. It was described by Prout in 1913. It is found in the north-eastern Himalaya, Sumatra, China, Japan and Borneo. The habitat consists of lowland forests and lower montane forests.

The length of the forewings is 7–8 mm.

== Subspecies ==
- Scopula butleri butleri (north-eastern Himalaya, Sumatra, China, Japan)
- Scopula butleri aequibrachiata Holloway, 1997 (Borneo)
