= Scopula indicataria =

Scientific classification
- Kingdom: Animalia
- Phylum: Arthropoda
- Class: Insecta
- Order: Lepidoptera
- Family: Geometridae
- Genus: Scopula
- Species: S. indicataria

Binomial name
- Scopula indicataria (Walker, 1861)

Synonyms
- Argyris indicataria Walker, 1861; Somatina indicataria; Somatina morata Prout, 1938; Somatina sufflava Prout, 1938

Species of geometer moth in subfamily Sterrhinae

Scopula indicataria is a moth of the family Geometridae. It is found in China, Korea, Japan and Russia.

== Subspecies ==
- Scopula indicataria indicataria (eastern and southern China)
- Scopula indicataria sufflava (Prout, 1938) (northern and north-eastern China to Korea, Japan and Russia: Amur, Primorye)
- Scopula indicataria morata (Prout, 1938) (Japan)
