= Eupithecia sophia =

Scientific classification
- Domain: Eukaryota
- Kingdom: Animalia
- Phylum: Arthropoda
- Class: Insecta
- Order: Lepidoptera
- Family: Geometridae
- Genus: Eupithecia
- Species: E. sophia

Binomial name
- Eupithecia sophia Butler, 1878

Synonyms
- Eupithecia sophia ab. simplex Dietze, 1910; Eupithecia sophia ab. griseipars Prout, 1938

Species of moth

Eupithecia sophia is a moth in the family Geometridae first described by Arthur Gardiner Butler in 1878. It is found on the Kuriles, in Japan, Korea and western China.

The wingspan is 13–14 mm.
