= Scopula michinoku =

Scientific classification
- Domain: Eukaryota
- Kingdom: Animalia
- Phylum: Arthropoda
- Class: Insecta
- Order: Lepidoptera
- Family: Geometridae
- Genus: Scopula
- Species: S. michinoku

Binomial name
- Scopula michinoku Sato, 1994

Species of geometer moth in subfamily Sterrhinae

Scopula michinoku is a moth of the family Geometridae. It is found in Honshu, Japan.
