= Eupithecia ryukyuensis =

Scientific classification
- Kingdom: Animalia
- Phylum: Arthropoda
- Class: Insecta
- Order: Lepidoptera
- Family: Geometridae
- Genus: Eupithecia
- Species: E. ryukyuensis

Binomial name
- Eupithecia ryukyuensis Inoue, 1971

Species of moth

Eupithecia ryukyuensis is a moth in the family Geometridae. It is found in Japan.
