= Scopula tenuisocius =

Scientific classification
- Kingdom: Animalia
- Phylum: Arthropoda
- Class: Insecta
- Order: Lepidoptera
- Family: Geometridae
- Genus: Scopula
- Species: S. tenuisocius

Binomial name
- Scopula tenuisocius Inoue, 1942

Species of geometer moth in subfamily Sterrhinae

Scopula tenuisocius is a moth of the family Geometridae. It is found in Japan, the Russian Far East, and the Kuril Islands. It was described by Hiroshi Inoue in 1942.

The wingspan of this species is 22–26 mm.
