= Eupithecia subbreviata =

Scientific classification
- Domain: Eukaryota
- Kingdom: Animalia
- Phylum: Arthropoda
- Class: Insecta
- Order: Lepidoptera
- Family: Geometridae
- Genus: Eupithecia
- Species: E. subbreviata

Binomial name
- Eupithecia subbreviata Staudinger, 1897

Species of moth

Eupithecia subbreviata is a moth in the family Geometridae. It is found in Russia (Amur), Japan and Korea.

The wingspan is about 19–22 mm. The forewings are marked with brownish black. Adults have been recorded on wing from March to May. There is one generation per year.
