= Scopula hanna =

Scientific classification
- Domain: Eukaryota
- Kingdom: Animalia
- Phylum: Arthropoda
- Class: Insecta
- Order: Lepidoptera
- Family: Geometridae
- Genus: Scopula
- Species: S. hanna

Binomial name
- Scopula hanna (Butler, 1878)

Synonyms
- Acidalia hanna Butler, 1878

Species of geometer moth in subfamily Sterrhinae

Scopula hanna is a moth of the family Geometridae. It is found in Japan.
