= Eupithecia scribai =

Scientific classification
- Kingdom: Animalia
- Phylum: Arthropoda
- Clade: Pancrustacea
- Class: Insecta
- Order: Lepidoptera
- Family: Geometridae
- Genus: Eupithecia
- Species: E. scribai

Binomial name
- Eupithecia scribai Prout, 1939

Species of moth

Eupithecia scribai is a moth in the family Geometridae. It is found in the Russian Far East, Japan and Korea.

The wingspan is about 16 mm for males and 21 mm for females. The wings are light brown.
