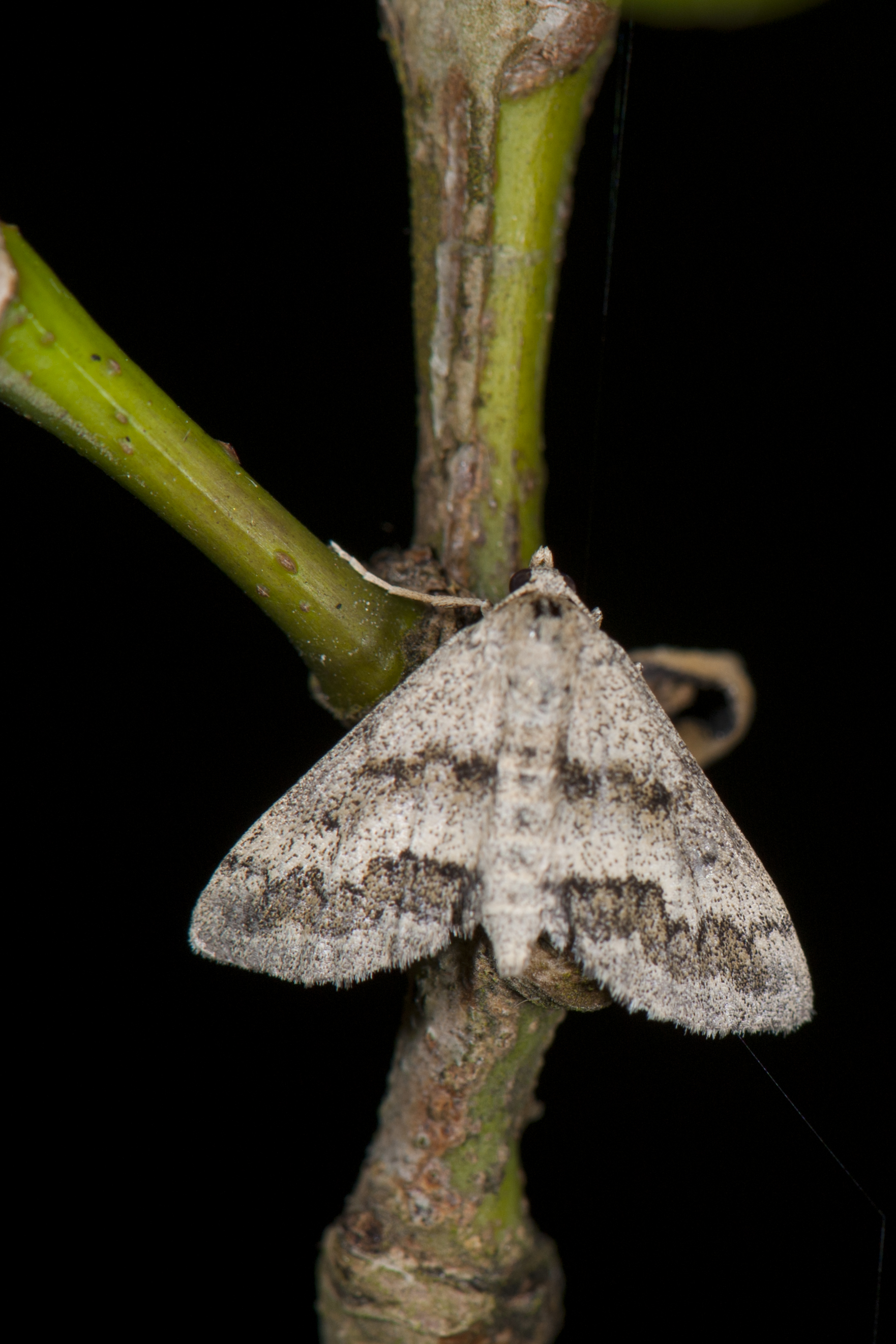

Scientific classification
- Domain: Eukaryota
- Kingdom: Animalia
- Phylum: Arthropoda
- Class: Insecta
- Order: Lepidoptera
- Family: Geometridae
- Genus: Scopula
- Species: S. pinguis

Binomial name
- Scopula pinguis (C. Swinhoe, 1902)

Synonyms
- Emmiltis pinguis C. Swinhoe, 1902; Antilycauges pinguis

= Scopula pinguis =

Species of geometer moth in subfamily Sterrhinae

Scopula pinguis is a moth of the family Geometridae first described by Charles Swinhoe in 1902. It is found in Korea, Japan and Taiwan.
