= Scopula cineraria =

Scientific classification
- Domain: Eukaryota
- Kingdom: Animalia
- Phylum: Arthropoda
- Class: Insecta
- Order: Lepidoptera
- Family: Geometridae
- Genus: Scopula
- Species: S. cineraria

Binomial name
- Scopula cineraria (Leech, 1897)

Synonyms
- Acidalia cineraria Leech, 1897

Species of geometer moth in subfamily Sterrhinae

Scopula cineraria is a moth of the family Geometridae. It is endemic to Japan.

The wingspan is 20–25 millimetres (0.79–0.98 in).
