= Eupithecia pseudassimilata =

Scientific classification
- Kingdom: Animalia
- Phylum: Arthropoda
- Clade: Pancrustacea
- Class: Insecta
- Order: Lepidoptera
- Family: Geometridae
- Genus: Eupithecia
- Species: E. pseudassimilata

Binomial name
- Eupithecia pseudassimilata Viidalepp & Mironov, 1988

Species of moth

Eupithecia pseudassimilata is a moth in the family Geometridae. It is found in Russia and Japan.
