= Scopula coniaria =

Scientific classification
- Domain: Eukaryota
- Kingdom: Animalia
- Phylum: Arthropoda
- Class: Insecta
- Order: Lepidoptera
- Family: Geometridae
- Genus: Scopula
- Species: S. coniaria

Binomial name
- Scopula coniaria (Prout, 1913)

Synonyms
- Acidalia coniaria Prout, 1913; Acidalia pulveraria Leech, 1897 (preocc. Snellen, 1872)

Species of geometer moth in subfamily Sterrhinae

Scopula coniaria is a moth of the family Geometridae. It was described by Prout in 1913. It is found in Japan and Russia.

The wingspan is 20–24 millimetres (0.79–0.94 in).

== Subspecies ==
- Scopula coniaria coniaria
- Scopula coniaria okinawensis Prout, 1920 (Okinawa)
