= Scopula takao =

Scientific classification
- Kingdom: Animalia
- Phylum: Arthropoda
- Class: Insecta
- Order: Lepidoptera
- Family: Geometridae
- Genus: Scopula
- Species: S. takao

Binomial name
- Scopula takao Inoue, 1954

Species of geometer moth in subfamily Sterrhinae

Scopula takao is a moth of the family Geometridae. It is found in Japan.

The wingspan is 17–25 mm.
