= Scopula pudicaria =

Scientific classification
- Domain: Eukaryota
- Kingdom: Animalia
- Phylum: Arthropoda
- Class: Insecta
- Order: Lepidoptera
- Family: Geometridae
- Genus: Scopula
- Species: S. pudicaria

Binomial name
- Scopula pudicaria (Motschulsky, 1861)

Synonyms
- Cabera pudicaria Motschulsky 1861

Species of geometer moth in subfamily Sterrhinae

Scopula pudicaria is a moth in the family Geometridae. It is found from north-eastern China to south-eastern Russia, Korea and Japan.
