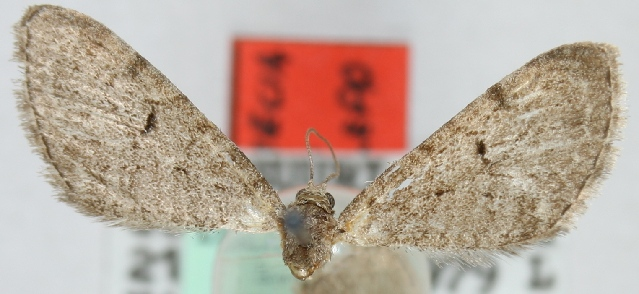
- Eupithecia amplicornuta, now considered a synonym of Eupithecia detritata

Scientific classification
- Domain: Eukaryota
- Kingdom: Animalia
- Phylum: Arthropoda
- Class: Insecta
- Order: Lepidoptera
- Family: Geometridae
- Genus: Eupithecia
- Species: E. detritata

Binomial name
- Eupithecia detritata Staudinger, 1897

Synonyms
- Eupithecia amplicornuta Viidalepp & Mironov, 1988; Eupithecia kamedai Inoue, 1987

= Eupithecia detritata =

Species of moth

Eupithecia detritata is a moth in the family Geometridae. It is found in the Russian Far East, Japan and Korea.

The wingspan is about 22 mm. The ground colour of the wings is greyish.
