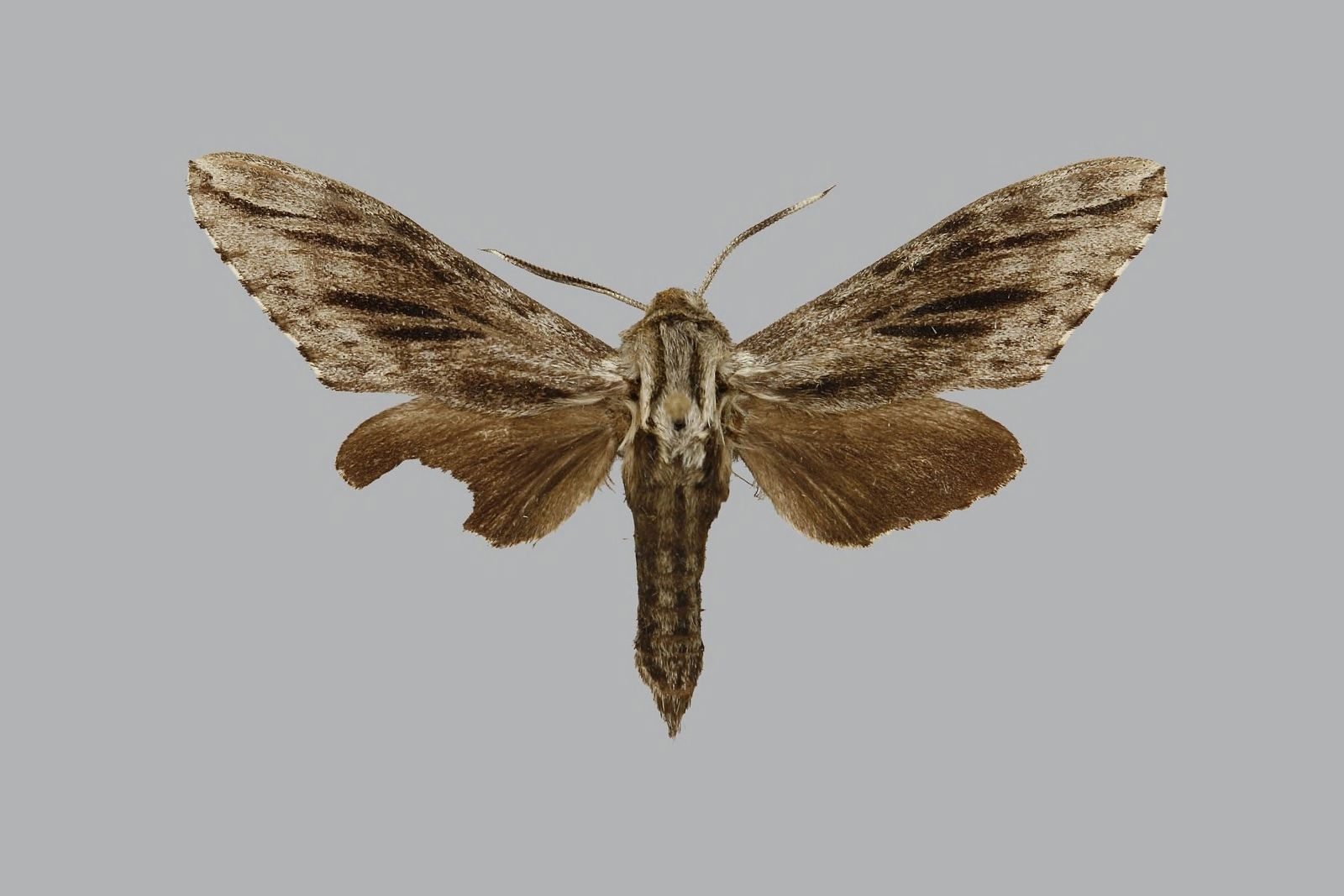

Scientific classification
- Domain: Eukaryota
- Kingdom: Animalia
- Phylum: Arthropoda
- Class: Insecta
- Order: Lepidoptera
- Family: Sphingidae
- Genus: Sphinx
- Species: S. crassistriga

Binomial name
- Sphinx crassistriga (Rothschild & Jordan, 1903)

Synonyms
- Hyloicus crassistriga Rothschild & Jordan, 1903

= Sphinx crassistriga =

Species of moth

Sphinx crassistriga is a moth of the family Sphingidae. It is known from Japan.

The length of the forewings is about 38 mm. The upperside of the body is pale brown, while the underside of the body is cinnamon brown. The forewing upperside is wood brown with brownish black markings and the underside of both wings is somewhat greyish brown. The hindwing upperside is brown.

== Subspecies ==
- Sphinx crassistriga crassistriga (Honshu in Japan)
- Sphinx crassistriga aino Kishida, 1990 (Hokkaido in Japan)
