= Eupithecia daemionata =

Scientific classification
- Domain: Eukaryota
- Kingdom: Animalia
- Phylum: Arthropoda
- Class: Insecta
- Order: Lepidoptera
- Family: Geometridae
- Genus: Eupithecia
- Species: E. daemionata

Binomial name
- Eupithecia daemionata Dietze, 1903

Synonyms
- Eupithecia daemoniata; Eupithecia accessata Dietze, 1910

Species of moth

Eupithecia daemionata is a moth in the family Geometridae. It is found in Russia, Japan and Taiwan.
