= Scopula ichinosawana =

Scientific classification
- Kingdom: Animalia
- Phylum: Arthropoda
- Clade: Pancrustacea
- Class: Insecta
- Order: Lepidoptera
- Family: Geometridae
- Genus: Scopula
- Species: S. ichinosawana

Binomial name
- Scopula ichinosawana (Matsumura, 1925)

Synonyms
- Acidalia ichinosawana Matsumura, 1925

Species of geometer moth in subfamily Sterrhinae

Scopula ichinosawana is a moth of the family Geometridae. It is found in Japan and Russia.

The wingspan is 20–25 mm.

== Subspecies ==
- Scopula ichinosawana ichinosawana
- Scopula ichinosawana honshuensis Inoue, 1982
