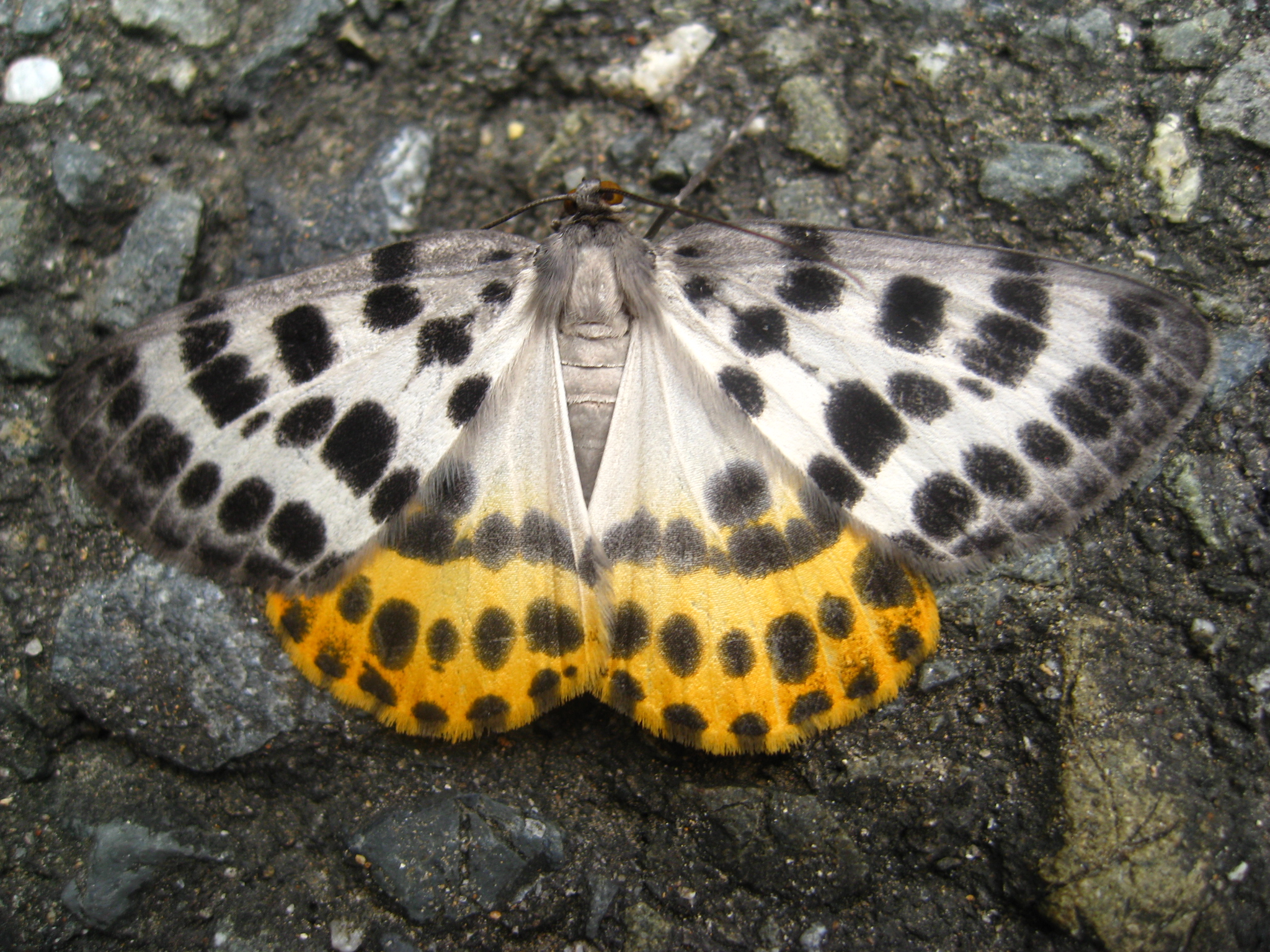

Scientific classification
- Domain: Eukaryota
- Kingdom: Animalia
- Phylum: Arthropoda
- Class: Insecta
- Order: Lepidoptera
- Family: Geometridae
- Subfamily: Ennominae
- Tribe: Boarmiini
- Genus: Arichanna
- Species: A. gaschkevitchii

Binomial name
- Arichanna gaschkevitchii Motschulsky, 1860

= Arichanna gaschkevitchii =

Species of moth

Arichanna gaschkevitchii (or hyoumonedashaku (ヒョウモンエダシャク) in Japanese) is a species of geometrid moth native to Japan and commonly found throughout the country. The adult's wingspan can reach a length of 40–50 millimetres (1.6–2.0 in). This moth will store large amounts of grayanotoxins from the larval host plant in the body tissue to deter predators. The species was first described by Victor Motschulsky in 1860.
