= Hydrelia shioyana =

Scientific classification
- Kingdom: Animalia
- Phylum: Arthropoda
- Clade: Pancrustacea
- Class: Insecta
- Order: Lepidoptera
- Family: Geometridae
- Genus: Hydrelia
- Species: H. shioyana

Binomial name
- Hydrelia shioyana (Matsumura, 1927)

Synonyms
- Acidalia shioyana Matsumura, 1927; Hydrelia adesma Prout, 1930

Species of moth

Hydrelia shioyana is a moth in the family Geometridae first described by Shōnen Matsumura in 1927. It is found in Japan and Russia.

The wingspan is 13–16 mm.
