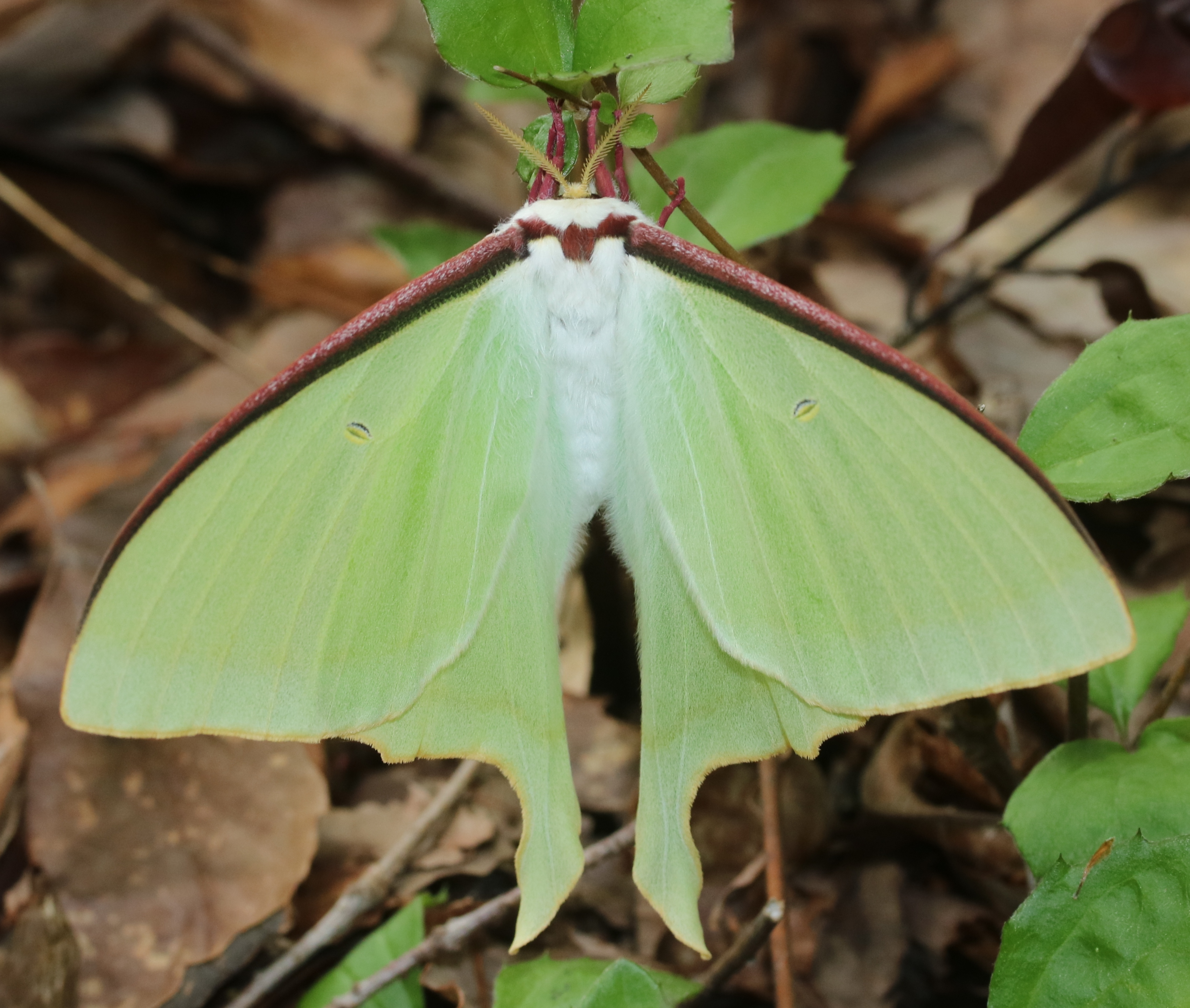

Scientific classification
- Kingdom: Animalia
- Phylum: Arthropoda
- Class: Insecta
- Order: Lepidoptera
- Family: Saturniidae
- Genus: Actias
- Species: A. aliena

Binomial name
- Actias aliena (Butler, 1879)

Synonyms
- Tropaea aliena Butler, 1879

= Actias aliena =

Species of moth

Actias aliena is a moth in the family Saturniidae. It is a large silk moth with a wingspan ranging from 100–110 mm. It is found in Japan. Its mitochondrial genome has been sequenced. Their mitochondrial genome is 15,243 bp (base pairs) long.

== Subspecies ==
- Actias aliena aliena (Butler, 1879)
- Actias aliena sjoeqvisti Bryk, 1949

== Gallery ==
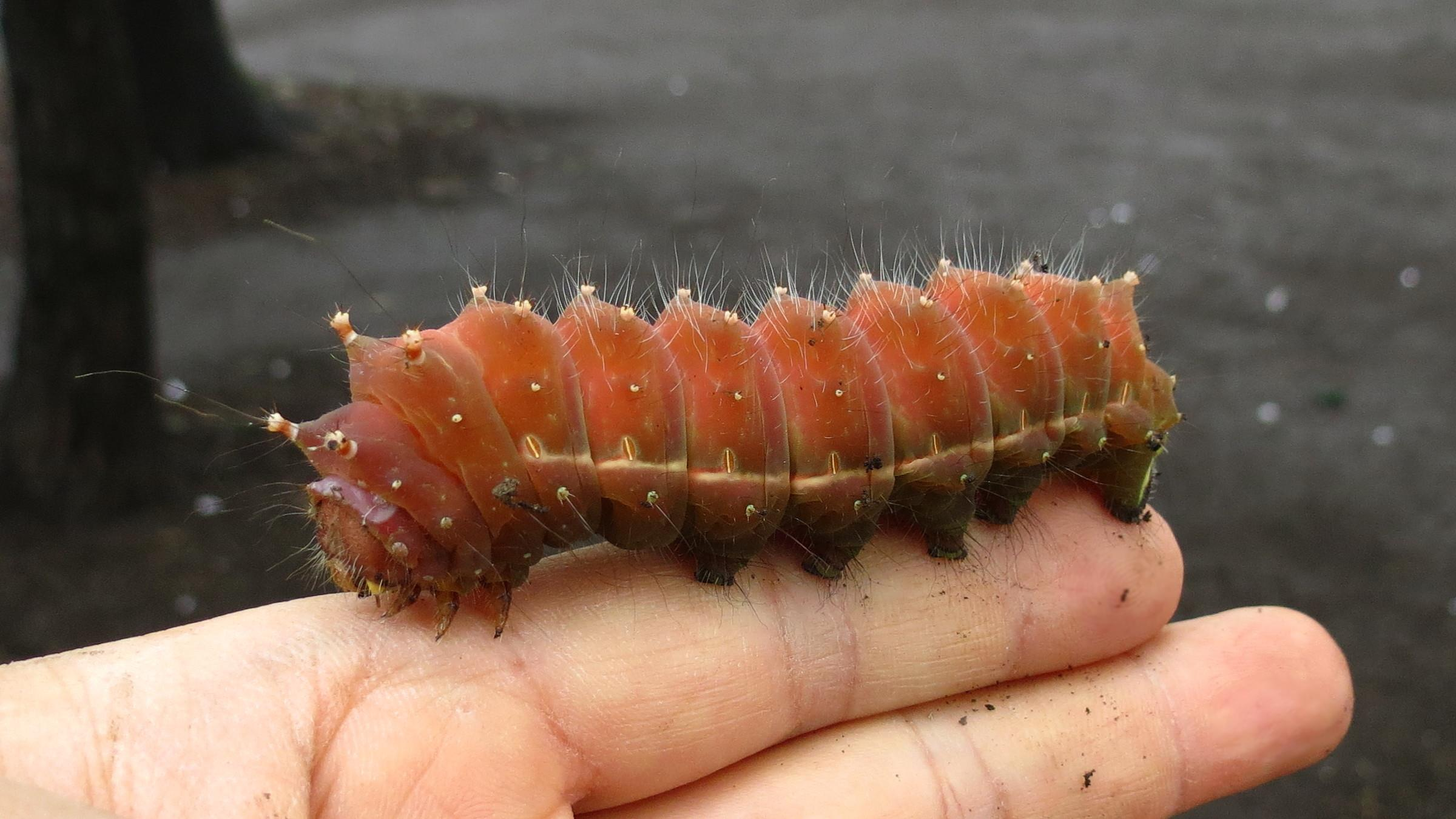
Larva (color of the body just before the pupal stage)
