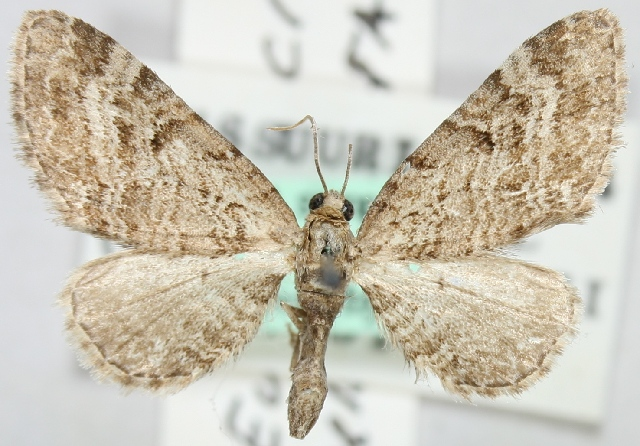

Scientific classification
- Domain: Eukaryota
- Kingdom: Animalia
- Phylum: Arthropoda
- Class: Insecta
- Order: Lepidoptera
- Family: Geometridae
- Genus: Eupithecia
- Species: E. suboxydata

Binomial name
- Eupithecia suboxydata Staudinger, 1897

= Eupithecia suboxydata =

Species of moth

Eupithecia suboxydata is a moth in the family Geometridae. It is found in the eastern Palearctic realm, west to south-eastern Russia and the southern Urals.
