= Eupithecia okadai =

Scientific classification
- Kingdom: Animalia
- Phylum: Arthropoda
- Class: Insecta
- Order: Lepidoptera
- Family: Geometridae
- Genus: Eupithecia
- Species: E. okadai

Binomial name
- Eupithecia okadai Inoue, 1958

Species of moth

Eupithecia okadai is a moth in the family Geometridae. It is found in Japan and Korea.

The wingspan is about 20 mm. The wings are greyish white.

The larvae feed within the cones of Symplocos chinensis.
