= Eupithecia costiconvexa =

Scientific classification
- Kingdom: Animalia
- Phylum: Arthropoda
- Class: Insecta
- Order: Lepidoptera
- Family: Geometridae
- Genus: Eupithecia
- Species: E. costiconvexa

Binomial name
- Eupithecia costiconvexa Inoue, 1979

Species of moth

Eupithecia costiconvexa is a moth in the family Geometridae. It is found in Japan (Honshu, Shikoku, Kyushu, Tsushima, Yakushima) and Thailand.
