= Scopula longicerata =

Scientific classification
- Kingdom: Animalia
- Phylum: Arthropoda
- Class: Insecta
- Order: Lepidoptera
- Family: Geometridae
- Genus: Scopula
- Species: S. longicerata

Binomial name
- Scopula longicerata Inoue, 1955

Species of geometer moth in subfamily Sterrhinae

Scopula longicerata is a moth of the family Geometridae. It was described by Hiroshi Inoue in 1955. It is endemic to Japan.
