= Scopula anisopleura =

Scientific classification
- Kingdom: Animalia
- Phylum: Arthropoda
- Class: Insecta
- Order: Lepidoptera
- Family: Geometridae
- Genus: Scopula
- Species: S. anisopleura

Binomial name
- Scopula anisopleura Inoue, 1982

Synonyms
- Scopula perlineata Schaus, 1913 (preocc. Walker)

Species of geometer moth in subfamily Sterrhinae

Scopula anisopleura is a moth of the family Geometridae. It was described by Hiroshi Inoue in 1982. It is endemic to Japan.
