= Scopula nupta =

Scientific classification
- Kingdom: Animalia
- Phylum: Arthropoda
- Class: Insecta
- Order: Lepidoptera
- Family: Geometridae
- Genus: Scopula
- Species: S. nupta

Binomial name
- Scopula nupta (Butler, 1878)

Synonyms
- Asthena nupta Butler, 1878; Scopula analogia Inoue, 1954; Scopula seminupta Sterneck, 1941

Species of geometer moth in subfamily Sterrhinae

Scopula nupta is a moth of the family Geometridae. It was described by Arthur Gardiner Butler in 1878. It is found in Japan (Hokkaido, Honshu), Hong Kong, Korea, and the Russian Far East.

The wingspan is 17–24 mm (0.67–0.94 in).
