= Eupithecia tenuisquama =

Scientific classification
- Kingdom: Animalia
- Phylum: Arthropoda
- Class: Insecta
- Order: Lepidoptera
- Family: Geometridae
- Genus: Eupithecia
- Species: E. tenuisquama

Binomial name
- Eupithecia tenuisquama (Warren, 1896)

Synonyms
- Tephroclysta tenuisquama Warren, 1896; Eupithecia toshimai Inoue, 1980

Species of moth

Eupithecia tenuisquama is a moth in the family Geometridae. It is a widespread species, ranging from the Himalaya to Japan.
