= Scopula semignobilis =

Scientific classification
- Kingdom: Animalia
- Phylum: Arthropoda
- Class: Insecta
- Order: Lepidoptera
- Family: Geometridae
- Genus: Scopula
- Species: S. semignobilis

Binomial name
- Scopula semignobilis Inoue, 1942

Species of geometer moth in subfamily Sterrhinae

Scopula semignobilis is a moth of the family Geometridae. It was described by Hiroshi Inoue in 1942. It is found in Japan, Korea, and the Russian Far East.

The wingspan is 19–21 mm (0.75–0.83 in).
