= Scopula ignobilis =

Scientific classification
- Kingdom: Animalia
- Phylum: Arthropoda
- Class: Insecta
- Order: Lepidoptera
- Family: Geometridae
- Genus: Scopula
- Species: S. ignobilis

Binomial name
- Scopula ignobilis (Warren, 1901)

Synonyms
- Craspedia ignobilis Warren, 1901

Species of geometer moth in subfamily Sterrhinae

Scopula ignobilis is a moth of the family Geometridae. It is found in Japan, Russia, Korea, Taiwan and China.

The wingspan is 20–32 mm (0.79–1.26 in).
