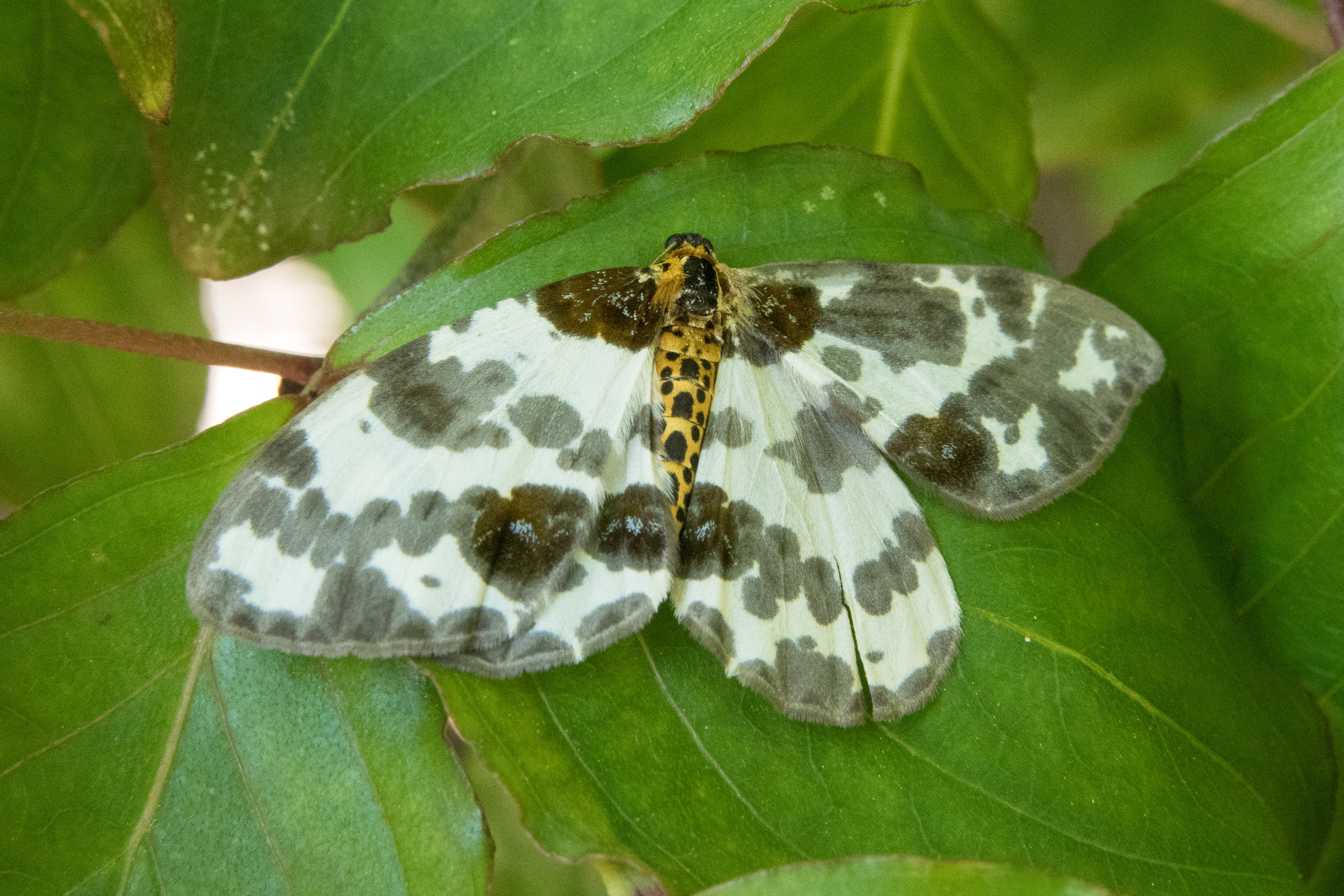

Scientific classification
- Kingdom: Animalia
- Phylum: Arthropoda
- Clade: Pancrustacea
- Class: Insecta
- Order: Lepidoptera
- Family: Geometridae
- Genus: Abraxas
- Species: A. miranda

Binomial name
- Abraxas miranda Butler, 1878

Synonyms
- Abraxas deminuta Warren, 1894

= Abraxas miranda =

Species of moth

Abraxas miranda is a species of moth belonging to the family Geometridae. It was described by Arthur Gardiner Butler in 1878. It is known from Japan.

The wingspan is 18–26 mm.

== Subspecies ==
- Abraxas miranda miranda
- Abraxas miranda aesia Prout, 1925
