= Eupithecia aritai =

Scientific classification
- Kingdom: Animalia
- Phylum: Arthropoda
- Class: Insecta
- Order: Lepidoptera
- Family: Geometridae
- Genus: Eupithecia
- Species: E. aritai

Binomial name
- Eupithecia aritai Inoue, 1977

Species of moth

Eupithecia aritai is a moth in the family Geometridae. It is found in Argentina.
