= Eupithecia zibellinata =

Scientific classification
- Domain: Eukaryota
- Kingdom: Animalia
- Phylum: Arthropoda
- Class: Insecta
- Order: Lepidoptera
- Family: Geometridae
- Genus: Eupithecia
- Species: E. zibellinata

Binomial name
- Eupithecia zibellinata Christoph, 1880

Synonyms
- Eupithecia caliginea zibellinata; Tephroclystis zibellinata

Species of moth

Eupithecia zibellinata is a moth in the family Geometridae. It is found in Russia (Amur) and Japan.
