= Eupithecia kurilensis =

Scientific classification
- Kingdom: Animalia
- Phylum: Arthropoda
- Class: Insecta
- Order: Lepidoptera
- Family: Geometridae
- Genus: Eupithecia
- Species: E. kurilensis

Binomial name
- Eupithecia kurilensis Bryk, 1942

Synonyms
- Eupithecia angustipunctaria Inoue, 1979

Species of moth

Eupithecia kurilensis is a moth in the family Geometridae. It is found on the Kamchatka Peninsula and the Kuriles and in Japan.

The wingspan is about 20–25 mm.

== Subspecies ==
- Eupithecia kurilensis kurilensis
- Eupithecia kurilensis mironovi Beljaev, 2002 (Kamchatka Peninsula)
