= Scopula duplinupta =

Scientific classification
- Kingdom: Animalia
- Phylum: Arthropoda
- Class: Insecta
- Order: Lepidoptera
- Family: Geometridae
- Genus: Scopula
- Species: S. duplinupta

Binomial name
- Scopula duplinupta Inoue, 1982

Species of geometer moth in subfamily Sterrhinae

Scopula duplinupta is a moth of the family Geometridae. It is found in South Africa.

The wingspan is 24–29 mm.
