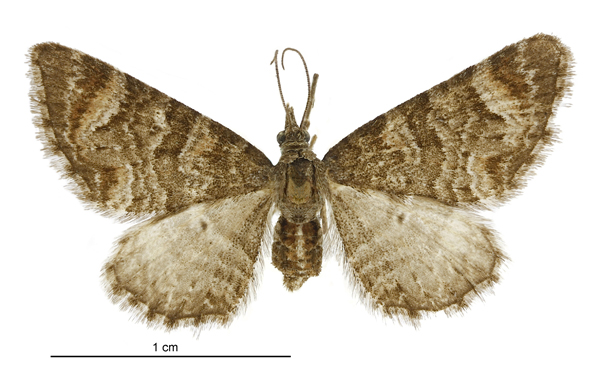
- Female specimen
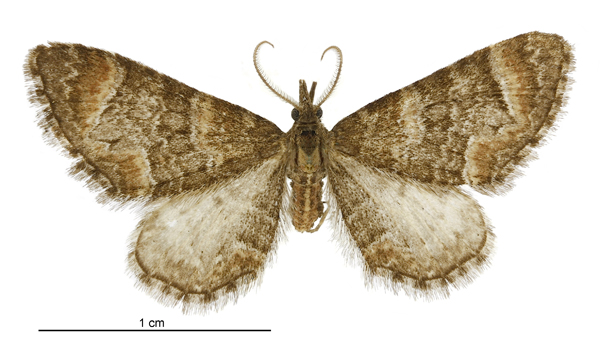
- Male specimen

Scientific classification
- Kingdom: Animalia
- Phylum: Arthropoda
- Clade: Pancrustacea
- Class: Insecta
- Order: Lepidoptera
- Family: Geometridae
- Genus: Pasiphila
- Species: P. erratica

Binomial name
- Pasiphila erratica (Philpott, 1916)

Synonyms
- Chloroclystis erratica Philpott, 1916

= Pasiphila erratica =

Species of insect endemic to New Zealand

Pasiphila erratica is a moth of the family Geometridae. It was first described by Alfred Philpott in 1916. This species is endemic to New Zealand and can be found in the Otago and Southland regions. Adults are on the wing from November until January.

== Taxonomy ==
This species was first described by Alfred Philpott in 1916 using specimens collected at Bold Peak, in the Humboldt Ranges, and at Mount Cleughearn in the Hunter Mountains in the South Island. Philpott originally named the species Chloroclystis erratica. George Hudson discussed and illustrated this species under that name in his 1928 publication The butterflies and moths of New Zealand. In 1971 John S. Dugdale placed this species in the genus Pasiphila. The male holotype, collected at Mount Cleughearn, Hunter Mountains is held at the New Zealand Arthropod Collection.

== Description ==
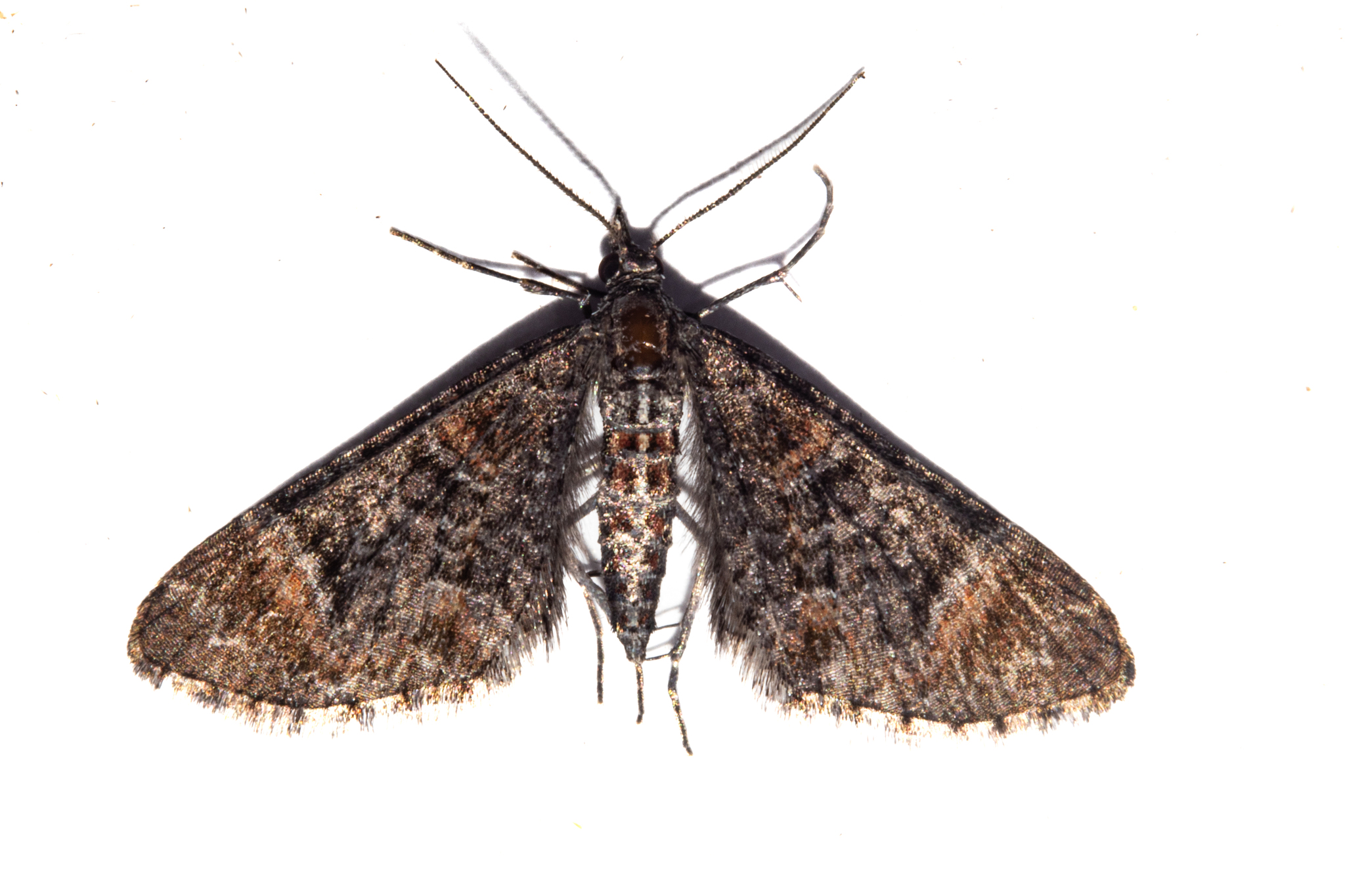
Living specimen of P. erratica

Philpott described the adults of this species as follows:

♂♀. 19-23 mm. Head and palpi fuscous mixed with greyish. Palpi, 2 1/4. Antennae in ♂fasciculate-ciliate, ciliations 3 1/2. Thorax grey-fuscous with broad central stripe reddish-brown. Abdomen reddish-brown sprinkled with fuscous and grey, sides fuscous. Forewings elongate-triangular, termen obliquely bowed, greyish-fuscous; a curved grey fascia near base, often obscure; median band limited anteriorly by curved grey fascia slightly indented below middle and margined more or less with blackish on both sides; preceding this a parallel, suffused, reddish-brown fascia; 3 or 4thin waved grey fasciae in posterior portion of median band; posterior margin of median band from 2/3 costa to 4/5 dorsum, outwardly oblique to near middle of termen, thence abruptly bent inwards for about half the breadth of band and from vein 2 almost right-angled to dorsum; a rather broad fascia of reddish-brown parallel to median band, paler anteriorly and sometimes traversed by a thin darker line; a thin serrate grey subterminal line, close to termen on lower half; a black line round termen : cilia fuscous-grey, obscurely barred with black. Hindwings, termen unevenly rounded; fuscous-grey; numerous lighter and darker fasciae from dorsum and a broader reddish-brown shade before termen; a strong black terminal line : cilia as in forewings, but paler.

This species has a dark central fascia with reddish colouration on each side. This, along with the sharp angulation of the postmedian line, ensures it can be distinguished from other species in the genus.

== Distribution ==
This species is endemic to New Zealand. It has been observed in the Southland and Otago regions.

== Habitat and hosts ==
This species is said to be associated with Veronica odora.

== Behaviour ==
Adults of this species are on the wing from November until January.
