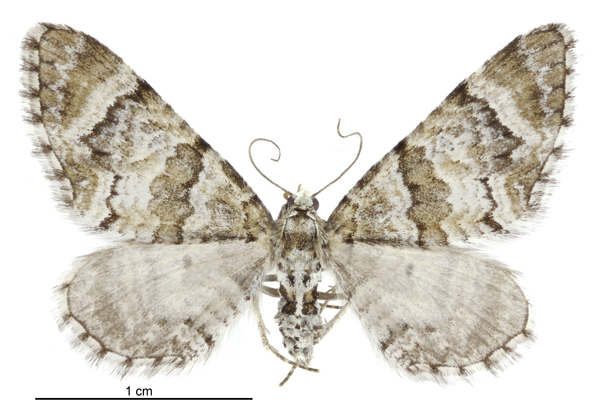
- Female
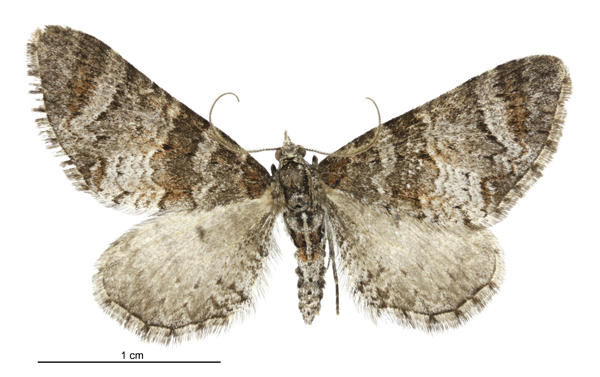
- Male

Scientific classification
- Kingdom: Animalia
- Phylum: Arthropoda
- Class: Insecta
- Order: Lepidoptera
- Family: Geometridae
- Genus: Pasiphila
- Species: P. halianthes

Binomial name
- Pasiphila halianthes (Meyrick, 1907)

Synonyms
- Chloroclystis halianthes Meyrick, 1907; Chloroclystis rufulitincta Prout, 1914

= Pasiphila halianthes =

Species of moth endemic to New Zealand

Pasiphila halianthes is a moth of the family Geometridae. It was first described by Edward Meyrick in 1907. This species is endemic to New Zealand and has been observed in both the North and South Island. It inhabits the upper edges of native forest on mountainsides. Larvae feed on the shoots and leaves of shrubs. Adults are variable in appearance but are regarded as being large in comparison to other species in this genus. They on the wing from November until April.

== Taxonomy ==
This species was first described by Edward Meyrick in 1907 using specimens collected on the mountains around the head of Lake Wakatipu at altitudes of between 3000 and 4000 ft by George Hudson. Meyrick originally named the species Chloroclystis halianthes. Hudson illustrated and discussed this species in his 1928 book The butterflies and moths of New Zealand. In 1914 Louis Beethoven Prout, thinking he was describing a new species, named this moth Chloroclystis rufulitincta. Meyrick synonymised this name in 1917. In 1971 John S. Dugdale placed this species in the genus Pasiphila. The male lectotype specimen is held at the Natural History Museum, London.

== Description ==
Meyrick described this species as follows:

♂. 26-27 mm. Head, palpi, and thorax fuscous mixed with whitish and dark fuscous, shoulders partially suffused with red; palpi 2 1/4. Antennae biciliated with long fascicles. Forewings triangular, costa posteriorly arched, termen little bowed, oblique, subsinuate above tornus; pale fuscous mixed with white and dark fuscous, sometimes partially suffused with pale red, appearing purplish-tinged; normal fasciae formed of blackish irroration; median band broad, anterior edge hardly curved, below middle sometimes largely suffused with white and partially with pale red, posterior edge running from before 3/4 of costa to tornus, very obtusely angulated below middle, followed by well-marked pale double second line; fifth and sixth fasciae little marked, below middle obsolete through contraction of area : cilia fuscous mixed with whitish, distinctly barred with dark fuscous. Hindwings with termen tolerably evenly rounded, hardly prominent on vein 3; pale-grey, towards dorsum sprinkled with black and white.

This species is likely variable in appearance and is regarded as being a relatively large species in this genus.

== Distribution ==
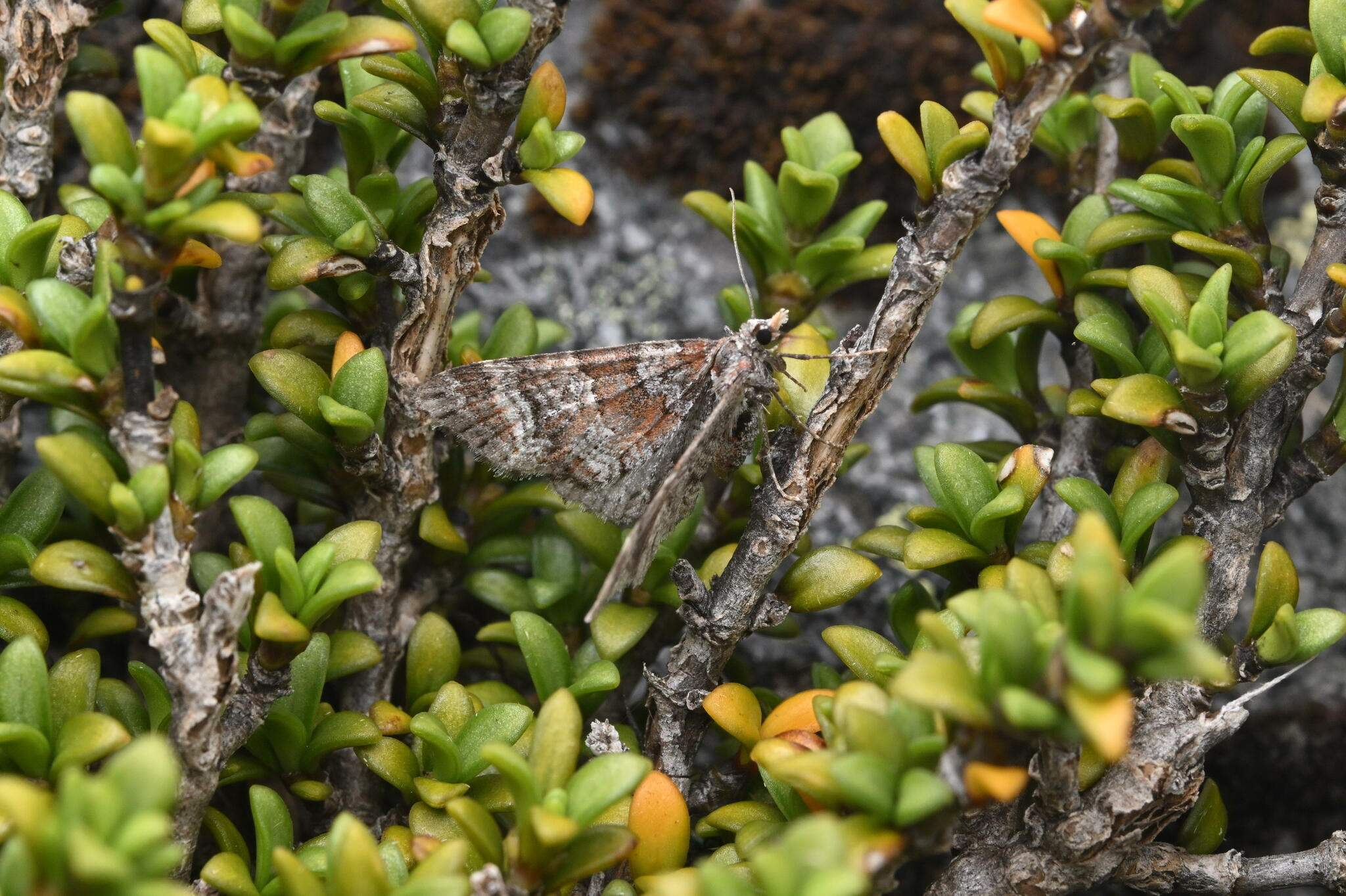
Pasiphila halianthes at Gertrude Valley.

This species is endemic to New Zealand. This species has been observed in both the North and South Islands including in the Otago and Fiordland regions.

== Habitat and hosts ==
P. halianthes inhabits the upper edges of native forest on mountainsides. The larvae of this species feed on the leaves and shoots of shrubs.

== Behaviour ==
Adults are on the wing from November until April.
