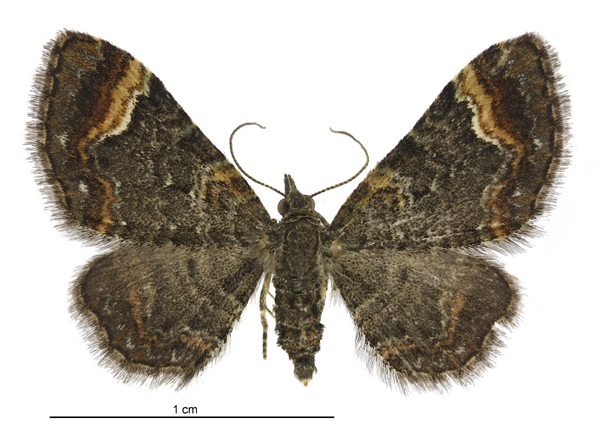
- Female
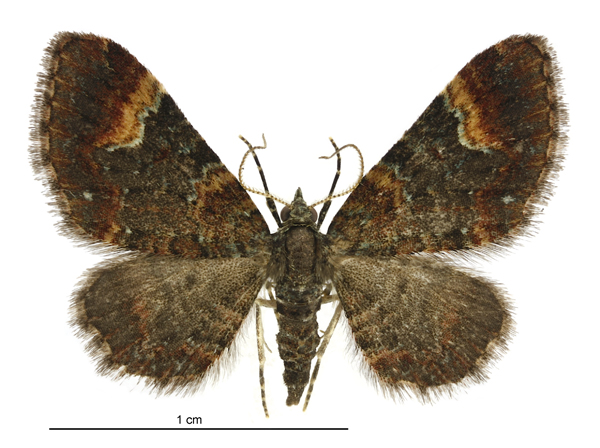
- Male

Scientific classification
- Kingdom: Animalia
- Phylum: Arthropoda
- Class: Insecta
- Order: Lepidoptera
- Family: Geometridae
- Genus: Pasiphila
- Species: P. rivalis

Binomial name
- Pasiphila rivalis (Philpott, 1916)

Synonyms
- Chloroclystis rivalis Philpott, 1916

= Pasiphila rivalis =

Species of moth endemic to New Zealand

Pasiphila rivalis is a moth of the family Geometridae. This species was first described by Alfred Philpott in 1916. It is endemic to New Zealand and is found on the North and South Islands. It inhabits native subalpine scrub. Adults of this species are commonly observed in December and January.

== Taxonomy ==
This species was first described by Alfred Philpott in 1916 and originally named Chloroclystis rivalis. In 1928 George Hudson illustrated and discussed this species under that name in his both his book The butterflies and moths of New Zealand as well as his 1939 book A supplement to the butterflies and moths of New Zealand. In 1971 John S. Dugdale placed this species in the genus Pasiphila. The male holotype, collected by Philpott at Mount Cleughearn in the Hunter Mountains, is held at the New Zealand Arthropod Collection.

== Description ==
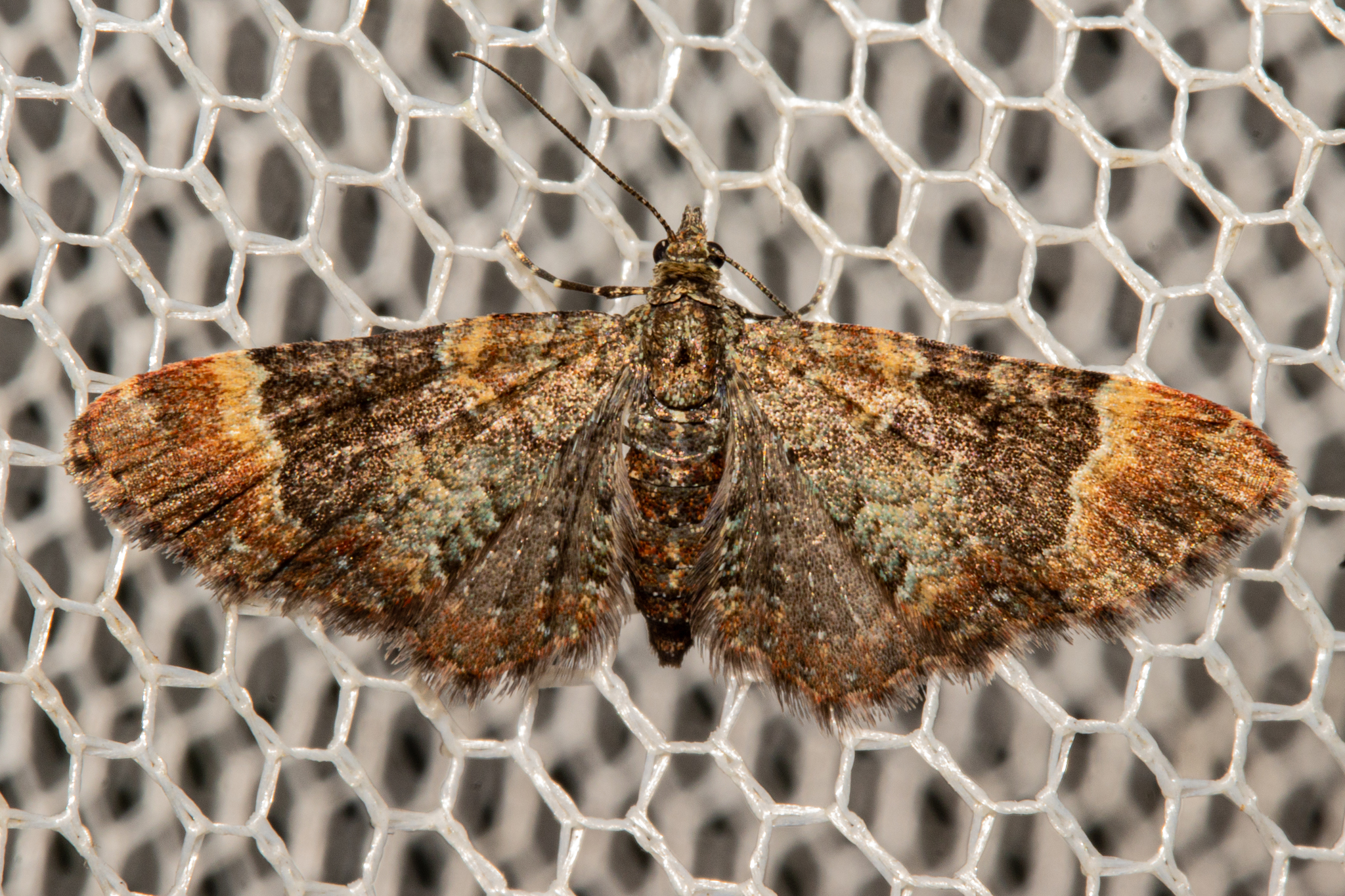
Living specimen

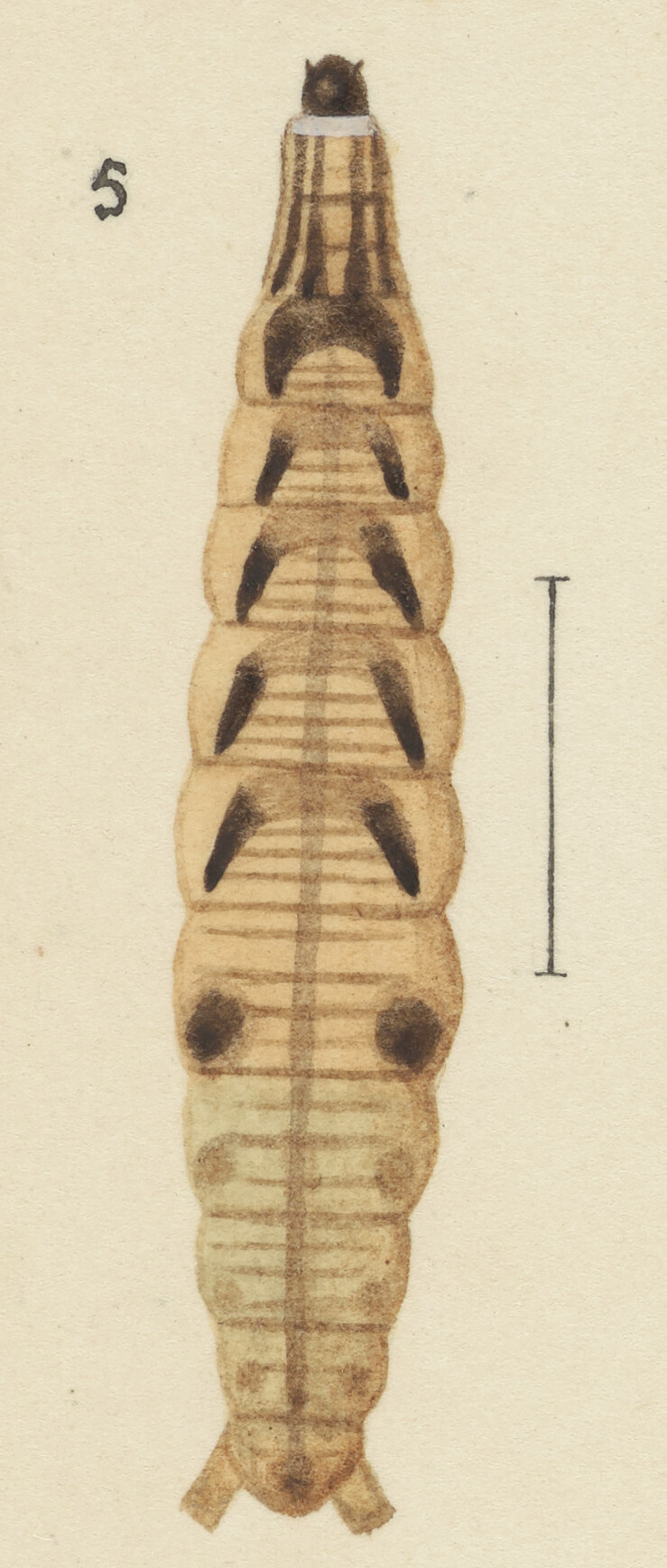
Larva illustration.

Hudson described the larva of this species as follows:

The larva which was found at Arthur's Pass, feeding on Hebe buxifolia in January, is about 1/2 inch (12 mm.) in length; cylindrical, stout, tapering anteriorly, the thoracic segments forming a snout. Head dark brown. Rest of body ochreous-fawn, paler posteriorly; markings pale chocolate-brown; a fine dorsal line; four broad, parallel, longitudinal stripes on thoracic segments; a large crescentic mark covering back of segment 5; a pair of strong diagonal marks towards sides of segments 6, 7, 8 and 9; a diffused shading on terminal segments; numerous transverse wrinkles; a diffused, dull brown, sublateral line. Underside pale dull greenish-ochreous. Legs brown; prolegs very pale ochreous-fawn.

Philpott described the adults of this species as follows:

♂♀. 17-20 mm. Head, palpi, and thorax fuscous mixed with red and white scales. Palpi 2. Antennae in ♂ fasciculate-ciliate, ciliations 3 1/2. Abdomen fuscous, densely sprinkled with reddish and grey. Forewings triangular, termen obliquely rounded ; reddish-fuscous with some slight ochreous admixture ; msdian band not clearly defined, anterior margin indicated by a pair of pale curved fasciae ; several similar fasciae within band; posterior edge of band broadly and bluntly projecting at middle, margined on upper half by a bluish-white fascia followed by a thin dark fascia, which is in turn followed by a rather broad ochreous fascia, these fasciae becoming almost obsolete on lower half ; apical area more strongly reddish ; subterminal line serrate, interrupted, .whitish or greenish ; a black terminal line : cilia fuscous, mixed with grey and obscurely barred with black on basal half. Hindwings, termen unevenly rounded ; fuscous mixed with grey and some reddish scales ; numerous alternate light and dark fasciae obscurely indicated : cilia as in forewings.

This species is easily distinguishable from similar species in its genus such as P. sandycias as it has a much darker colour to both its fore and hind wings.

== Distribution ==
This species is endemic to New Zealand. It has been observed on both the North and South Islands.

== Habitat and hosts ==
This species inhabits subalpine native scrub.

== Behaviour ==
Adults are on the wing in December and January.
