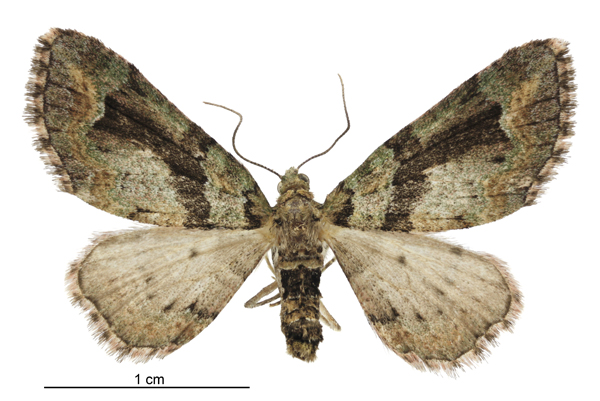
- Female

Scientific classification
- Kingdom: Animalia
- Phylum: Arthropoda
- Class: Insecta
- Order: Lepidoptera
- Family: Geometridae
- Genus: Pasiphila
- Species: P. suffusa

Binomial name
- Pasiphila suffusa (Hudson, 1928)

Synonyms
- Chloroclystis suffusa Hudson, 1928

= Pasiphila suffusa =

Species of moth

Pasiphila suffusa is a moth of the family Geometridae. This species was first described by George Hudson in 1928 using specimens collected by Morris N. Watt on Mount Taranaki and originally named Chloroclystis suffusa. It is endemic to New Zealand.

== Taxonomy ==
This species was first described by George Hudson in 1928 using specimens collected by Morris N. Watt on Mount Taranaki and originally named Chloroclystis suffusa. In 1971 John S. Dugdale placed this species in the genus Pasiphila. The male lectotype, collected by Watt at Mount Taranaki, is held at the Natural History Museum, London.

== Description ==
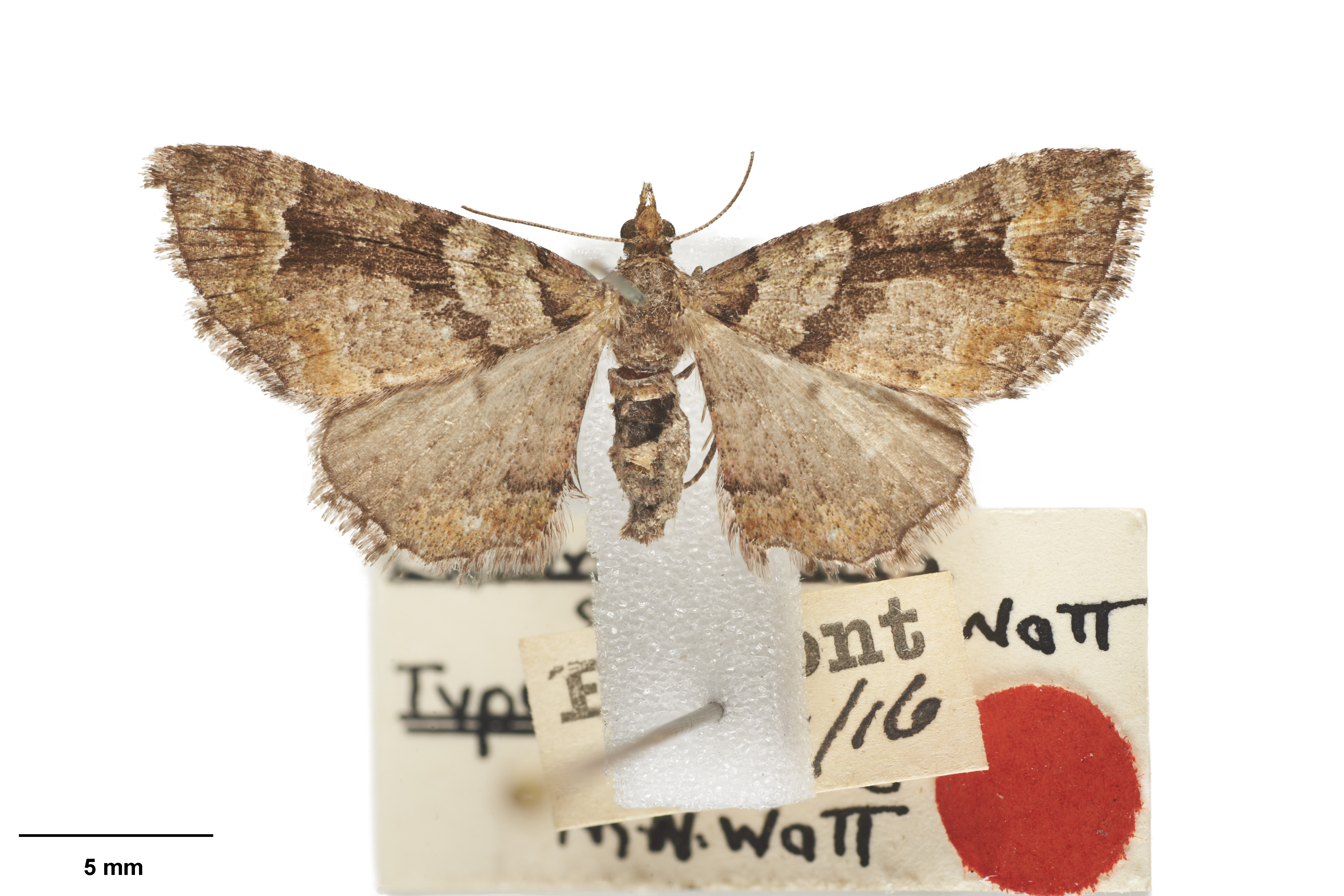
Holotype specimen of Pasiphila suffusa.

Hudson described the adults of this species as follows:

The expansion of the wings is 1 inch. The forewings are rather dark grey; there is a black-edged reddish-grey basal patch, a paler sub-basal area; the inner edge of the median ban is broadly edged with blackish-brown; there is a broad black sub-costal patch reaching from the inner to the outer edge of the median band; a warm brown subterminal band, finely edged with green towards the base and a series of blackish terminal marks. The hindwings are rather dark grey, slightly tinged with red-dish towards the dorsum where there are several blackish transverse lines. The cilia of all the wings are pinkish-grey barred with blackish.

== Distribution ==
This species is endemic to New Zealand.
