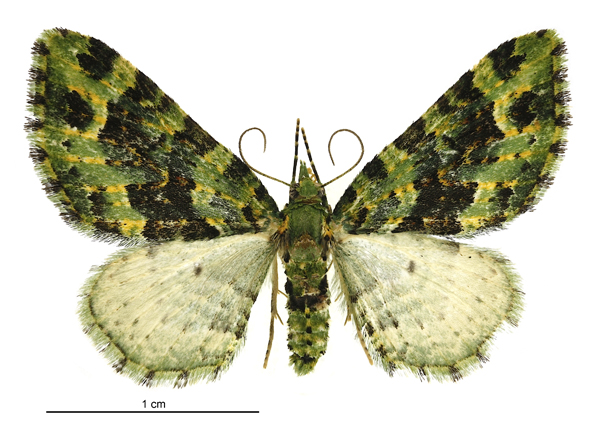
- Female
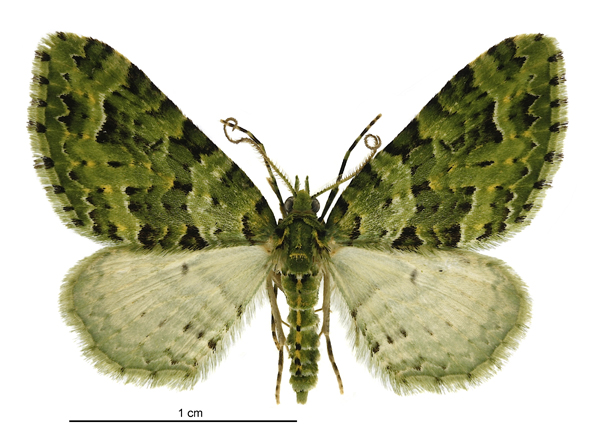
- Male

Scientific classification
- Kingdom: Animalia
- Phylum: Arthropoda
- Class: Insecta
- Order: Lepidoptera
- Family: Geometridae
- Genus: Pasiphila
- Species: P. melochlora

Binomial name
- Pasiphila melochlora (Meyrick, 1911)

Synonyms
- Chloroclystis melochlora Meyrick, 1911

= Pasiphila melochlora =

Species of moth endemic to New Zealand

Pasiphila melochlora, also known as the Green Broom Pug, is a moth of the family Geometridae. It was first described by Edward Meyrick in 1911. This species is endemic to New Zealand and has been observed in the North and South Islands. P. melochlora inhabits native forest with larvae feeding on New Zealand-native broom as well as Clianthus maximus. This species pupates in a pupa attached to an object on the surface of the ground. Adults have been observed on the wing every month of the year apart from July.

== Taxonomy ==
This species was first described by Edward Meyrick in 1911 using specimens collected by George Hudson at Ōtira River and originally named Chloroclystis melochlora. In 1928 Hudson illustrated and discussed this species under that name in his book The butterflies and moths of New Zealand. Hudson, in 1939, also discussed this species, describing and illustrating the larvae. In 1971 John S. Dugdale placed this species in the genus Pasiphila. The male lectotype specimen, collected at Ōtira River by Hudson, is held at the Natural History Museum, London.

== Description ==
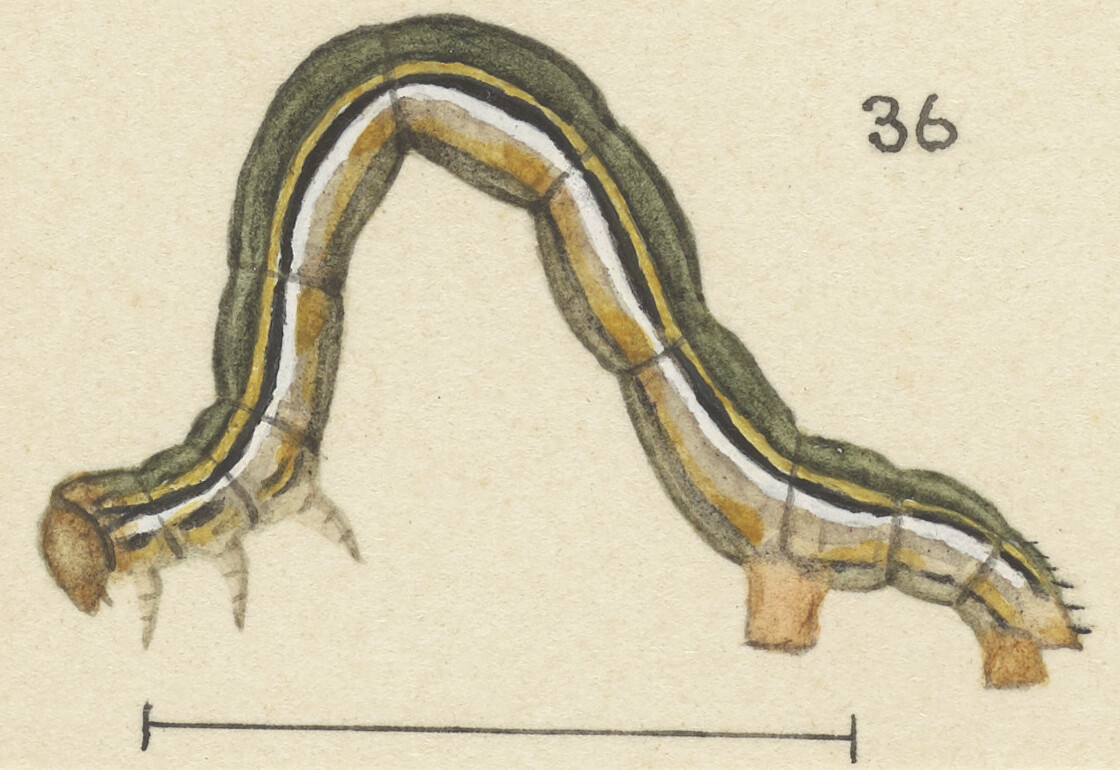
Illustration of larva.

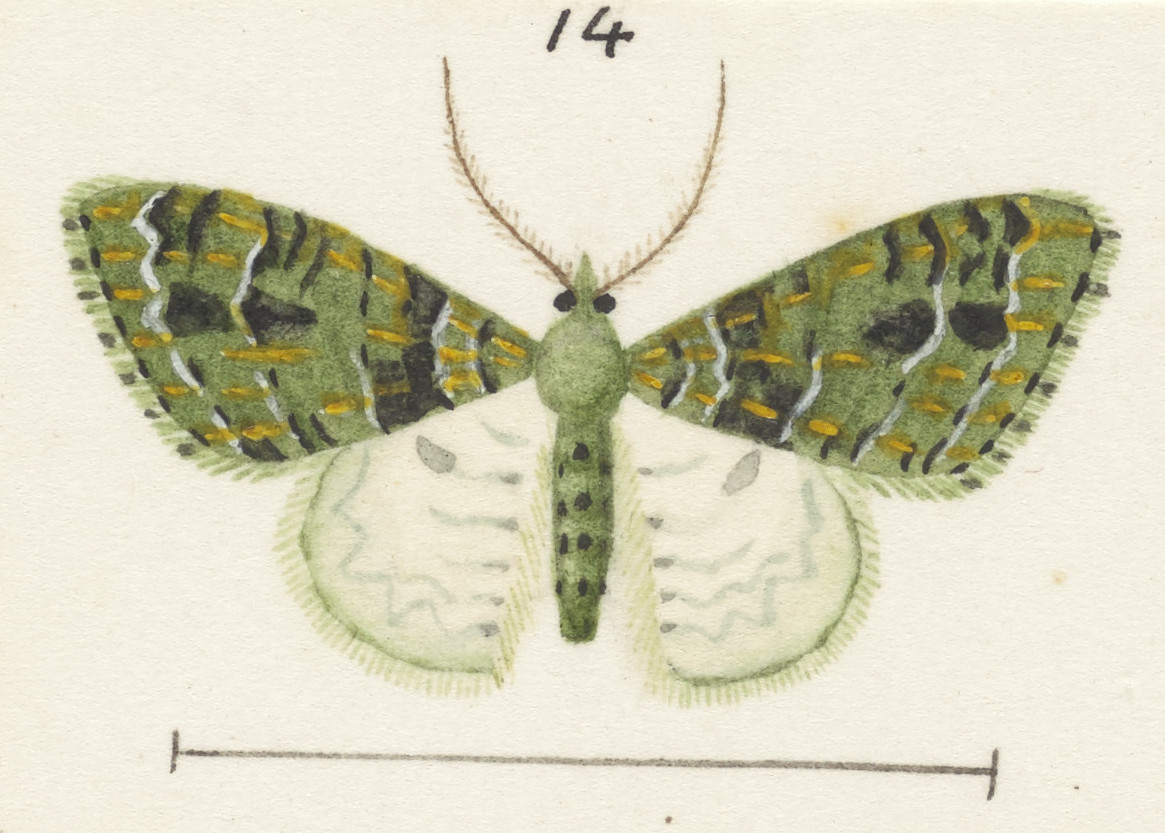
Illustration of male.

Hudson described the larva of this species as follows:

Length about 1 inch (21 mm.). Cylindrical, moderately stout, slightly stouter posteriorly and very slightly tapering towards head. Head brownish-cream-colour, dotted with blackish; legs and prolegs brownish-cream-colour; dorsal region dark greyish-green, with obscure blackish longitudinal lines and paler spots; a very broad greyish-cream coloured lateral band; a fine black subdorsal line immediately above this, more or less distinctly edged with yellow above and whitish beneath; ventral surface of larva brownish-olive-green; a few very short bristles.

Hudson explained that larvae specimens can vary considerably in depth of colouring with the lateral band being much paler in some individuals than in others.

Meyrick first described the adults of this species as follows:

♂♀. 20-27 mm. Head green. Palpi 2 2/3, green. Antennae in ♂ with two series of filaments bearing long fascicles. Thorax green, patagia spotted with black. Abdomen green, more or less dotted with black. Forewings triangular, costa somewhat sinuate in middle, apex obtuse, termen bowed, oblique ; green ; striae represented by series of irregular black marks on veins and margins, partially edged with white posteriorly, but on anterior edge of median band anteriorly ; median band broad, considerably narrowed towards dorsum, margins curved, posterior with a sinuation above middle more conspicuously marked with black and edged with white ; a transverse-linear black discal mark ; subterminal line fine, waved, white, anterior edge strongly marked with black above middle : cilia green, barred with black. Hindwings with termen rounded ; ochreous-whitish more or less tinged with greenish ; sometimes some blackish dots on veins on dorsal half ; a waved subterminal line sometimes indicated by pale-greenish anterior margin : cilia whitish-greenish.

Hudson stated that in some specimens the veins of the forewings are broadly marked in bright yellow except where they are crossed by the blackish transverse lines.

== Distribution ==
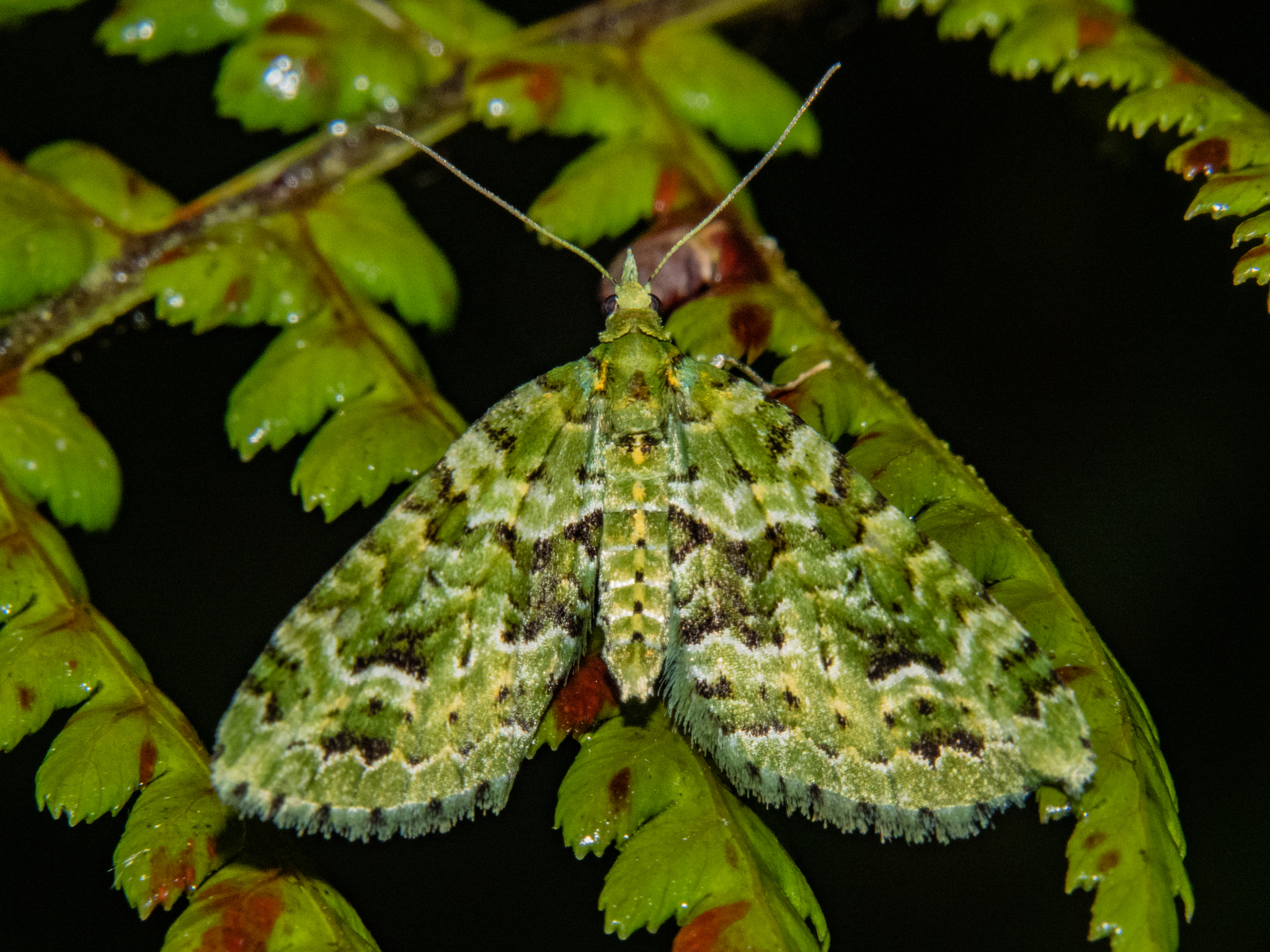
Living specimen.

This species is endemic to New Zealand and has been observed on both the North and South Islands.

== Habitat and hosts ==
P. melochlora inhabits native forest. The larvae usually feed on New Zealand-native broom species, but have also been reported feeding on the foliage of Clianthus maximus.

== Behaviour ==
This species pupates in a pupa attached to an object on the surface of the ground. The pupa is enclosed in a cocoon of silk and refuse and adult moths emerge in late February. Hudson hypothesised that there are probably two broods in the season. Adults have been observed on the wing every month of the year apart from July.
