= Pasiphila coelica =

Scientific classification
- Kingdom: Animalia
- Phylum: Arthropoda
- Clade: Pancrustacea
- Class: Insecta
- Order: Lepidoptera
- Family: Geometridae
- Genus: Pasiphila
- Species: P. coelica

Binomial name
- Pasiphila coelica (Prout, 1932)

Synonyms
- Chloroclystis coelica Prout, 1932

Species of moth

Pasiphila coelica is a moth in the family Geometridae. It is endemic to Borneo.

The length of the forewings is 10–12 millimetres (0.39–0.47 in). The forewings are variegated with dark brown, green to almost whitish.
