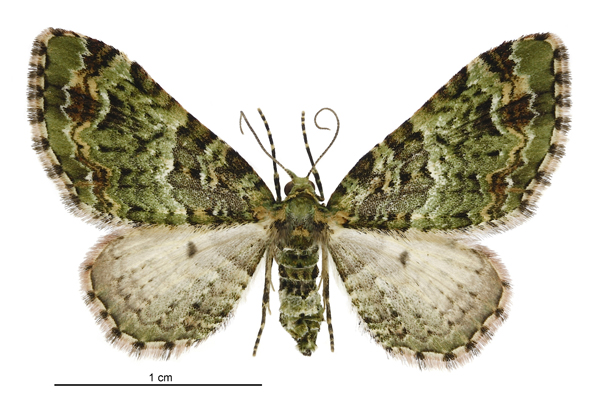
- Female specimen
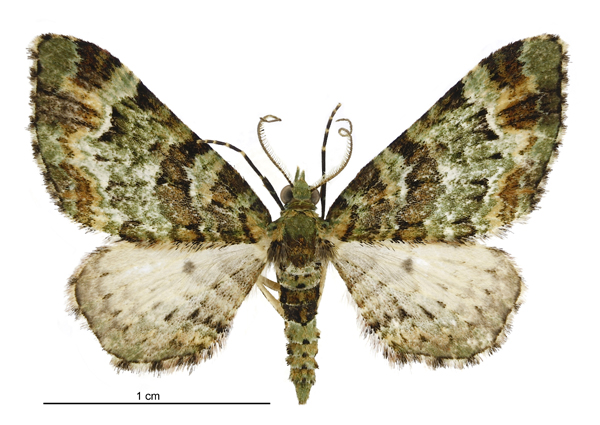
- Male specimen

Scientific classification
- Kingdom: Animalia
- Phylum: Arthropoda
- Class: Insecta
- Order: Lepidoptera
- Family: Geometridae
- Genus: Pasiphila
- Species: P. bilineolata

Binomial name
- Pasiphila bilineolata (Walker, 1862)

Synonyms
- Eupithecia bilineolata Walker, 1862; Chloroclystis lacustris Meyrick, 1913; Chloroclystis paralodes Meyrick, 1913; Chloroclystis zatricha Meyrick, 1913; Chloroclystis bilineolata (Walker, 1862)

= Pasiphila bilineolata =

Species of moth

Pasiphila bilineolata is a moth in the family Geometridae. It is endemic to New Zealand and can be found in the North and South Islands. The species inhabits native forest and shrubland and the larvae feed on Hebe species. Adults are on the wing commonly from August to January but have been observed most months of the year and are attracted to light.

== Taxonomy ==
This species was first described by Francis Walker in 1862 and named Eupithecia bilineolata. Walker used a specimen collected by T. R. Oxley in Nelson. In 1888 Edward Meyrick placed this species in the genus Pasiphila. In 1898 and again in 1928 George Hudson discussed and illustrated this species under the name Chloroclystis bilineolata. In 1971 John S. Dugdale placed this species back in the genus Pasiphila. In 1988 Dugdale confirmed this placement and also synonymised Chloroclystis lacustris, Chloroclystis paralodes and Chloroclystis zatricha with this species. Robert Hoare, in the New Zealand Inventory of Biodiversity, followed this placement. The female holotype specimen is held at the Natural History Museum, London.

== Description ==
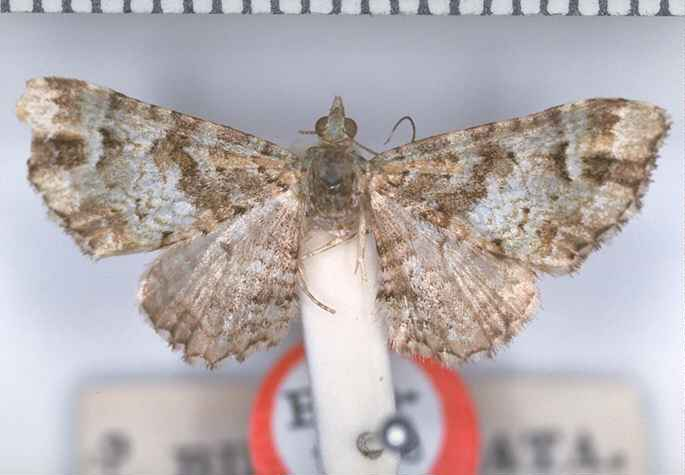
Holotype of Pasiphila bilineolata.

Walker described the species as follows:

Female. Greenish cinereous. Palpi obliquely ascending, as long as the breadth of the head. Thorax with two black points on each side. Abdomen slightly crested, with a broad blackish band near the base. Wings rather broad, with several brown denticulated lives, some of which, and especially in the fore wings, are clouded or pointed with black; submarginal line whitish, zigzag; marginal points black, elongated. Fore wings slightly acute, with a fawn coloured tinge at the base, and with a black discal point. Hind wings reddish cinereous. Length of the body 4 lines; of the wings 12 lines.

The forewings are bright green with numerous wavy darker lines. The hindwings are grey, slightly tinged with reddish. Adults are on wing from September to May.

== Distribution ==
This species is endemic to New Zealand. This species has been observed in the North and South Islands.

== Behaviour ==
This species is on the wing mainly from August to January but observations have also been recorded in February, April, May and June. This species is attracted to light.

== Habitat and hosts ==
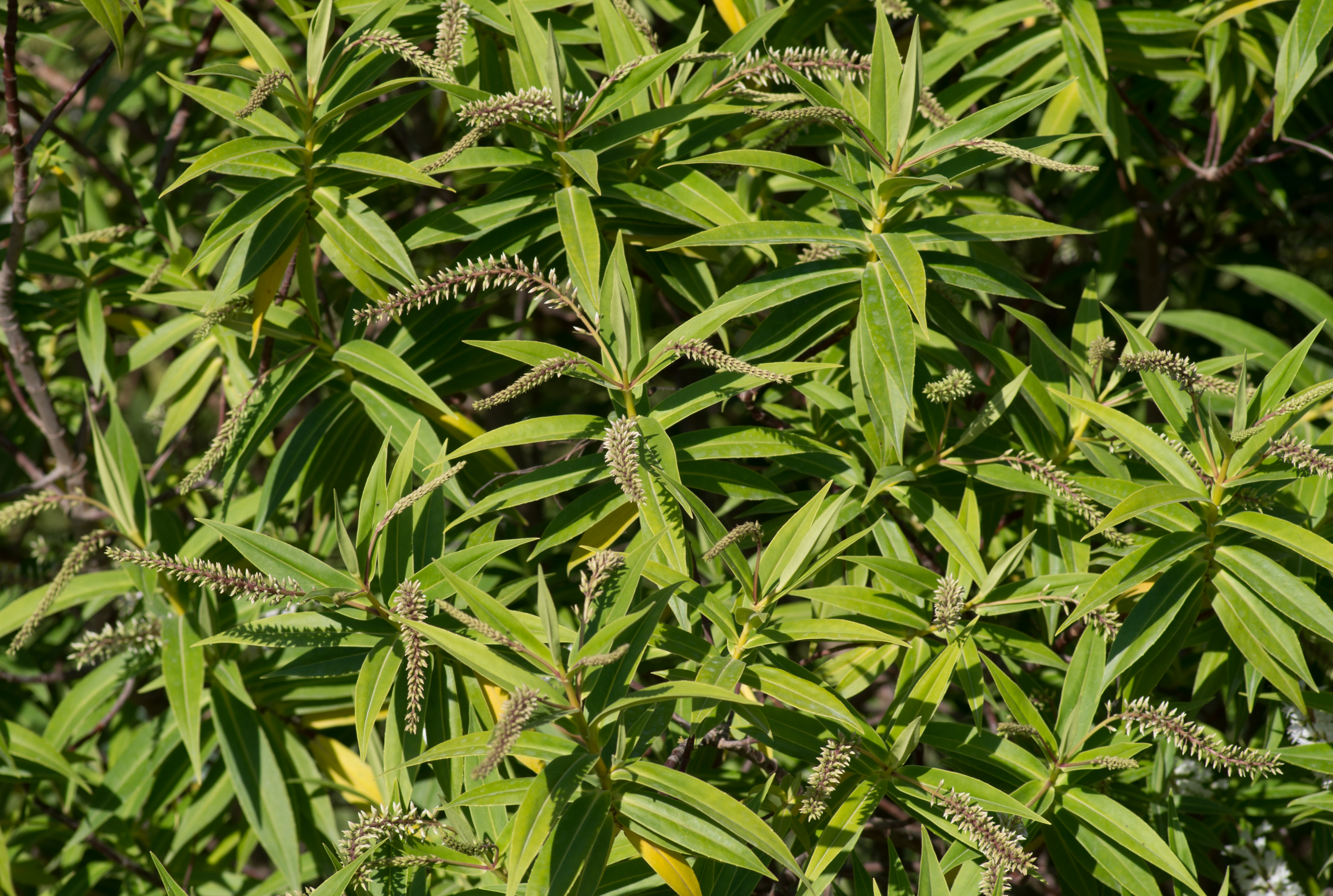
Larval host Veronica salicifolia.

The larvae feed on the flowers and foliage of Hebe species. Adults of this species inhabit native forest and shrublands. Adult moths have been observed feeding on the flowers of Dracophyllum acerosum, Dracophyllum uniflorum and Veronica salicifolia.
