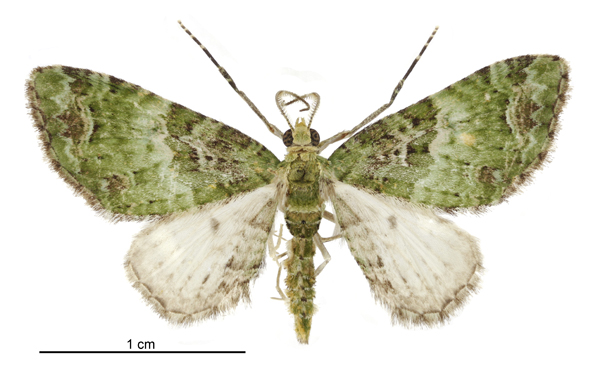
- Male
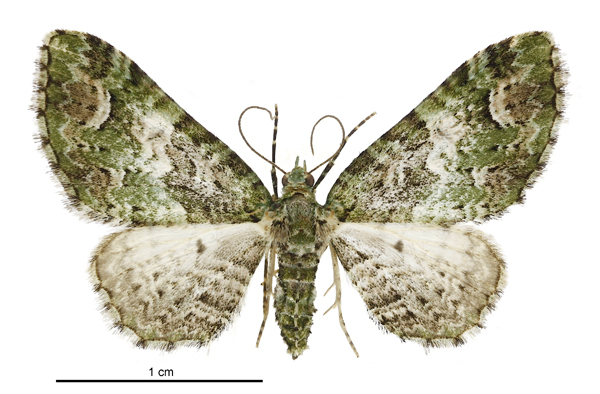
- Female

Scientific classification
- Kingdom: Animalia
- Phylum: Arthropoda
- Clade: Pancrustacea
- Class: Insecta
- Order: Lepidoptera
- Family: Geometridae
- Genus: Pasiphila
- Species: P. semochlora

Binomial name
- Pasiphila semochlora (Meyrick, 1919)

Synonyms
- Chloroclystis semochlora Meyrick, 1919

= Pasiphila semochlora =

Species of moth

Pasiphila semochlora is a moth of the family Geometridae. This species was first described by Edward Meyrick in 1919. It is endemic to New Zealand and is found in the subalpine zone of Mount Taranaki.

== Taxonomy ==
This species was first described by Edward Meyrick in 1919 and originally named Chloroclystis semochlora. In 1928 George Hudson illustrated and discussed this species under that name in his book The butterflies and moths of New Zealand. In 1971 John S. Dugdale placed this species in the genus Pasiphila. The male lectotype, collected by Hudson at Mount Taranaki, is held at the Natural History Museum, London.

== Description ==
Meyrick described the adults of the species as follows:

♂♀. 26-28 mm. Head, thorax, and abdomen green, patagia tipped with grey hairs beyond a black bar. Palpi 2, green, tip whitish. Antennal ciliations fasciculated (3 1/2). Forewings broad-triangular, termen hardly waved, rounded, rather oblique; green; basal, second, and third fasciae deeper olive-green, especially third, somewhat curved, waved, slightly marked with black on edges, third preceded and followed by slight whitish suffusion in disc; fourth fascia composed of three waved slightly curved somewhat darker lines, edged posteriorly above middle by a curved black line edged with white posteriorly and followed by a roundish grey spot becoming whitish anteriorly; fifth fascia indicated by small black marks between this spot and costa, elsewhere by faint traces of whitish lines and some black marks on veins; subterminal line pale bluish-green, waved-dentate; a fine black interrupted terminal line : cilia pale-greyish, towards base triangularly barred with darker grey. Hindwings with termen rather unevenly rounded; grey-whitish, on dorsal half with more or less marked grey waved transverse lines, two of these towards tornus suffusedly blackish on dorsal area; a grey terminal fascia enclosing a waved-dentate whitish line; lower half of termen sometimes suffused with light green; a fine interrupted blackish terminal line : cilia pale grey, with indications of darker bars.

== Distribution ==
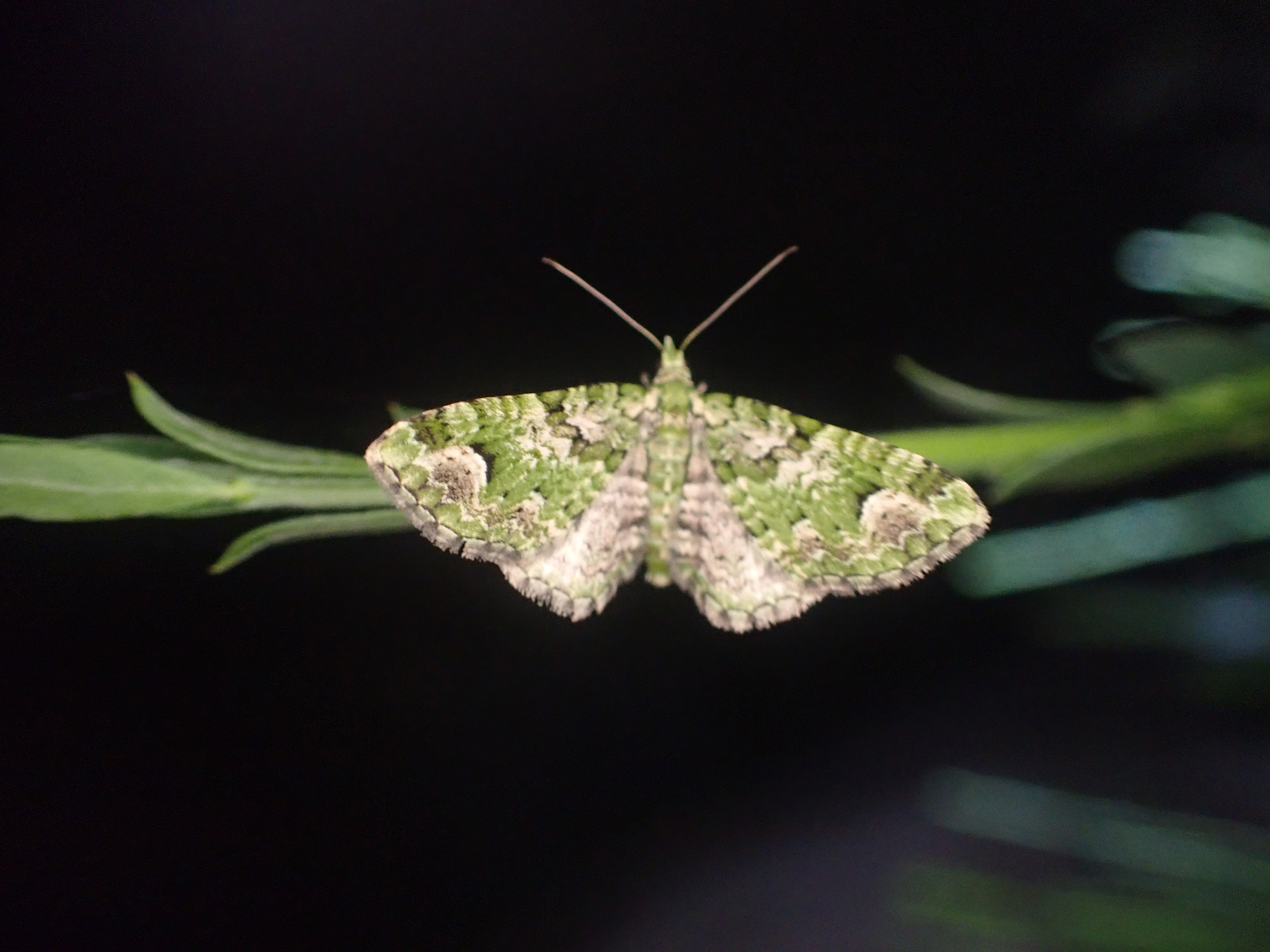
Living specimen.

This species is endemic to New Zealand. It has only been found in the subalpine zone of Mount Taranaki.

== Behaviour ==
The adults of this species is on the wing in February.
