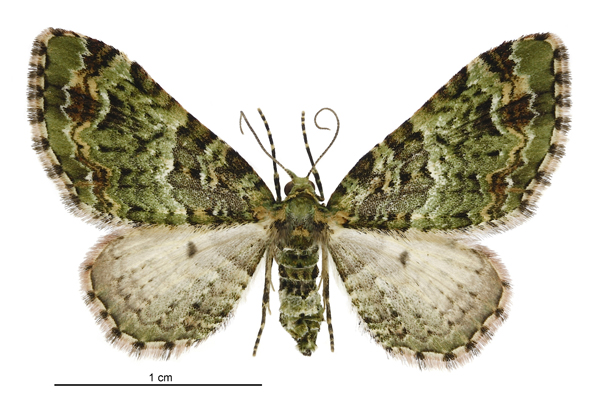
- Pasiphila bilineolata

Scientific classification
- Kingdom: Animalia
- Phylum: Arthropoda
- Class: Insecta
- Order: Lepidoptera
- Family: Geometridae
- Tribe: Eupitheciini
- Genus: Pasiphila; Meyrick, 1883

Type species
- Pasiphila bilineolata

Synonyms
- Calliclystis Dietze, 1910; Cithecia Staudinger, 1897; Helastiodes Warren, 1895; Gymnodisca Warren, 1895

= Pasiphila =

Genus of moths

Pasiphila is a genus of moths in the family Geometridae. It was described by Edward Meyrick in 1883. Meyrick gave a more detailed description of this genus in 1884. As of 2005 about 36 species were known, and of these, some 27 are native to New Zealand.

== Species ==
- Pasiphila acompsa
- Pasiphila aristias
- Pasiphila bilineolata
- Pasiphila charybdis
- Pasiphila chloerata - sloe pug
- Pasiphila coelica
- Pasiphila cotinaea
- Pasiphila debiliata
- Pasiphila derasata
- Pasiphila dryas
- Pasiphila erratica
- Pasiphila excisa
- Pasiphila fumipalpata
- Pasiphila furva
- Pasiphila halianthes
- Pasiphila heighwayi
- Pasiphila humilis
- Pasiphila hyrcanica
- Pasiphila kumakurai
- Pasiphila lita
- Pasiphila lunata
- Pasiphila magnimaculata
- Pasiphila malachita
- Pasiphila melochlora
- Pasiphila muscosata
- Pasiphila nebulosa
- Pasiphila obscura
- Pasiphila plinthina
- Pasiphila punicea
- Pasiphila rectangulata - green pug
- Pasiphila rivalis
- Pasiphila rubella
- Pasiphila sandycias
- Pasiphila semochlora
- Pasiphila socotrensis
- Pasiphila subcinctata
- Pasiphila suffusa
- Pasiphila urticae
- Pasiphila vieta

== Taxonomy ==
Pasiphila was formerly treated as a synonym of Chloroclystis, as was Gymnodisca, which is now mostly treated as a subgenus of Pasiphila. Rhinoprora is sometimes treated as a synonym of subgenus Gymnodisca.

Furthermore, a number of species which were included in Pasiphila are now mostly placed in Pasiphilodes.
