= Pasiphila subcinctata =

Scientific classification
- Kingdom: Animalia
- Phylum: Arthropoda
- Clade: Pancrustacea
- Class: Insecta
- Order: Lepidoptera
- Family: Geometridae
- Genus: Pasiphila
- Species: P. subcinctata

Binomial name
- Pasiphila subcinctata (Prout, 1915)

Synonyms
- Chloroclystis subcinctata Prout, 1915

Species of moth

Pasiphila subcinctata is a moth in the family Geometridae. It is found in the Russian Far East (Amur, Primorye, Sakhalin), Korea and Japan.
