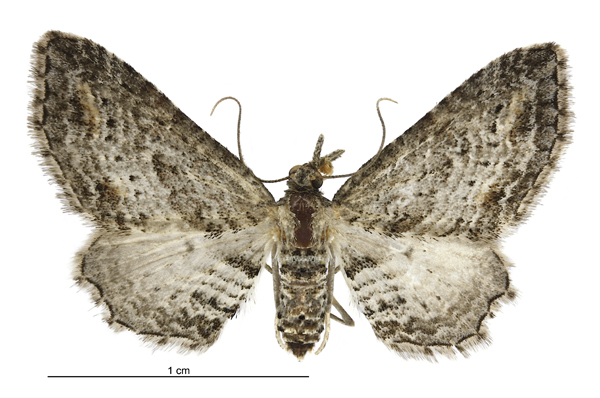
- Female
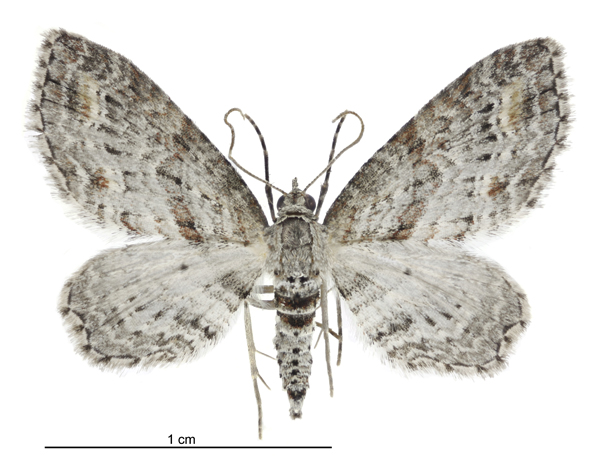
- Male

Scientific classification
- Kingdom: Animalia
- Phylum: Arthropoda
- Class: Insecta
- Order: Lepidoptera
- Family: Geometridae
- Genus: Pasiphila
- Species: P. humilis

Binomial name
- Pasiphila humilis (Philpott, 1917)

Synonyms
- Chloroclystis humilis Philpott, 1917; Chloroclystis melanocentra Meyrick, 1934; Pasiphila melanocentra (Meyrick, 1934)

= Pasiphila humilis =

Species of moth

Pasiphila humilis is a moth of the family Geometridae. This species was first described by Alfred Philpott in 1917. It is endemic to New Zealand and is most commonly observed in the South Island. The larvae feed on the flowers of species in the genus Dracophyllum. Adults are on the wing regularly from October until January.

== Taxonomy ==
This species was first described by Alfred Philpott in 1917 using specimens collected by Merlin Owen Pasco in Queenstown. In 1928 George Hudson illustrated and discussed this species under that name in his book The butterflies and moths of New Zealand. In 1934 Edward Meyrick, thinking he was describing a new species, named this moth Chloroclystis melanocentra. In 1971 John S. Dugdale placed this species in the genus Pasiphila. In 1988 Dugdale synonymised Pasiphila melaocentra with P. humilis. The male holotype, collected by Pasco and held in his collection at the Southland Museum, has been lost. The female allotype, designated by Philpott, is held at the New Zealand Arthropod Collection.

== Description ==
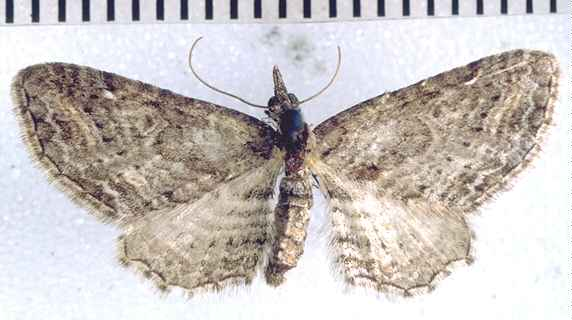
Allotype female of Pasiphila humilis

Philpott described the adults of this species as follows:

♂♀. 22-25 mm. Head, palpi, thorax, and abdomen grey sprinkled with black. Palpi in ♀ 3 1/2, in ♂ slightly less. Antennae in ♂ evenly ciliated, 3/4. Forewings rather narrow, costa hardly arched, termen bowed, strongly oblique; fuscous-grey, irrorated with black, sometimes with faint pink suffusion; numerous waved white lines, more prominent on apical half of wing; margin of the slightly darker basal portion of wing sharply and triangularly indented opposite discal spot; a black line along termen : cilia whitish-grey with fuscous median line. Hindwings, termen unevenly rounded, in ♂ deeply sinuate above middle; greyish-white with numerous incomplete waved bluish lines : cilia grey, obscurely barred with fuscous.

== Distribution ==
This species is endemic to New Zealand. This species is most frequently observed in the South Island.

== Habitat and hosts ==
The larvae feed on the flowers of Dracophyllum species.

== Behaviour ==
The adults of this species have been observed as being commonly on the wing from October to January.
