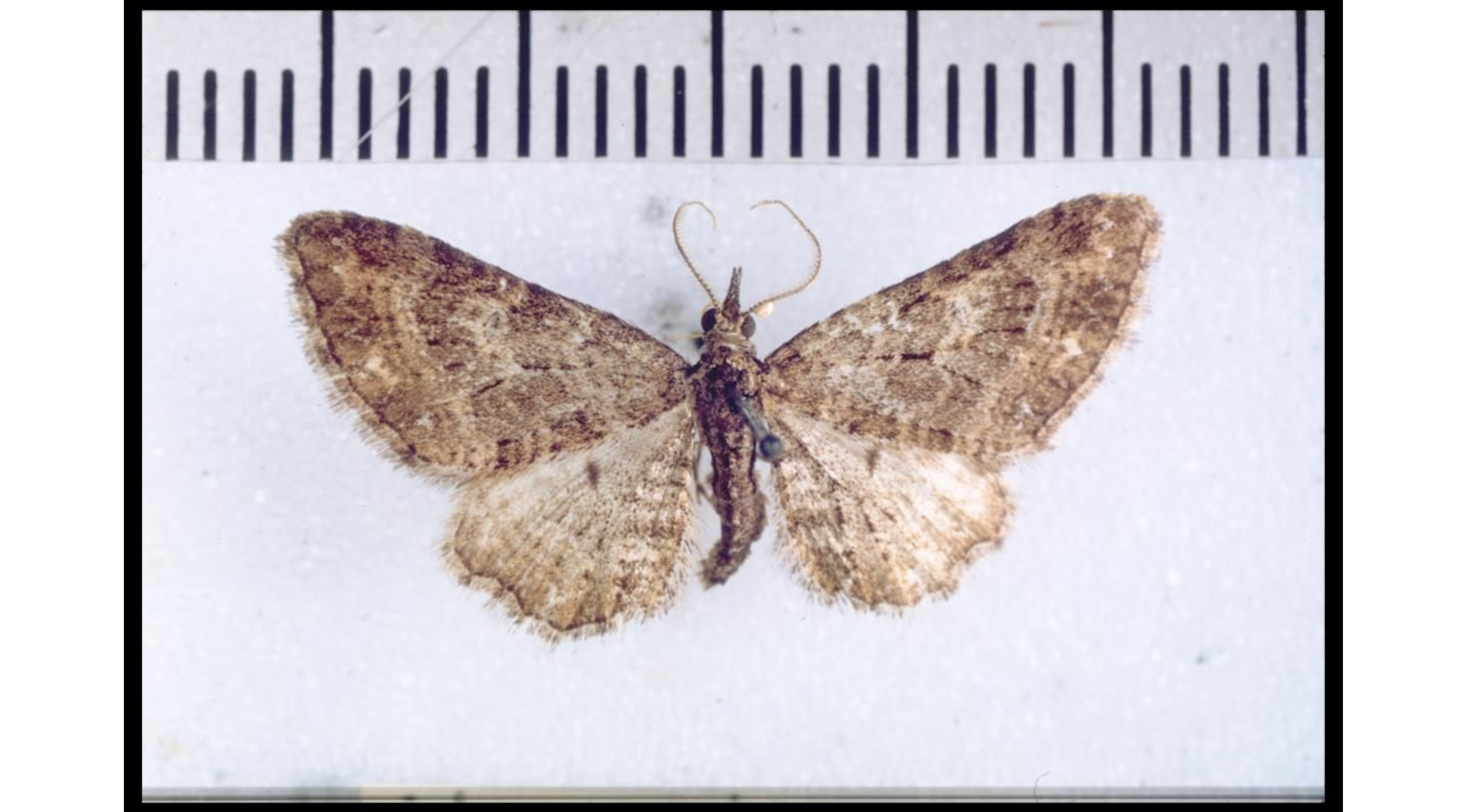
- Holotype specimen

Conservation status
- Data Deficit (NZ TCS)

Scientific classification
- Kingdom: Animalia
- Phylum: Arthropoda
- Clade: Pancrustacea
- Class: Insecta
- Order: Lepidoptera
- Family: Geometridae
- Genus: Pasiphila
- Species: P. heighwayi

Binomial name
- Pasiphila heighwayi (Philpott, 1927)

Synonyms
- Chloroclystis heighwayi Philpott, 1927

= Pasiphila heighwayi =

Species of moth

Pasiphila heighwayi is a moth in the family Geometridae. It was first described by Alfred Philpott in 1927. This species is endemic to New Zealand and has been observed on the Banks Peninsular and in North Canterbury. Larvae feed on the flowers of Veronica traversii. In 2025 this species was classified as "data deficient" under the New Zealand Threat Classification System.

== Taxonomy ==
This species was first described by Alfred Philpott in 1927 using specimens collected at Pukeatua Bush on Banks Peninsula in Canterbury by William Heighway and Stewart Lindsay in the last week of September. In 1928 George Hudson discussed this species under that name in his book The butterflies and moths of New Zealand. In 1971 John S. Dugdale placed this species in the genus Pasiphila. The male holotype is held at the New Zealand Arthropod Collection.

== Description ==
Philpott described the adult male of this species as follows:

♂. 23–24 mm. Head, thorax and abdomen greyish-pink mixed with fuscous and black. Palpi 2, fuscous-grey with some white scales above. Antennae fasciculate-ciliate, greyish-pink annulated with fuscous basally, ciliations 3½. Legs ochreous-grey, densely irrorated with fuscous, tarsi annulated with ochreous-grey. Forewings triangular, costa slightly arched basally, subsinuate at middle, apex round-pointed, termen slightly bowed; pinkish-grey densely irrorated with fuscous; veins blackish; a series of very obscure darker irregular transverse lines, here and there margined with whitish, more pronounced at 1/4, before 1/2, and 2/3; an indistinct serrate subterminal line, interrupted above dorsum; a black line round termen: fringes pinkish-grey with median white line and indications of dark bars. Hindwings, termen moderate, sinuate below apex and above tornus leaving a broad blunt median projection; colour as in forewings but markings still more obscure; a dark discal dot: fringes as in forewings.

== Distribution ==
This species is endemic to New Zealand and has been observed on the Banks Peninsular as well as in the Waitohi River shrublands in North Canterbury. This species is regarded as being rare.

== Habitat and hosts ==
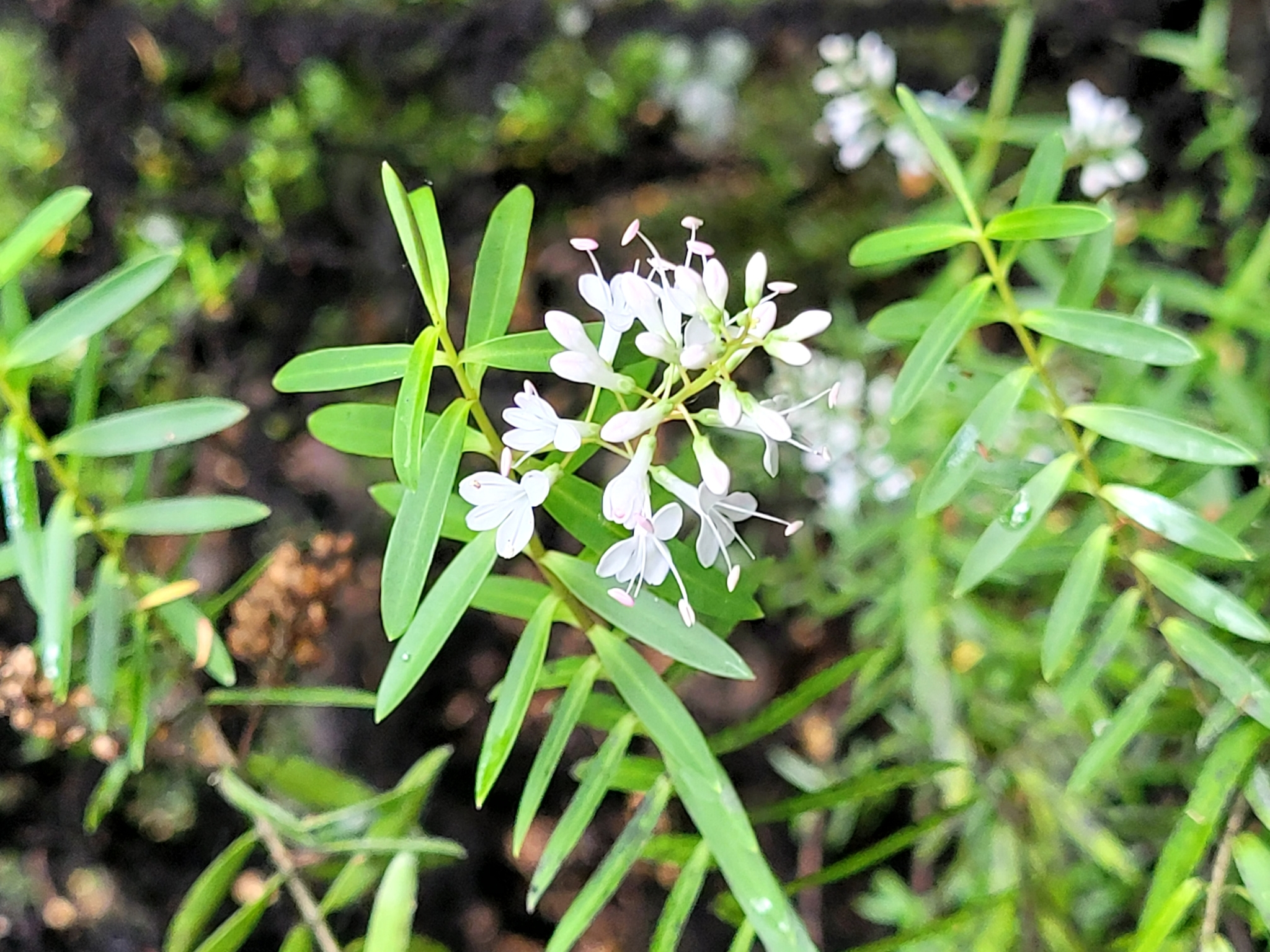
Larval host Veronica traversii.

The larvae feed on the flowers of Veronica traversii.

== Conservation status ==
In 2025 this species was classified by the New Zealand Department of Conservation as "data deficient" under the New Zealand Threat Classification System as a result of the difficulty in identifying the species.
