= Pasiphila kumakurai =

Scientific classification
- Kingdom: Animalia
- Phylum: Arthropoda
- Class: Insecta
- Order: Lepidoptera
- Family: Geometridae
- Genus: Pasiphila
- Species: P. kumakurai

Binomial name
- Pasiphila kumakurai (Inoue, 1958)

Synonyms
- Chloroclystis kumakurai Inoue, 1958

Species of moth

Pasiphila kumakurai is a moth in the family Geometridae. This species was first validly described by Hiroshi Inoue in 1958 and named Chloroclystis kumakurai. It is found in Japan.
