= Pasiphila obscura =

Scientific classification
- Domain: Eukaryota
- Kingdom: Animalia
- Phylum: Arthropoda
- Class: Insecta
- Order: Lepidoptera
- Family: Geometridae
- Genus: Pasiphila
- Species: P. obscura

Binomial name
- Pasiphila obscura (West, 1929)

Synonyms
- Chloroclystis obscura West, 1929

Species of moth

Pasiphila obscura is a moth in the family Geometridae. It is found in Japan and Russia.

The wingspan is 17–19 millimetres (0.67–0.75 in).
