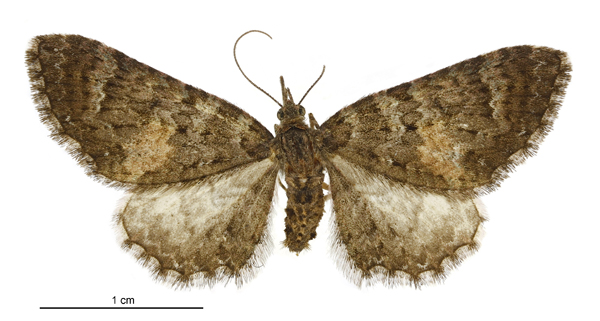
- Female
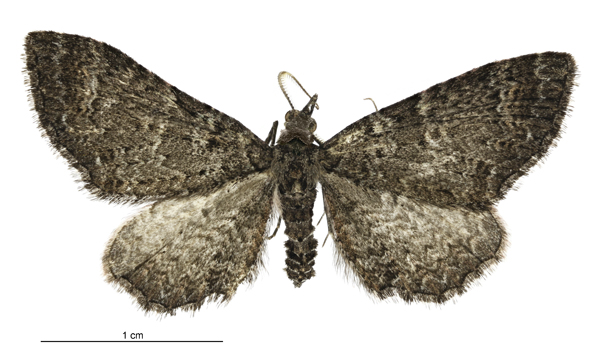
- Male

Scientific classification
- Kingdom: Animalia
- Phylum: Arthropoda
- Class: Insecta
- Order: Lepidoptera
- Family: Geometridae
- Genus: Pasiphila
- Species: P. rubella

Binomial name
- Pasiphila rubella (Philpott, 1915)

Synonyms
- Chloroclystis rubella Philpott, 1915

= Pasiphila rubella =

Species of moth endemic to New Zealand

Pasiphila rubella is a moth of the family Geometridae. This species was first described by Alfred Philpott in 1915. It is endemic to New Zealand and has been observed in the South Island. P. rubella inhabit the upper edges of native forest at elevations of up to 4000 ft. Adults are commonly on the wing in December and January and have an affinity for Veronica odora. They are attracted to light. Larvae feed on the flowers of Veronica species.

== Taxonomy ==
This species was first described by Alfred Philpott in 1915 using specimens collected by Stewart Lindsay and Walter Oliver at Bold Peak in the Humboldt Range in December as well as specimens collected by Merlin Owen Pasco at Ben Lomond. Philpott originally named the species Chlorolystis rubella. In 1928 George Hudson illustrated and discussed this species under that name in his book The butterflies and moths of New Zealand. In 1971 John S. Dugdale placed this species in the genus Pasiphila. The male holotype, collected by Charles C. Fenwick at Bold Peak in Otago, is held at Te Papa.

== Description ==
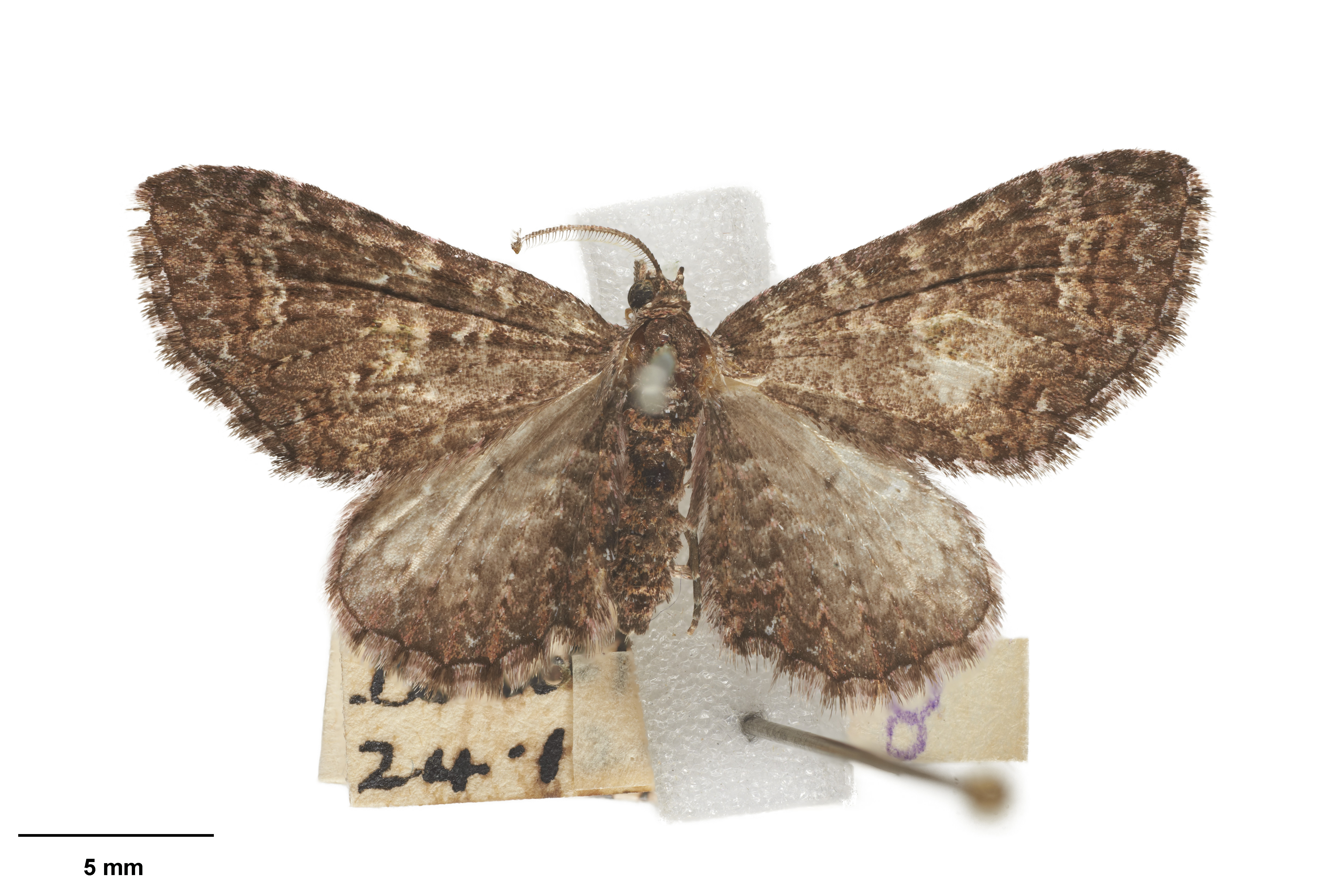
Holotype specimen of Pasiphila rubella.

Philpott described the adults of this species as follows:

♂♀. 28-29 mm. Head, palpi, thorax, and abdomen dark greenish- fuscous with some admixture of greyisb-pink and white scales. Palpi 2. Antennae in ♂ ciliate-fasciculate, ciliations 4. Forewings triangular, broad, costa in ♂ rather strongly arched on apical fourth, termen obliquely bowed ; dark greenish-fuscous mixed with black and tinted, especially round tornus, with pink ; veins interruptedly marked with black ; lines very obscure : a double, outwardly somewhat dentate, line at 1/4 ; a hardly traceable similar basal line ; median band moderate, inward margin curved, subdentate ; outer margin irregular, followed by 4 or 5 alternate lighter and darker lines, most distinct on costal half ; subterminal line bluish-green, serrate : cilia, basal half and suffused bars fuscous-greenish, apical half grey, flushed with pink. Hindwings, termen rounded ; fuscous grey, darker and flushed with pink towards dorsum and termen ; numerous obscure lighter and darker waved lines : cilia as in forewings.

== Distribution ==
This species is endemic to New Zealand. This species has been observed in the South Island.

== Habitat and hosts ==
P. rubella inhabit the upper edges of native forest at elevations of up to 4000 ft. The larvae feed on the flowers of Veronica species.

== Behaviour ==
Adults of this species are commonly on the wing in December and January and have an affinity for Veronica odora. They are attracted to light.
