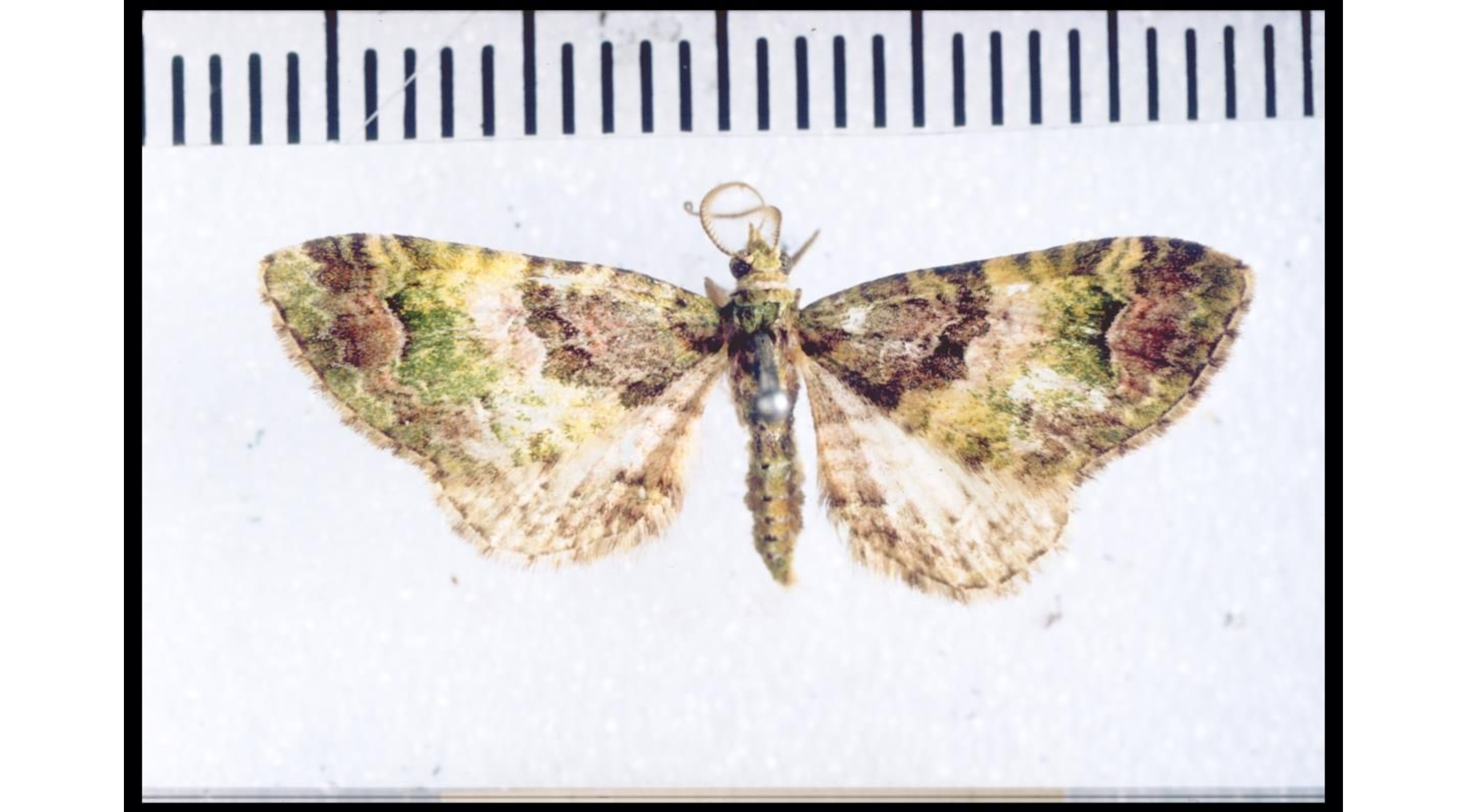
- Holotype specimen

Scientific classification
- Kingdom: Animalia
- Phylum: Arthropoda
- Class: Insecta
- Order: Lepidoptera
- Family: Geometridae
- Genus: Pasiphila
- Species: P. punicea

Binomial name
- Pasiphila punicea (Philpott, 1923)

Synonyms
- Chloroclystis punicea Philpott, 1923

= Pasiphila punicea =

Species of moth

Pasiphila punicea is a moth of the family Geometridae. This species was first described by Alfred Philpott in 1923. It is endemic to New Zealand and has been observed in the North and South Islands. The species inhabits native forest and scrub and has an affinity for Veronica species.

== Taxonomy ==
This species for first described in 1923 by Alfred Philpott and originally named Chloroclystis punicea. In 1928 George Hudson illustrated and discussed this species under that name in his book The butterflies and moths of New Zealand. In 1971 John S. Dugdale placed this species in the genus Pasiphila. The male holotype, collected by Philpott at Rowallan in Fiordland, is held at the New Zealand Arthropod Collection.

== Description ==
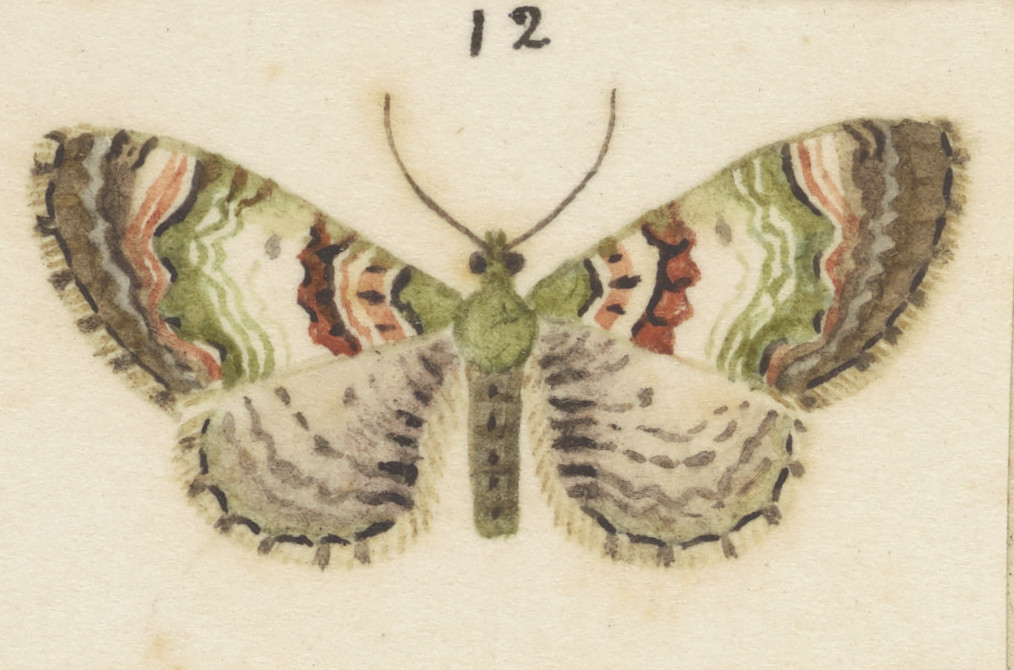
Illustration of female.

Philpott described the male of this species as follows:

♂. 25mm. Head green mixed with yellow. Palpiochreous. Antennae shaft ochreous, annulated with brown, ciliations 4. Thorax green, densely mixed with ochreous and golden scales. Abdomen green, much mix with blackish on basal segments and with ochreous on apical ones ; anal tuft whitish ; a black spot on five or six median segments. Legs whitish-ochreous, anterior tarsi annulated with dark fuscous. Forewings, costa almost straight, apex abtuse, termen evenly rounded, bright green irrorated with fuscous and sprinkled with yellow ; an indistinct curved waved lines preceding first and the whole area flushed with pink ; median band traversed by several indistinct irregular thin fuscous lines ; posterior edge of median band twice incurved оп upper half, thence irregularly incurved to dorsum, broadly margined with a pink area posteriorly which is traversed by several indistinct fuscous lines following the contour of the band; a serrated clear green subterminal line; termen marked with an almost continuous blackish line: cilia greyish-green barred with black. Hindwings white, tinged with pink round termen and dorsum; numerous irregular fuscous transverse lines, those on the basal half reaching only middle of wing; a dark discal dot before middle; an interrupted blackish line round termen, preceded by a greenish shade: cilia whitish-grey obscurely barred with fuscous. Hindwings beneath with a prominent blackish spot at 1/3 and a median chain of blackish spots sharply angulated at middle.

Hudson was of the opinion that the male of this species is much greener in its colouring than the female, but both sexes are characterised by the prevalence of pinkish suffusion.

== Distribution ==
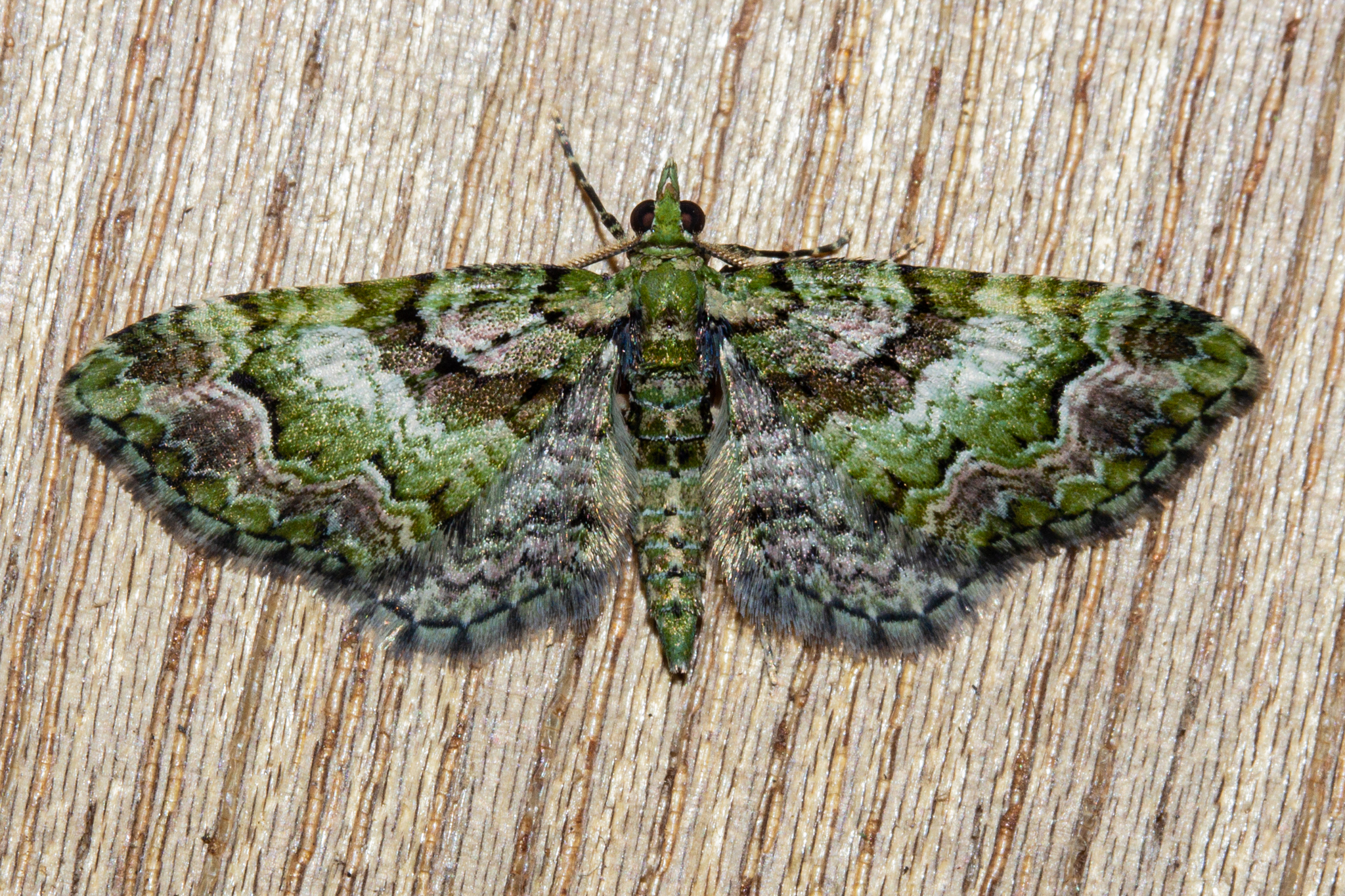
Live specimen.

This species is endemic to New Zealand and is found in both the North and South Islands.

== Habitat and hosts ==
This species inhabits native forest and scrub. Adults have been recorded as having an affiliation for Veronica.

== Behaviour ==
This species is commonly on the wing in November and December. Adults are attracted to light.
