= Pasiphila excisa =

Scientific classification
- Domain: Eukaryota
- Kingdom: Animalia
- Phylum: Arthropoda
- Class: Insecta
- Order: Lepidoptera
- Family: Geometridae
- Genus: Pasiphila
- Species: P. excisa

Binomial name
- Pasiphila excisa (Butler, 1878)

Synonyms
- Eupithecia excisa Butler, 1878; Chloroclystis excisa; Eupithecia macrocheila Staudinger, 1897

Species of moth

Pasiphila excisa is a moth in the family Geometridae. It was described by Arthur Gardiner Butler in 1878. It is found in Russia, Japan and Korea.

The larvae feed on the flowers of Rhododendron species and Eurya japonica.
