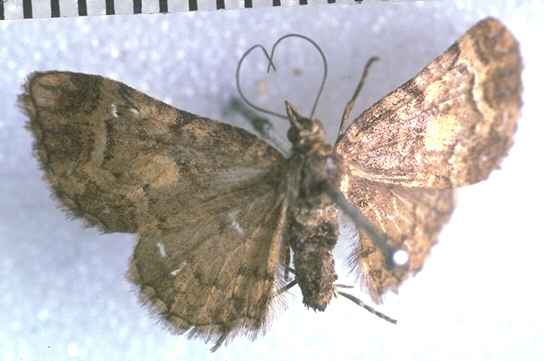
- Holotype specimen

Scientific classification
- Kingdom: Animalia
- Phylum: Arthropoda
- Class: Insecta
- Order: Lepidoptera
- Family: Geometridae
- Genus: Pasiphila
- Species: P. vieta

Binomial name
- Pasiphila vieta (Hudson, 1950)

Synonyms
- Chloroclystis vieta Hudson, 1950

= Pasiphila vieta =

Species of moth

Pasiphila vieta is a moth in the family Geometridae. It was first described by George Hudson in 1950. It is endemic to New Zealand and has been observed in Egmont National Park. Adults are on the wing in December.

== Taxonomy ==
This species was first described by George Hudson in 1950 using specimens collected by Amy Castle at Mount Taranaki at an elevation of 3,200ft and originally named Chloroclystis vieta. In 1971 John S. Dugdale placed this species in the genus Pasiphila. When confirming this placement in 1988 Dugdale raised the possibility that this species may be synonymous with Pasiphila lunata. The female holotype is held at Te Papa.

== Description ==
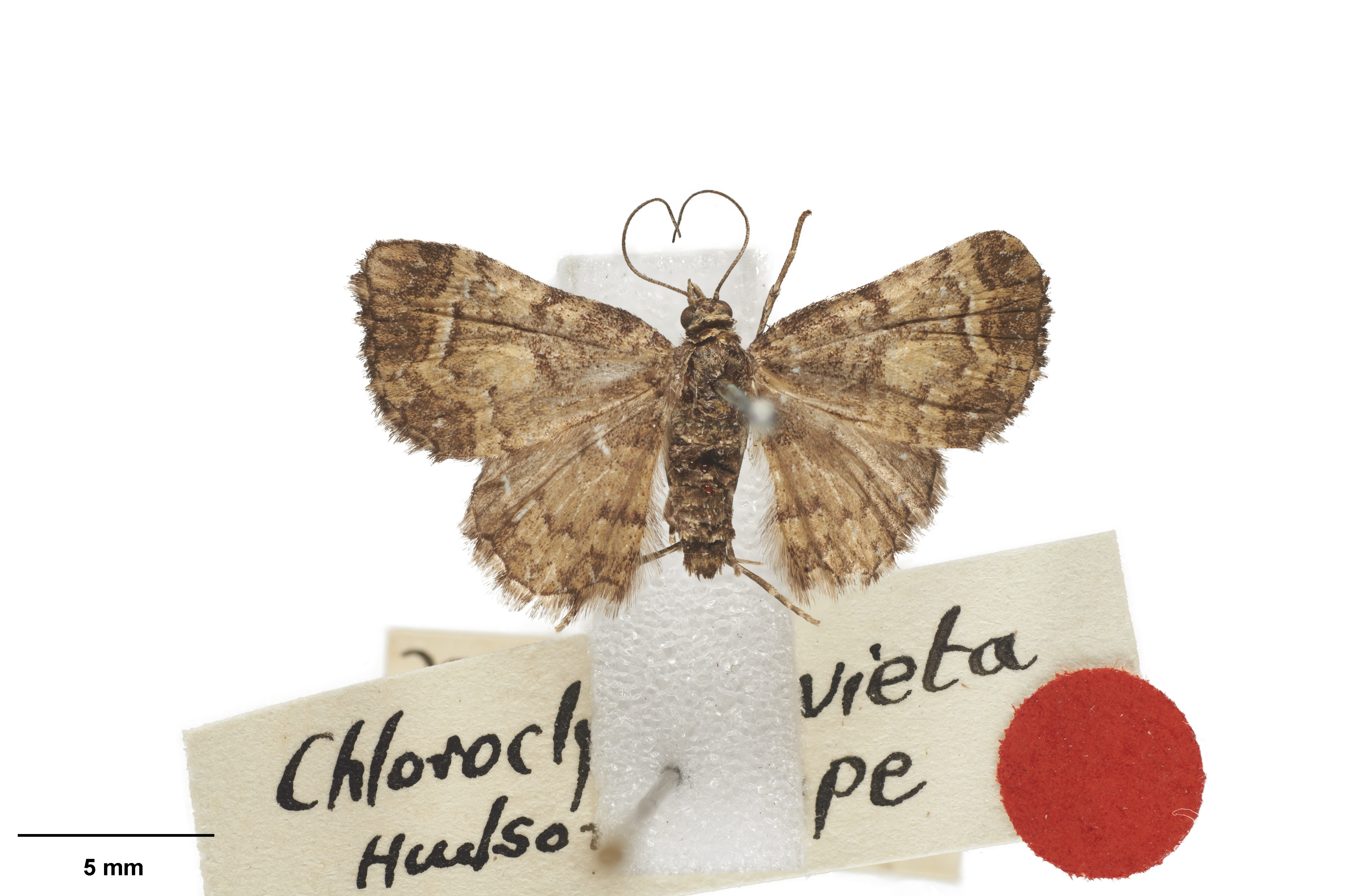
Holotype specimen of Pasiphila vieta.

Hudson described this species as follows:

The expansion of the wings of the female is slightly over 1 inch (21 mm.). The forewings are rather broad with the apex rounded and the termen slightly bowed outwards before tornus. The hindwings are rather small with the termen sinuate. All the wings are warm brownish-ochreous, with blackish markings. The forewings have a brown terminal band broadest at apex, interrupted near middle, and narrow at tornus; there is considerable blackish speckling on basal and terminal areas; the first line is heavily marked on costa, thence much lighter and rather indefinite; the median band is generally paler, especially in disc; the second line (outer edge of median band) has a very acute dentation just below costa, thence very sinuous, white-edged, with strong, irregular median projection; a narrow, but conspicuous paler band follows the median band; the terminal area is strongly black speckled and is traversed by an obscure whitish subterminal line. Hindwings with a dusky basal patch, and a broken, very jagged, median line. All the wings are clearly but finely outlined in blackish. Cilia brownish-ochreous, barred with blackish. The abdomen has a dark band near base.

== Distribution ==
This species is endemic to New Zealand and has been collected at Egmont National Park.

== Behaviour ==
Adults of this species are on the wing in December.
