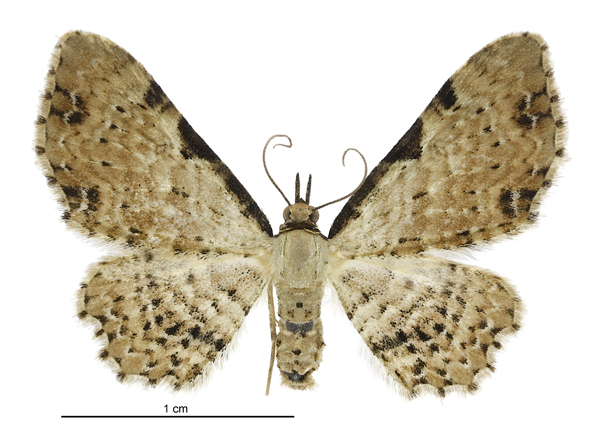
- Female

Scientific classification
- Kingdom: Animalia
- Phylum: Arthropoda
- Class: Insecta
- Order: Lepidoptera
- Family: Geometridae
- Genus: Pasiphila
- Species: P. fumipalpata

Binomial name
- Pasiphila fumipalpata (Felder & Rogenhofer, 1875)

Synonyms
- Eupithecia fumipalpata Felder & Rogenhofer, 1875; Chloroclystis fumipalpata (Felder & Rogenhofer, 1875); Chloroclystis maculata Hudson, 1898

= Pasiphila fumipalpata =

Species of moth endemic to New Zealand

Pasiphila fumipalpata is a moth of the family Geometridae. This species was first described by Baron Cajetan von Felder and Alois Friedrich Rogenhofer in 1875. It is endemic to New Zealand and has been observed on both the North and South Islands. However this species is regarded as rare. P. fulmipalpata inhabits native bush and adults are on the wing from December until February. They are attracted to light.

== Taxonomy ==
This species was first described by Baron Cajetan von Felder and Alois Friedrich Rogenhofer in 1875 and originally named Eupithecia fumipalpata. In 1898 George Hudson, thinking he was describing a new species, named this moth Chloroclystis maculata. This name was synonymised with Chloroclystis fumipalpata by Alfred Philpott in 1926. Hudson accepted this synonymisation and discussed and illustrated this species under the name Chloroclystis fumipalpata in his 1928 book The butterflies and moths of New Zealand. In 1971 John S. Dugdale placed this species back in the genus Pasiphila. The female holotype, collected by T. R. Oxley in Nelson, is held at the Natural History Museum, London.

== Description ==
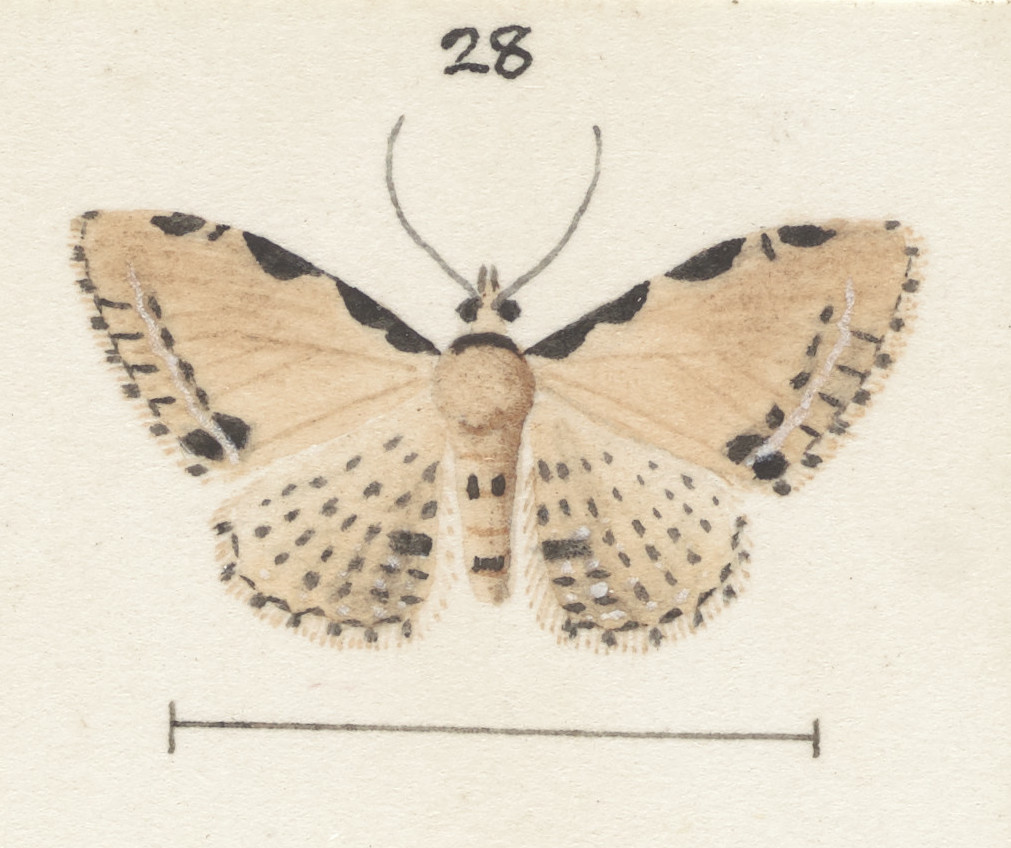
Illustration by Hudson.

George Hudson described the adults of this species as follows:

The expansion of the wings is about 7/8 inch. All the wings are creamy-white slightly tinged with warm brown or greenish-grey. The fore-wings have several irregular large black marks on the costa extending about two-thirds towards the apex; there is a curved transverse series of black dots at about two-thirds, and several irregular black marks on the termen near the middle and at the tornus. The termen of the hind-wings is irregular; there are numerous rows of black spots darkest near the dorsum. The cilia are cream-coloured strongly barred with black. All the wings have a wavy white subterminal line.

== Distribution ==
This species is endemic to New Zealand. It is located in both the North and South Islands but is regarded as being relatively rare.

== Habitat and hosts ==
This species inhabits native forest.

== Behaviour ==
Adults are on the wing from December until February and are attracted to light.
