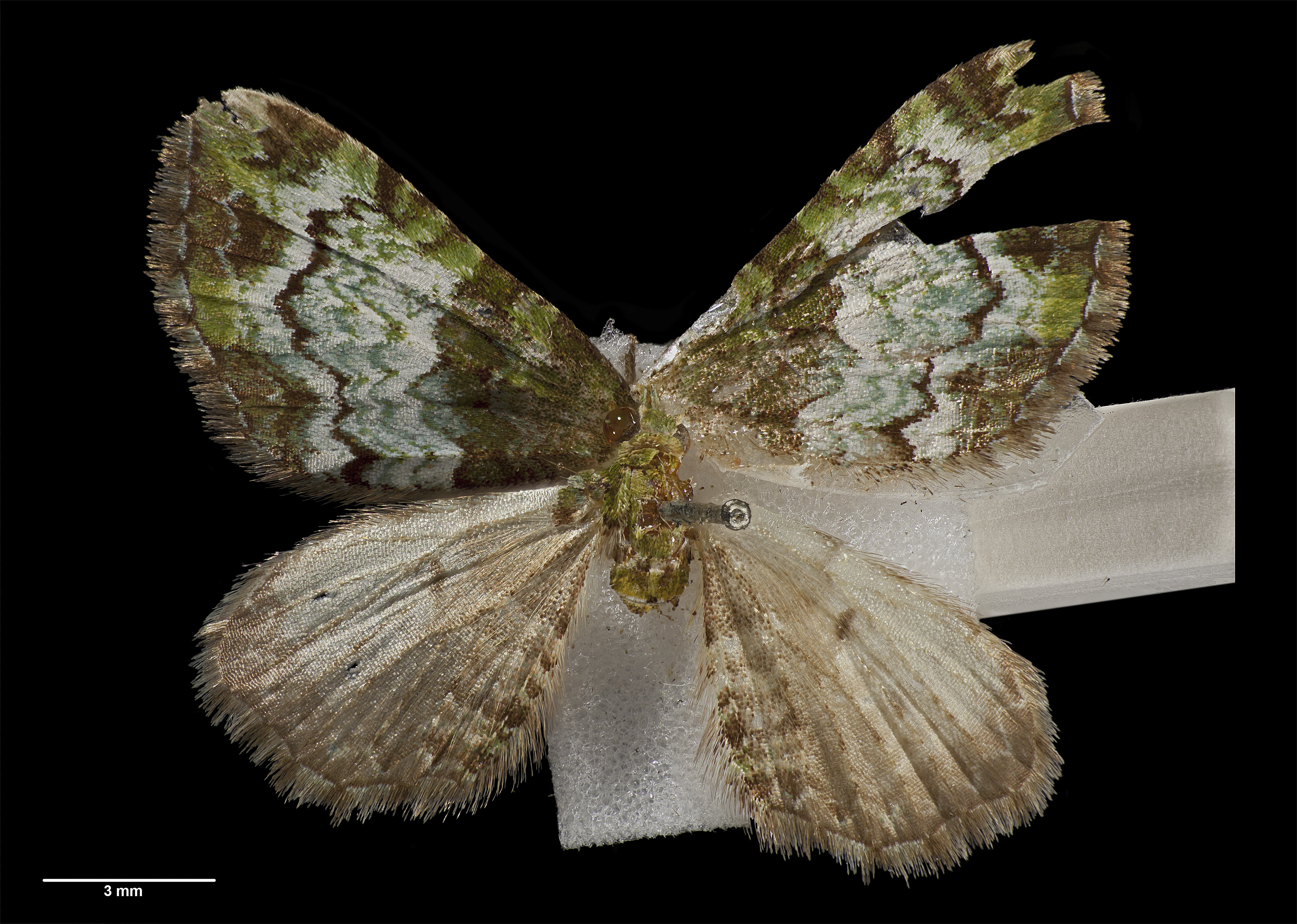
- Male syntype specimen held at the Auckland War Memorial Museum.
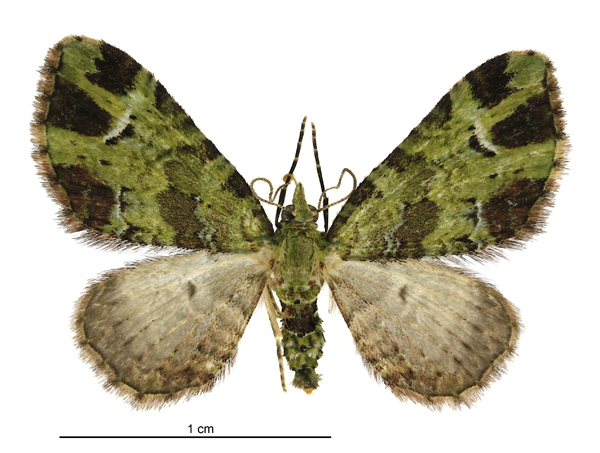
- Female specimen.

Scientific classification
- Kingdom: Animalia
- Phylum: Arthropoda
- Class: Insecta
- Order: Lepidoptera
- Family: Geometridae
- Genus: Pasiphila
- Species: P. malachita

Binomial name
- Pasiphila malachita (Meyrick, 1913)

Synonyms
- Chloroclystis malachita Meyrick, 1913; Chloroclystis luminosa Philpott, 1915

= Pasiphila malachita =

Species of moth endemic to New Zealand

Pasiphila malachita is a moth of the family Geometridae. This species was first described by Edward Meyrick in 1913. It is endemic to New Zealand and is found in the North and South Islands. This species inhabits native forest and larvae feed on Veronica species. Adults are most commonly observed on the wing in December and January. They are attracted to light.

== Taxonomy ==
This species was first described by Edward Meyrick in 1913 collected at Lake Harris and Lake Wakatipu by George Hudson and originally named Chloroclystis malachita. In 1928 Hudson illustrated and discussed this species under that name in his book The butterflies and moths of New Zealand. In 1971 John S. Dugdale placed this species in the genus Pasiphila. The male lectotype specimen, collected at Lake Harris, is held at the Natural History Museum, London.

== Description ==
Meyrick described the adults of this species as follows:

♂♀. 19-25 mm. Palpi 1 2/3-1 3/4. Antenna! ciliations 1. Abdomen with blackish antemedian band. Forewings triangular, termen bowed, rather oblique ; bright moss-green, sometimes partially tinged with yellowish, in one specimen partly brownish on basal area ; some indistinct darker-green transverse striae, partially marked with blackish, especially towards costa ; posterior edge of median band marked above middle with a black lunule edged with white posteriorly, and irregularly marked with black towards dorsum ; a well-defined blackish blotch on costa towards apex ; well- defined blackish blotches on termen above middle and on tornus, cut by a fine waved greenish subterminal stria, tornal blotch more or less suffused with dark brown-reddish : cilia brownish, base greenish, suffusedly barred with blackish. Hindwings with termen somewhat unevenly rounded ; pale- greyish, towards dorsum tinged with brown-reddish and striated with dark grey : cilia pale-greyish, more or less rosy-tinged, and indistinctly spotted with dark-grey suffusion.

Hudson states that this species varies in appearance with the depth of the ground colour being different shades of green and is sometimes yellowish. The blackish red markings also vary in intensity.

== Distribution ==
This species is endemic to New Zealand. It is found in both the North and South Islands. Hudson regarded this species as rare.

== Habitat and hosts ==
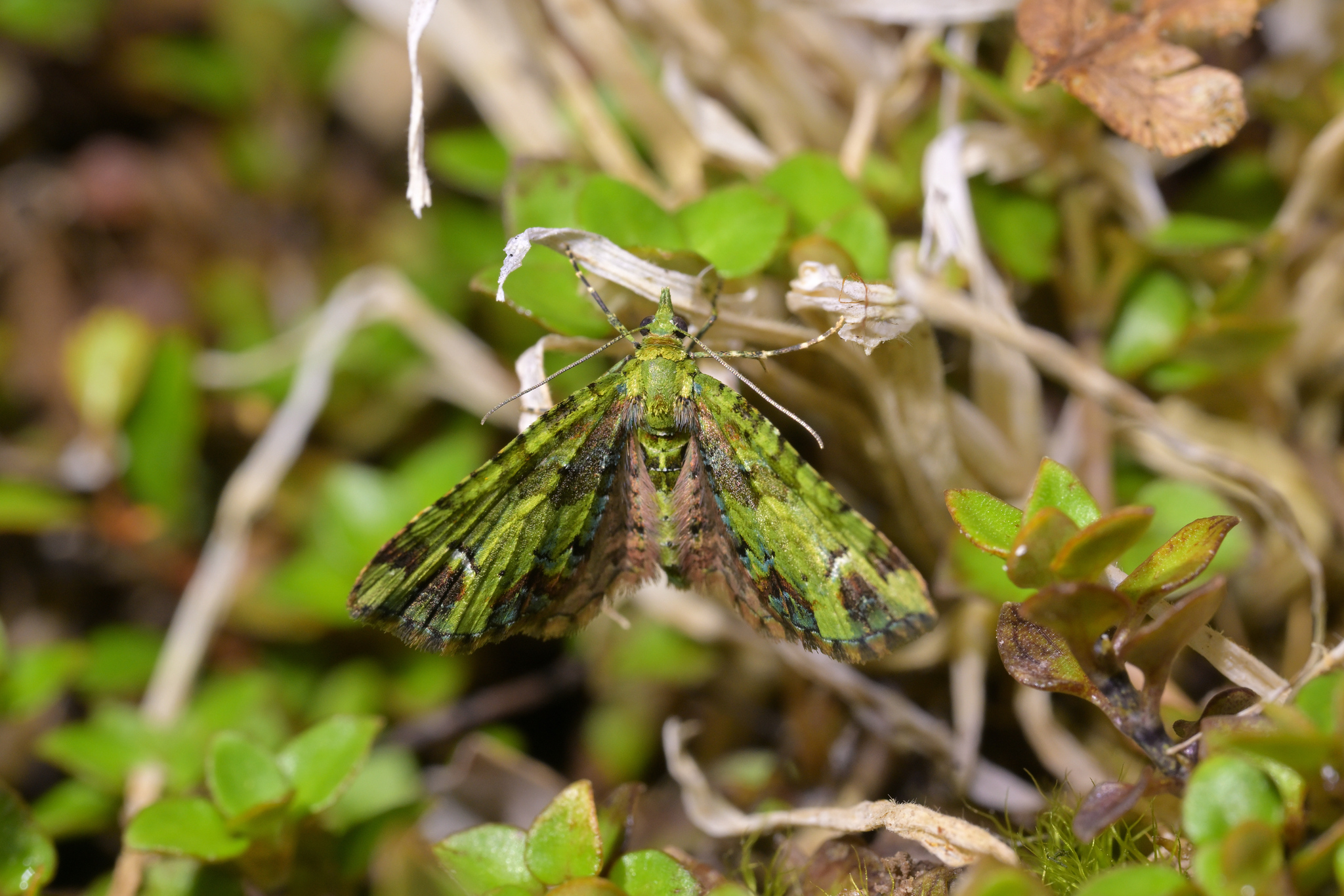
Living specimen.

This species inhabits native forest. The larvae feed on Veronica species.

== Behaviour ==
Adults are most frequently observed on the wing in December and January and are attracted to light.
