= Pasiphila socotrensis =

Scientific classification
- Domain: Eukaryota
- Kingdom: Animalia
- Phylum: Arthropoda
- Class: Insecta
- Order: Lepidoptera
- Family: Geometridae
- Genus: Pasiphila
- Species: P. socotrensis

Binomial name
- Pasiphila socotrensis (Herbulot, 1994)

Synonyms
- Chloroclystis socotrensis Herbulot, 1994

Species of moth

Pasiphila socotrensis is a moth in the family Geometridae. It is found in Yemen (Socotra).
