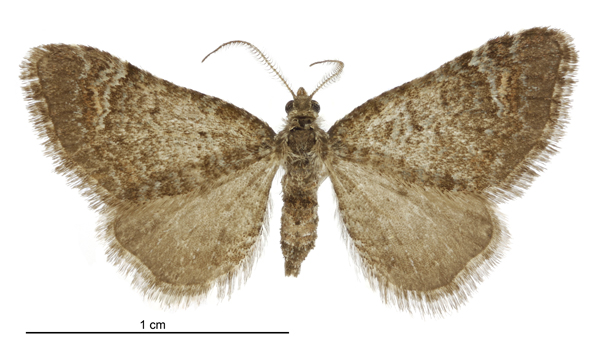
- Male

Scientific classification
- Kingdom: Animalia
- Phylum: Arthropoda
- Clade: Pancrustacea
- Class: Insecta
- Order: Lepidoptera
- Family: Geometridae
- Genus: Pasiphila
- Species: P. furva

Binomial name
- Pasiphila furva (Philpott, 1917)

Synonyms
- Chloroclystis furva Philpott, 1917

= Pasiphila furva =

Species of moth endemic to New Zealand

Pasiphila furva is a species of moth of the family Geometridae. It was first described by Alfred Philpott in 1917. This species is endemic to New Zealand and has been observed in the Fiordland region. This species inhabits subalpine scrub and are said to be associated with Veronica odora. Adult moths are on the wing in January.

== Taxonomy ==
This species was first described by Alfred Philpott in 1917 and originally named Chloroclystis furva using specimens collected in Mount Cleughearn at 3,200 ft. In 1928 George Hudson illustrated and discussed this species under that name in his book The butterflies and moths of New Zealand. In 1971 John S. Dugdale placed this species in the genus Pasiphila. The male holotype, collected by Philpott at Mount Cleughearn in the Hunter Mountains, is held at the New Zealand Arthropod Collection.

== Description ==
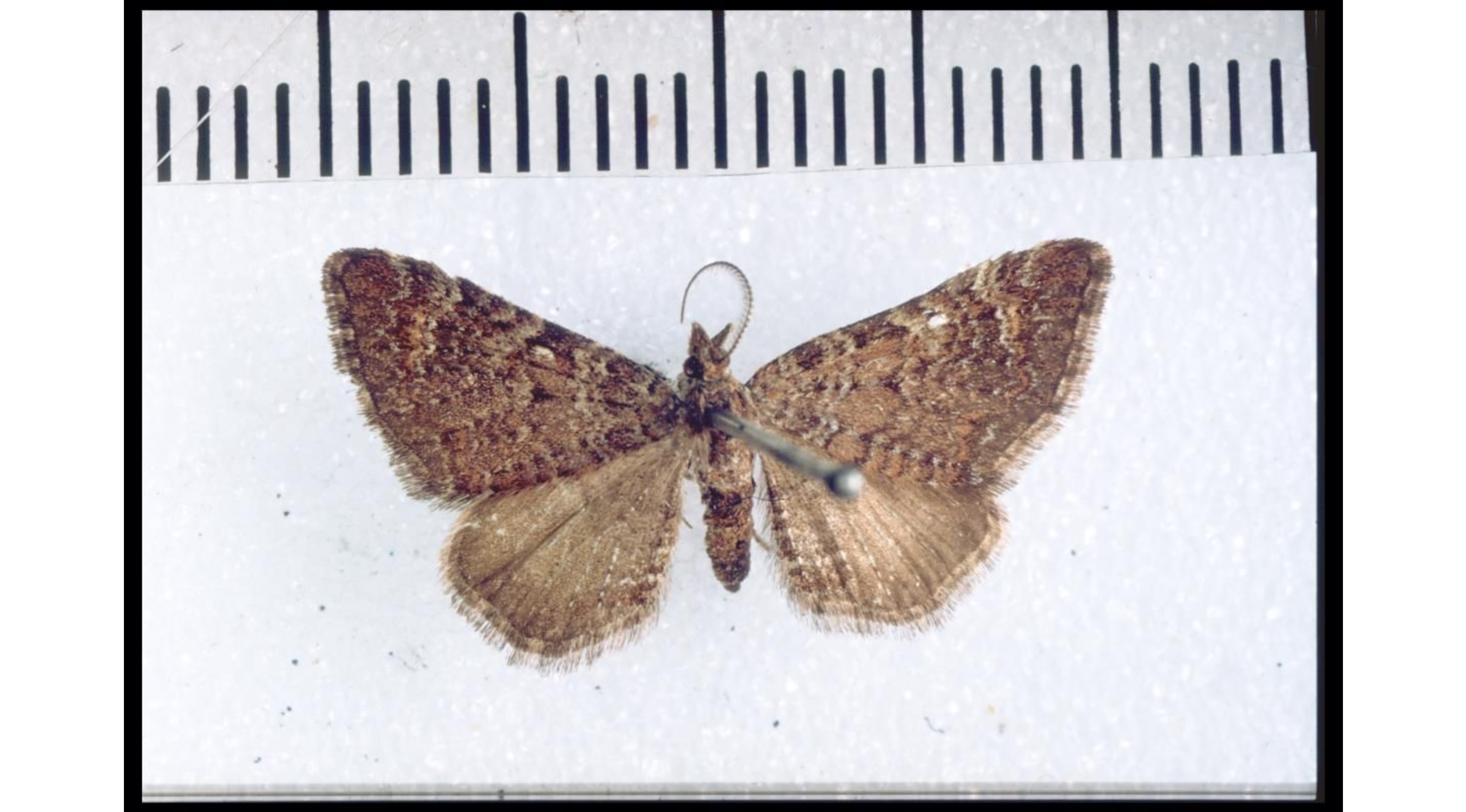
Male holotype of P. furva.

Philpott originally described this species as follows:

♂. 17-20 mm. Head, palpi, thorax, and abdomen dark reddish-brown whitish, in ♂ ciliate-fasciculate, ciliations 4. Forewings triangular, costa slightly sinuate, apex obtuse, termen angulated at middle, subsinuate beneath; dark dull-reddish-brown; numerous obscure bluish-green and, black transverse lines; upper half o: second line frequently more prominently greenish and followed by a rather broad reddish band; a thin waved bluish-green subterminal line usually present : cilia fuscous-grey, suffusedly barred and mixed with darker. Hind wings in ♂ slightly but broadly projecting on middle of termen; dark greyish-fuscous; veins dotted with whitish scales; dorsal fasciae hardly indicated : cilia as in forewings.

== Distribution ==
This species is endemic to New Zealand. This species has been observed in the Fiordland region.

== Habitat and hosts ==
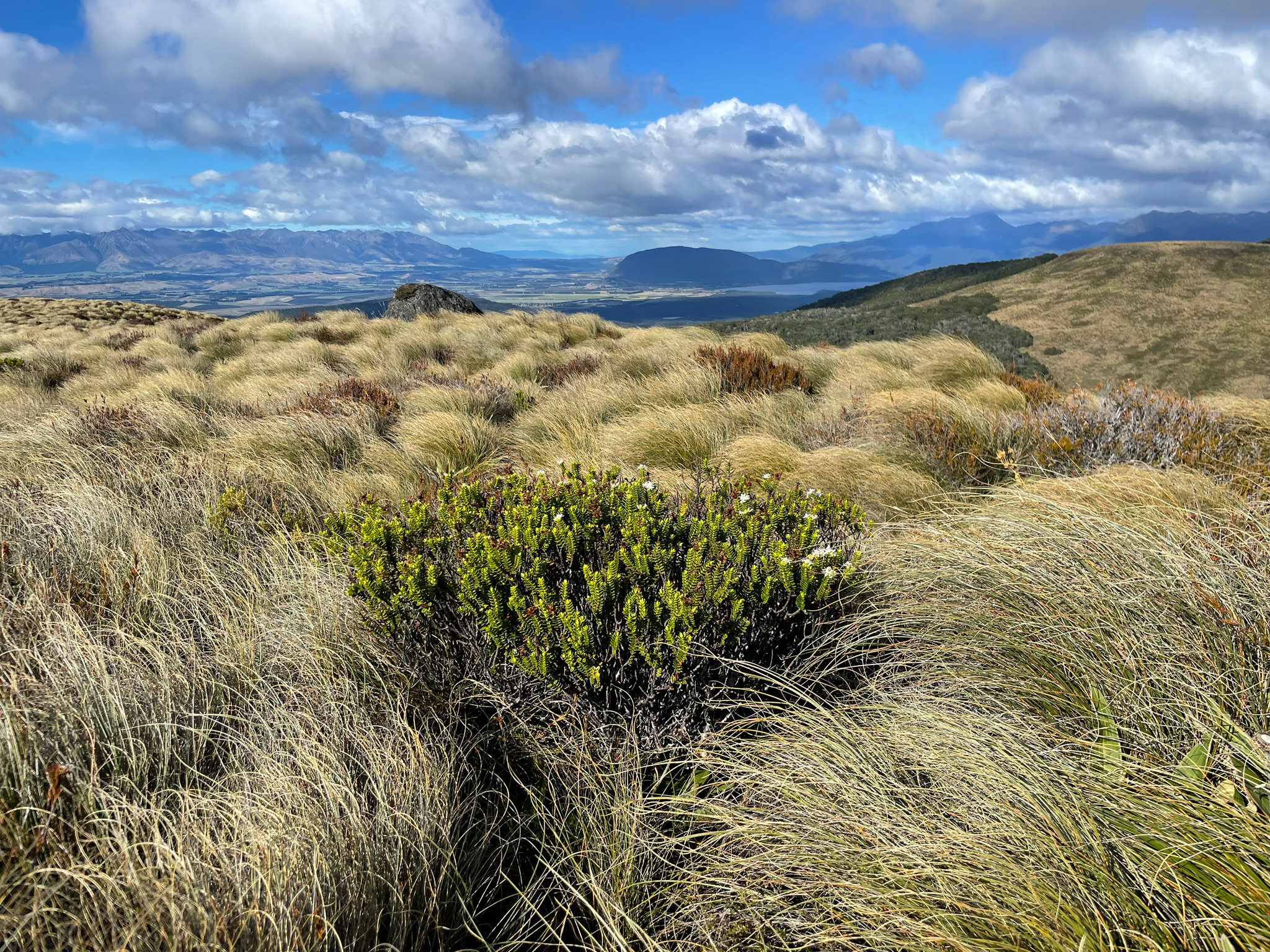
Veronica odora in the Fiordland National Park.

This species inhabits subalpine scrub and is said to be associated with Veronica odora.

== Behaviour ==
Adults are on the wing in January.
