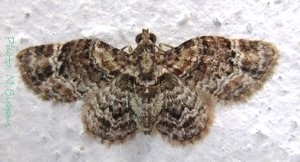
- Male

Scientific classification
- Kingdom: Animalia
- Phylum: Arthropoda
- Class: Insecta
- Order: Lepidoptera
- Family: Geometridae
- Genus: Pasiphila
- Species: P. derasata

Binomial name
- Pasiphila derasata (Bastelberger, 1905)

Synonyms
- Gullaca derasata Bastelberger, 1905; Chloroclystis derasata; Chloroclystis chlamydata de Joannis, 1906; Chloroclystis jansei Prout, 1937

= Pasiphila derasata =

Species of moth

Pasiphila derasata is a species of moth in the family Geometridae. It is found in Africa, south of the Sahara, including the Islands of the Atlantic Ocean (Cabo Verde) and the island of the Indian Ocean.

The wingspan of this moth is about 14–18 millimetres (0.55–0.71 in). The edge of the forewings of the males have a convex shape that makes it easy to distinguish them from the females.
