= Pasiphila lita =

Scientific classification
- Kingdom: Animalia
- Phylum: Arthropoda
- Clade: Pancrustacea
- Class: Insecta
- Order: Lepidoptera
- Family: Geometridae
- Genus: Pasiphila
- Species: P. lita

Binomial name
- Pasiphila lita (Prout, 1916)

Synonyms
- Chloroclystis lita Prout, 1916; Mesocolpia lita

Species of moth

Pasiphila lita is a moth in the family Geometridae. It was described by Louis Beethoven Prout in 1916. It is found in Kenya, Malawi, South Africa and Zimbabwe.
