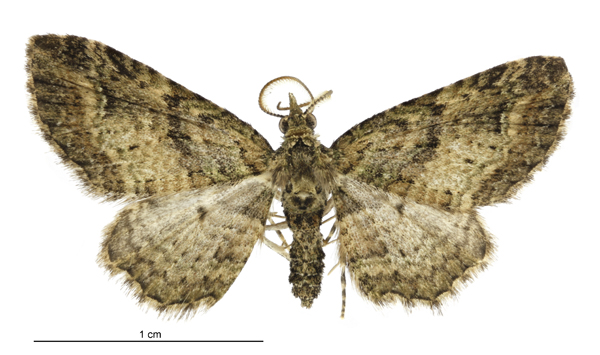

Scientific classification
- Kingdom: Animalia
- Phylum: Arthropoda
- Class: Insecta
- Order: Lepidoptera
- Family: Geometridae
- Genus: Pasiphila
- Species: P. charybdis

Binomial name
- Pasiphila charybdis (Butler, 1879)

Synonyms
- Helastia charybdis Butler, 1879; Chloroclystis charybdis (Butler, 1879); Helastia calida Butler, 1879; Chloroclystis antarctica Hudson, 1898

= Pasiphila charybdis =

Species of moth

Pasiphila charybdis is a species of moth in the family Geometridae. It was first described by Arthur Gardiner Butler in 1879. This species is endemic to New Zealand and has been observed in the southern parts of the South Island. The larvae feed on Veronica species and adults are on the wing in December.

== Taxonomy ==
This species was first described by Arthur Gardiner Butler in 1879 and named Helastia charybdis using specimens collected by F. W. Hutton in Dunedin. In 1879, thinking he was describing a new species, Butler also named this species Helastia calida. George Hudson, also thinking he was describing a new species, named it Chloroclystis antarctica in 1898. In 1917 Meyrick placed this species within the genus Chloroclystis and synonymised Helastia calida with it. Hudson discussed Chloroclystis charybdis in his 1928 book The butterflies and moths of New Zealand but said he was unacquainted with the species. In 1971 John S. Dugdale placed this species in the genus Pasiphila. Dugdale confirmed this placement in 1988 and synonymised C. antarctica with P. charydbis. The male holotype specimen is held at the Natural History Museum, London.

== Description ==
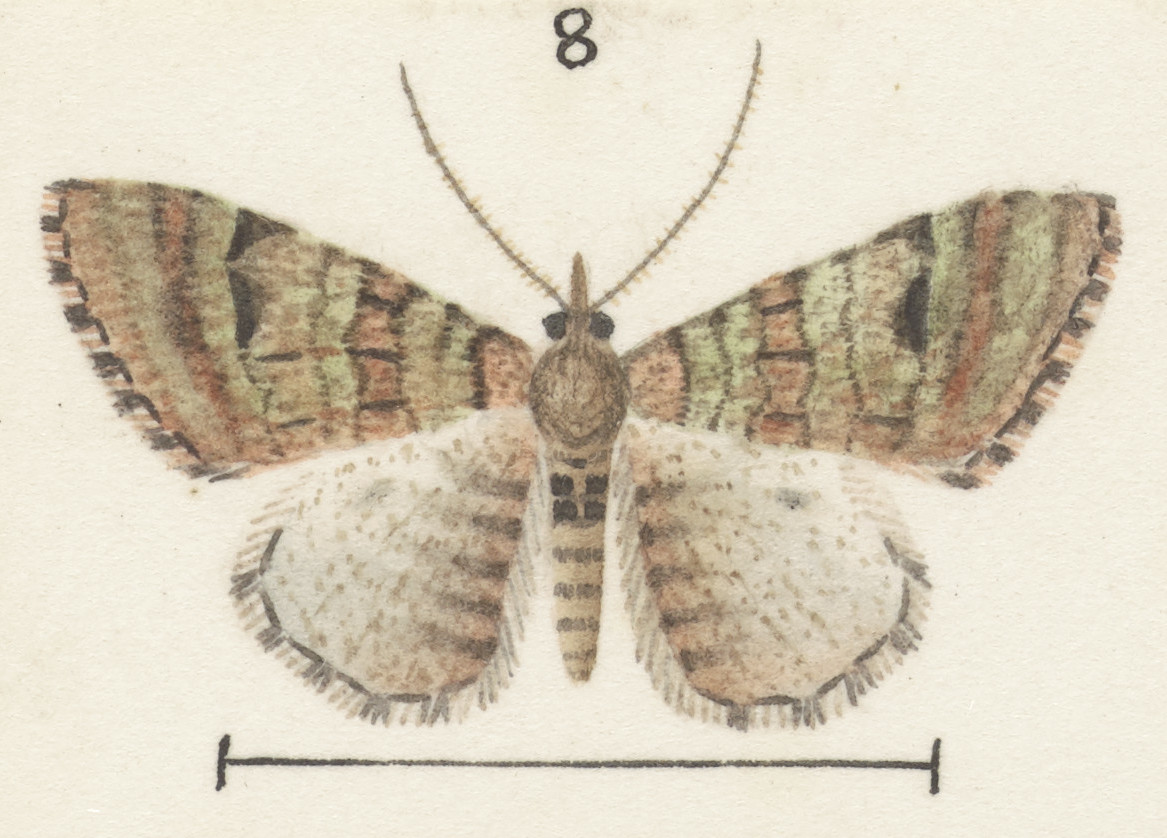
Illustration of P. charybdis by Hudson.

Hudson described the larvae of this species as follows:

The larva of this species, which feeds on the common Veronica in December, is, when full-grown, about 3/4 in. in length, rather attenuated anteriorly, almost uniform, dark reddish-brown, darker on the sides. The head is reddish, and there are traces of several longitudinal lines in younger larvae. Others are dull yellowish-brown, with the lines plainer and the prolegs pale-yellow; but as the larva is so extremely variable a detailed description hardly appears possible.

Butler described the adults of this species as follows:

... primaries above smoky-grey, crossed by about eight zigzag blackish lines in pairs, forming indications of four bands which are most strongly defined upon the costa; a whitish-edged black lunule between the last two bands; the last band partially filled in with sandy-whitish and brown; fringe whitish flesh-coloured intersected by a grey line and interrupted at the terminations of the veins by blackish spots; secondaries pale smoky-grey, the veins black spotted with whitish; extreme outer margin black; fringe as in the primaries; body brownish-grey, head yellowish; antennae smoky-grey, strongly pectinated; under surface sericeous grey; markings of upper surface ill-defined; discocellulars black; primaries with pale reddish cupreous costal area; secondaries with a series of short black dashes beyond the cell; fringe paler than the rest of the wings, spotted with dark grey. Expanse of wings 10 1/2 lines.

When discussing this species Dugdale stated:

Gathered under this name are the intricately patterned brown and green "species" with one spine-like cornutus on the aedeagal vesica.

== Distribution ==
This species is endemic to New Zealand and has been observed in southern parts of the South Island.

== Habitat and hosts ==
The larval hosts of this species are plants in the genus Veronica. Larvae have been successfully raised on Veronica species with species used being named Hebe elliptica.

== Life cycle ==
The pupa of this species can be found enfolded with silk between two leaves of its larval host. The adults of this species are on the wing from December.
