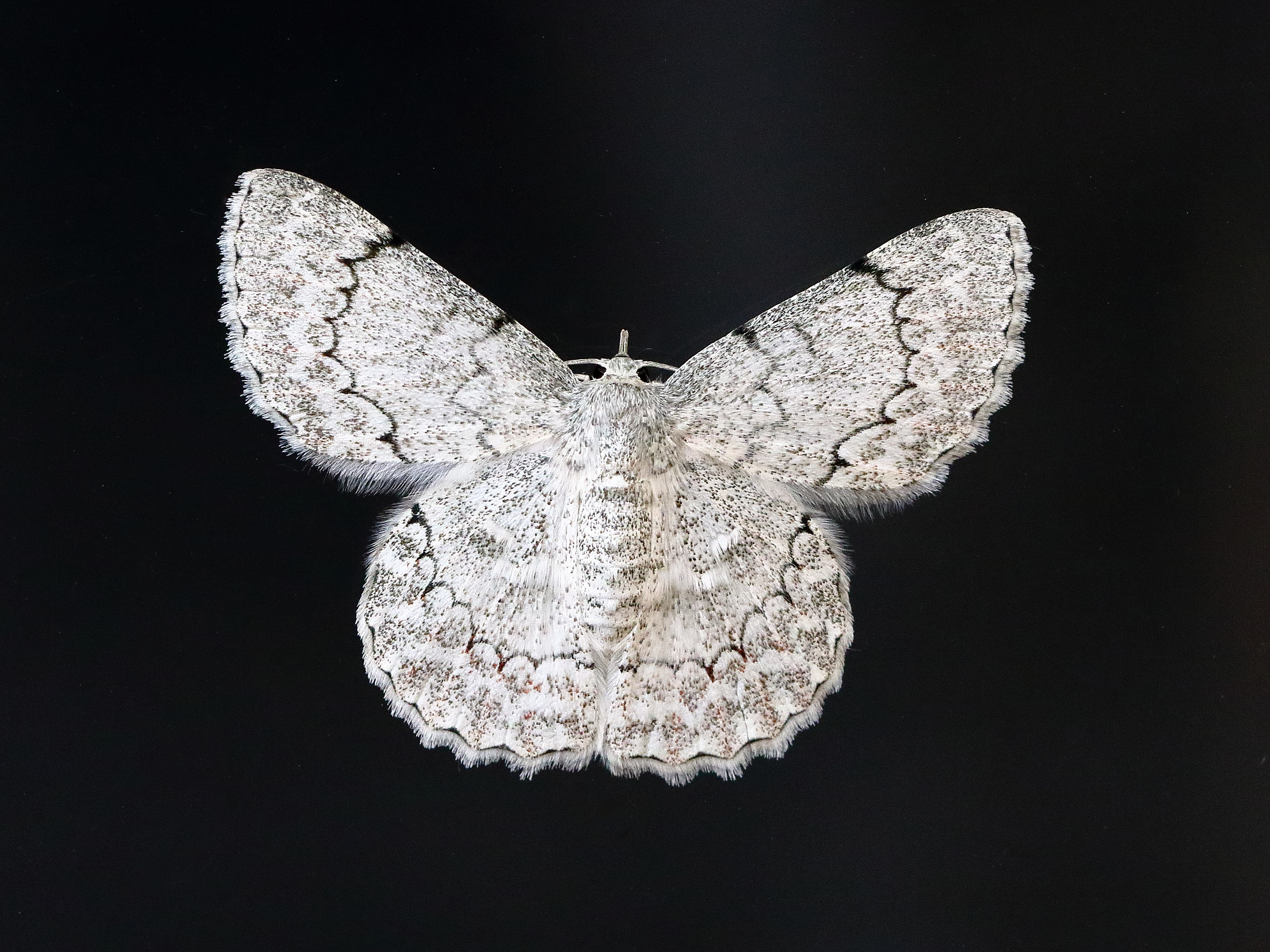
- Dorsal view
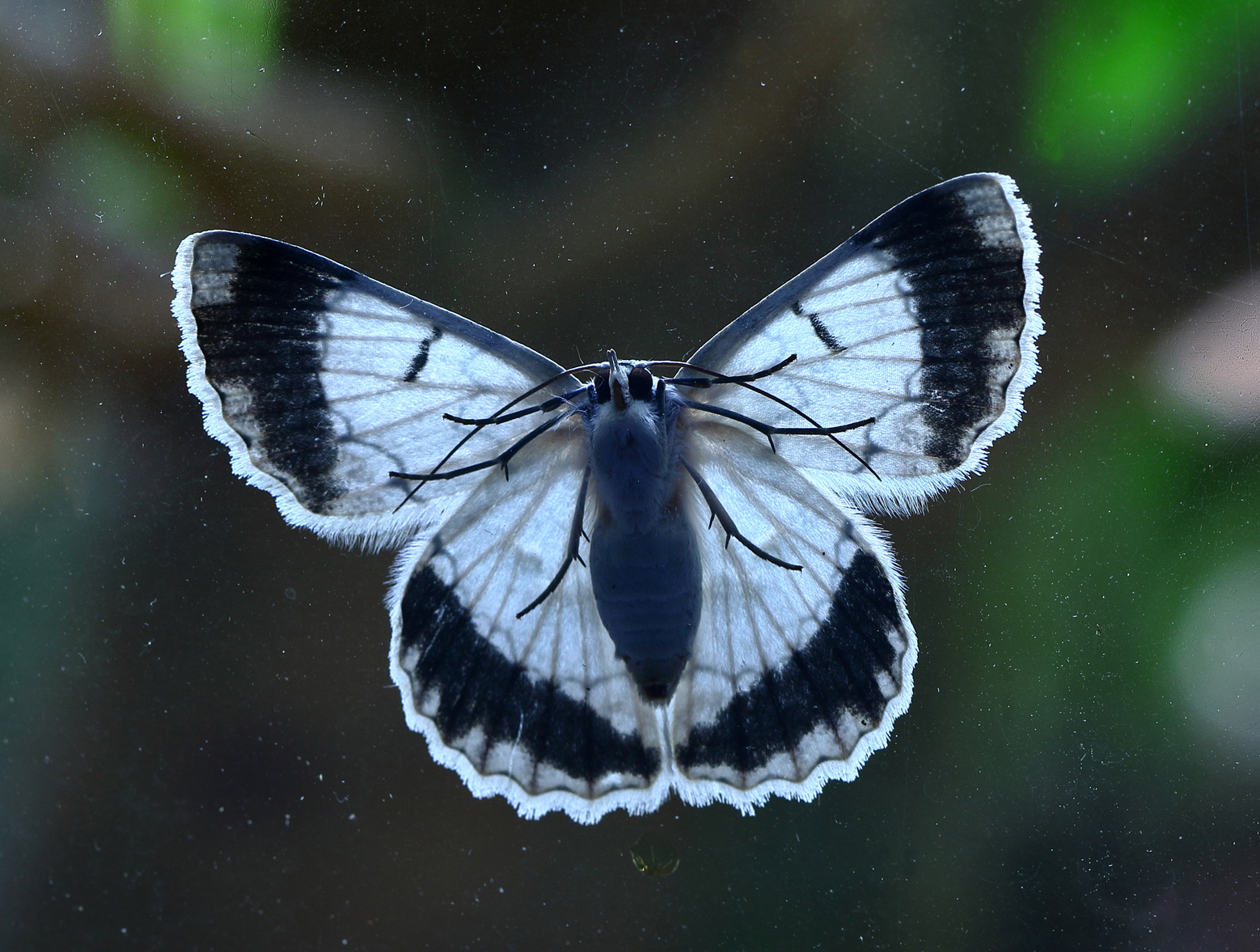
- Ventral view

Scientific classification
- Kingdom: Animalia
- Phylum: Arthropoda
- Clade: Pancrustacea
- Class: Insecta
- Order: Lepidoptera
- Family: Geometridae
- Genus: Pingasa
- Species: P. chlora

Binomial name
- Pingasa chlora (Stoll, [1782])

Synonyms
- Phalaena chlora Stoll, 1782; Hypochroma sublimbata Butler, 1882; Pingasa candidaria Warren, 1894; Pingasa latifascia Warren, 1894; Pingasa subdentata Warren, 1894; Pseudoterpna ecchloraria Hubner, 1823; Hypochroma chloraria Guenée, [1858]; Pseudoterpna ecchloraria Hübner, [1823]; Hypochroma paulinaria Pagenstecher, 1885

= Pingasa chlora =

Species of moth

Pingasa chlora, the white looper moth or flower-eating caterpillar, is a species of moth of the family Geometridae first described by Caspar Stoll in 1782. It is found in Sundaland, the Philippines, Sulawesi and from the Moluccas to Queensland, Australia.

Larvae have been reared on leaves of Euroschinus and from Flindersia species. It is considered a pest on Nephelium lappaceum and Litchi chinensis in Australia. Other recorded food plants include Euroschinus falcata, Rhodomyrtus tomentosa and Flindersia schottiana.

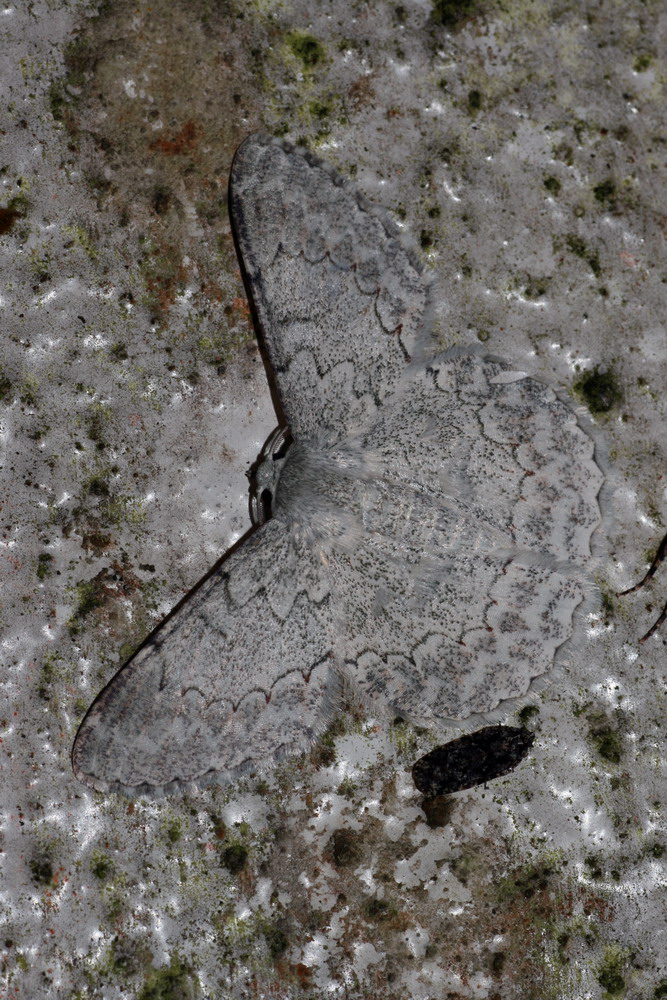
Fraser's Hill, Malaysia

== Subspecies ==
- Pingasa chlora chlora (Stoll, 1782)
- Pingasa chlora candidaria Warren, 1894
- Pingasa chlora subdentata Warren, 1894
- Pingasa chlora sublimbata (Butler, 1882)
