= Pingasa lahayei =

Scientific classification
- Kingdom: Animalia
- Phylum: Arthropoda
- Clade: Pancrustacea
- Class: Insecta
- Order: Lepidoptera
- Family: Geometridae
- Genus: Pingasa
- Species: P. lahayei

Binomial name
- Pingasa lahayei (Oberthür, 1887)

Synonyms
- Hypochroma lahayei Oberthür, 1887

Species of moth

Pingasa lahayei is a moth of the family Geometridae first described by Charles Oberthür in 1887. It is found in Spain, North Africa and tropical Africa, including the Gambia.

The larvae feed on Rhus tripartita and Zizyphus lotus.

== Subspecies ==
- Pingasa lahayei lahayei (southern Spain, North Africa)
- Pingasa lahayei austrina Prout, 1917 (tropical Africa, including the Gambia, Nigeria, Zimbabwe, Eswatini)

Pingasa multispurcata is often treated as a subspecies of Pingasa lahayei.
