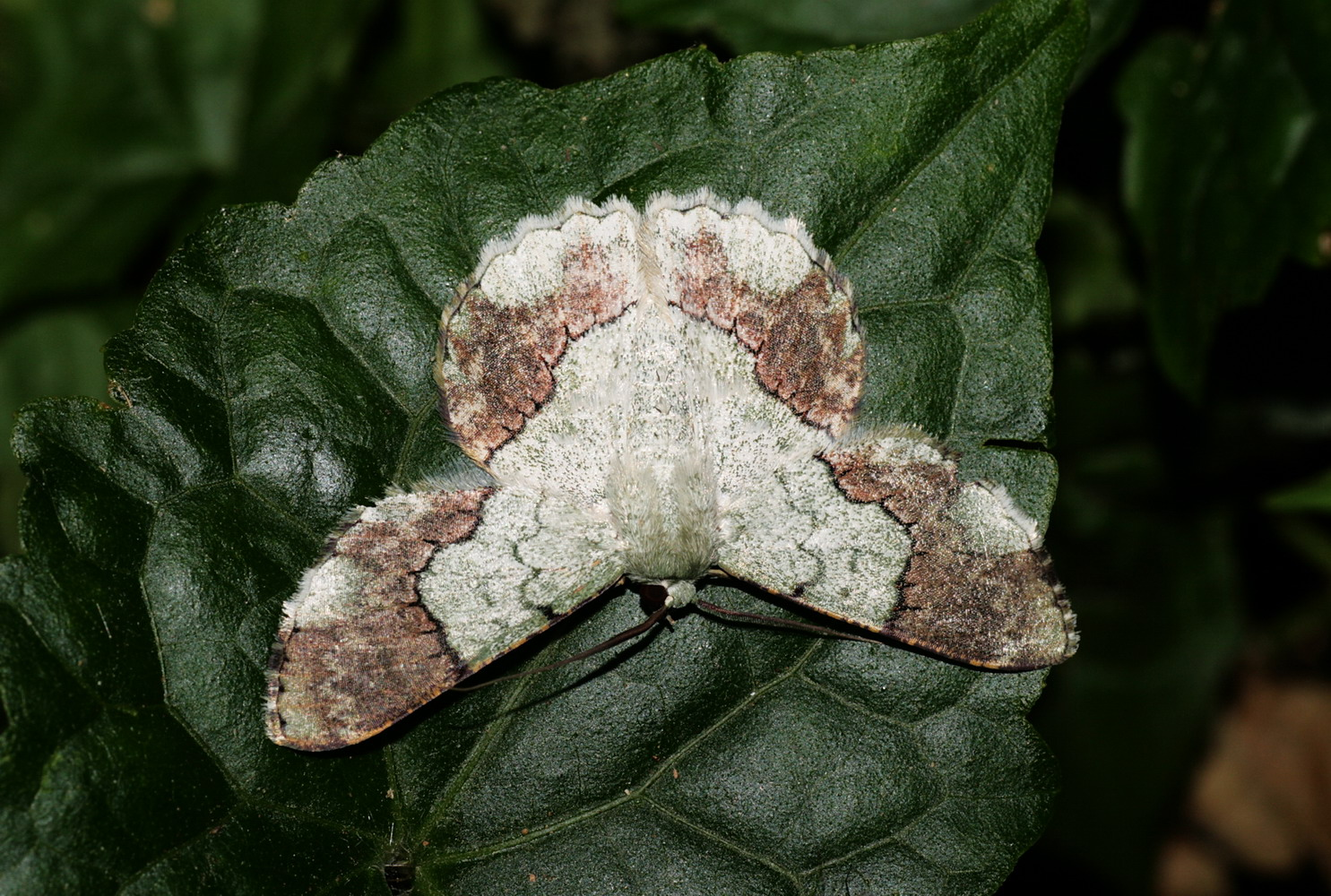
- Dorsal view
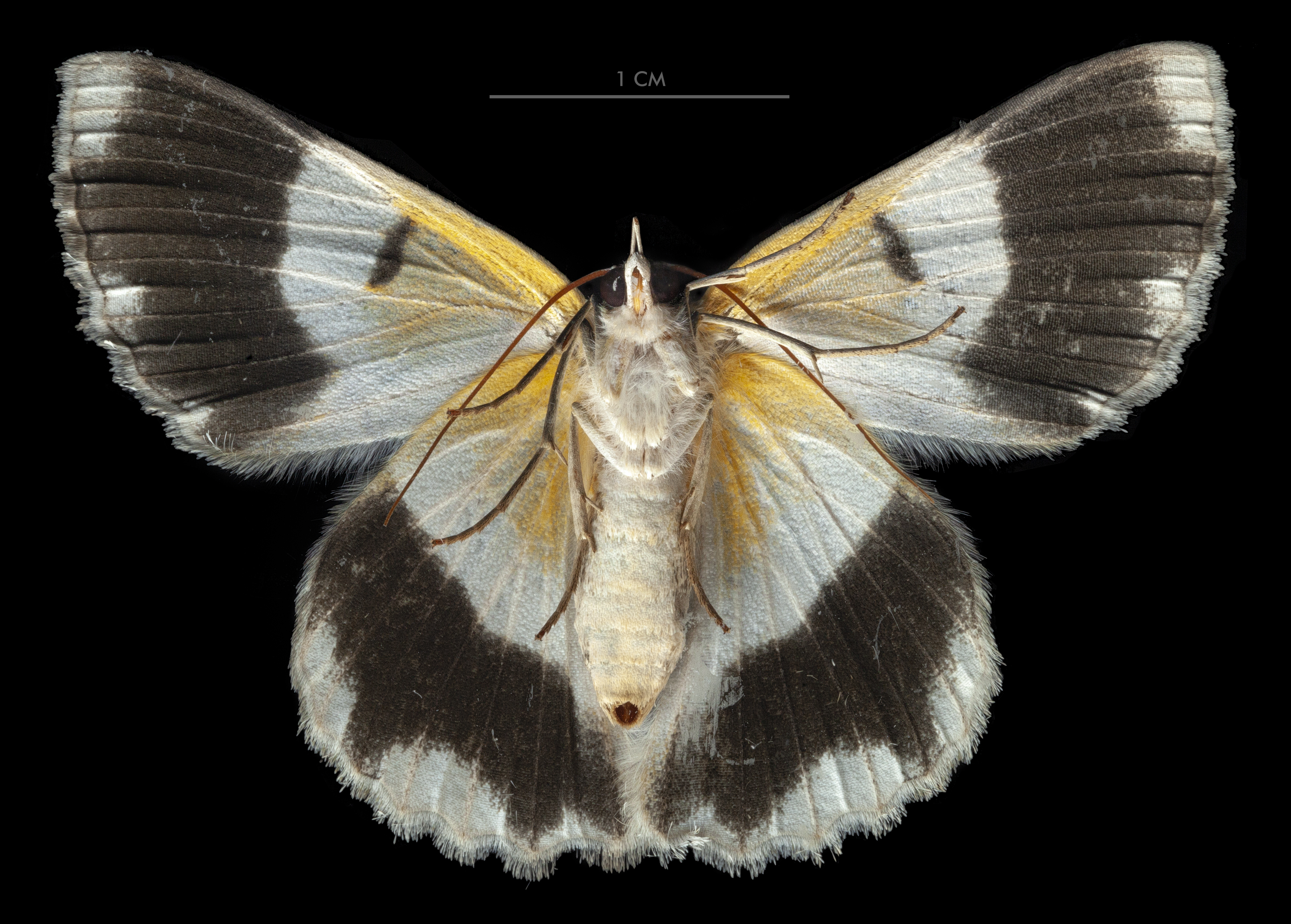
- Ventral view

Scientific classification
- Kingdom: Animalia
- Phylum: Arthropoda
- Clade: Pancrustacea
- Class: Insecta
- Order: Lepidoptera
- Family: Geometridae
- Genus: Pingasa
- Species: P. ruginaria

Binomial name
- Pingasa ruginaria (Guenée, 1857)

Synonyms
- Hypochroma ruginaria Guenée, 1857; Hypochroma perfectaria Walker, 1860; Hypochroma nyctemerata Walker, 1860; Hypochroma batiaria Plötz, 1880

= Pingasa ruginaria =

Species of moth

Pingasa ruginaria is a species of moth of the family Geometridae first described by Achille Guenée in 1857. It is found in India, south-east Asia, the Ryukyu Islands and Sundaland.

The larvae have been recorded on Rhus, Liquidambar, Cinnamomum, Litsea, Crotalaria, Nephelium, Trema and Sterculiaceae species.

== Subspecies ==
- Pingasa ruginaria ruginaria (Guenée, [1858])
- Pingasa ruginaria andamanica Prout, 1916
- ?Pingasa ruginaria communicans (Walker, 1860)
- Pingasa ruginaria commutata (Walker, 1860)
- Pingasa ruginaria interrupta Warren, 1901
- Pingasa ruginaria pacifica Inoue, 1964
