= Pingasa herbuloti =

Scientific classification
- Kingdom: Animalia
- Phylum: Arthropoda
- Clade: Pancrustacea
- Class: Insecta
- Order: Lepidoptera
- Family: Geometridae
- Genus: Pingasa
- Species: P. herbuloti

Binomial name
- Pingasa herbuloti Viette, 1971

Species of moth

Pingasa herbuloti is a moth of the family Geometridae first described by Pierre Viette in 1971. It is found on Madagascar.
