= Pingasa serrativalvis =

Scientific classification
- Kingdom: Animalia
- Phylum: Arthropoda
- Clade: Pancrustacea
- Class: Insecta
- Order: Lepidoptera
- Family: Geometridae
- Genus: Pingasa
- Species: P. serrativalvis

Binomial name
- Pingasa serrativalvis Herbulot, 2000

Species of moth

Pingasa serrativalvis is a moth of the family Geometridae first described by Claude Herbulot in 2000. It is found in Tanzania.
