= Pingasa javensis =

Scientific classification
- Kingdom: Animalia
- Phylum: Arthropoda
- Clade: Pancrustacea
- Class: Insecta
- Order: Lepidoptera
- Family: Geometridae
- Genus: Pingasa
- Species: P. javensis

Binomial name
- Pingasa javensis Warren, 1894

Synonyms
- Pingasa chlora lombokensis Prout, 1927

Species of moth

Pingasa javensis is a moth of the family Geometridae first described by William Warren in 1894. It is found on Java.
