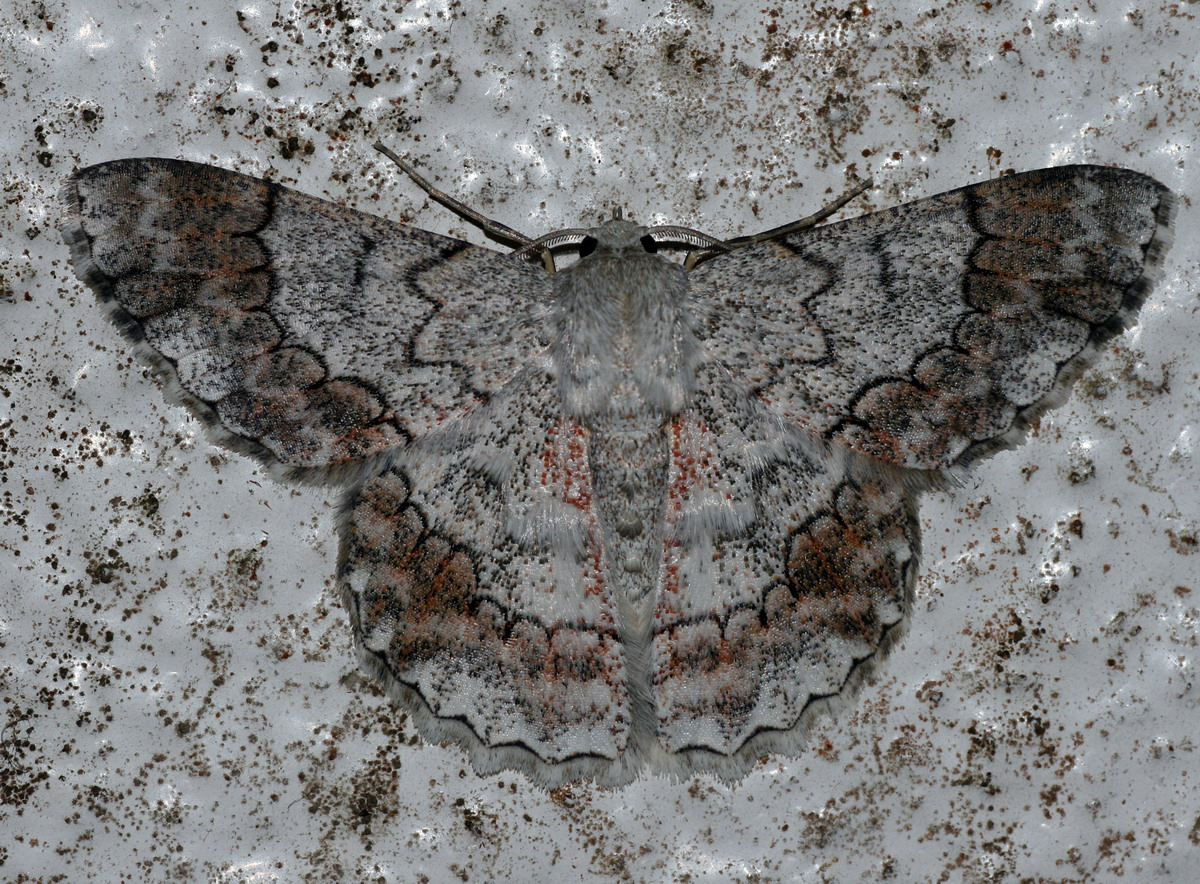
- Pingasa rubicunda

Scientific classification
- Kingdom: Animalia
- Phylum: Arthropoda
- Clade: Pancrustacea
- Class: Insecta
- Order: Lepidoptera
- Family: Geometridae
- Subfamily: Geometrinae
- Genus: Pingasa; Moore, [1887]

Synonyms
- Skorpisthes Lucas, 1900

= Pingasa =

Genus of moths

Pingasa is a genus of moths in the family Geometridae first described by Frederic Moore in 1887.

== Species ==
- Pingasa abyssiniaria (Guenée, [1858])
  - Pingasa abyssiniaria abyssiniaria (Guenée, [1858])
  - Pingasa abyssiniaria rufata D. S. Fletcher, 1956
- Pingasa aigneri Prout, 1930
  - Pingasa aigneri aigneri Prout, 1930
  - Pingasa aigneri pallida Yazaki, 1995
- Pingasa alba C. Swinhoe, 1891
  - Pingasa alba alba C. Swinhoe, 1891
  - Pingasa alba albida (Oberthür, 1913)
  - Pingasa alba brunnescens Prout, 1913
- Pingasa angulifera Warren, 1896 (=Pingasa atriscripta Warren, 1899, Hypochroma munita Lucas, 1901)
- Pingasa aravensis Prout, 1916
- Pingasa atropa Prout, 1935
- Pingasa blanda (Pagenstecher, 1900) (=Pingasa acutangula Warren, 1903)
- Pingasa chlora (Stoll, 1782)
  - Pingasa chlora chlora (Stoll, 1782) (=Hypochroma chloraria Guenée, [1858], Pseudoterpna ecchloraria Hübner, [1823], Pingasa latifascia Warren, 1894, Hypochroma paulinaria Pagenstecher, 1885)
  - Pingasa chlora candidaria Warren, 1894
  - Pingasa chlora subdentata Warren, 1894
  - Pingasa chlora sublimbata (Butler, 1882)
- Pingasa chloroides Galsworthy, 1998
- Pingasa cinerea Warren, 1894 (=Pseudoterpna singularis Kershaw, 1897, Skorpisthes undascripta Lucas, 1900)
- Pingasa cornivalva Wiltshire, 1982
- Pingasa crenaria (Guenée, [1858]) (=Hypochroma distenta Walker, 1860, Boarmia leucostigmaria Nietner, 1861)
- Pingasa decristata Warren, 1902
- Pingasa dispensata (Walker, 1860)
  - Pingasa dispensata dispensata (Walker, 1860)
  - Pingasa dispensata celata (Walker, 1866)
  - Pingasa dispensata delotypa Prout, 1935
- Pingasa distensaria (Walker, 1860)
  - Pingasa distensaria distensaria (Walker, 1860)
  - Pingasa distensaria respondens (Walker, 1860)
- Pingasa elutriata Prout, 1916
- Pingasa floridivenis Prout, 1920
- Pingasa grandidieri (Butler, 1879) (=Hypochroma eugrapharia Mabille, 1880)
- Pingasa griveaudi Herbulot, 1966
  - Pingasa griveaudi griveaudi Herbulot, 1966
  - Pingasa griveaudi vinosa Herbulot, 1985
- Pingasa herbuloti Viette, 1971
- Pingasa hypoleucaria (Guenée, 1862)
  - Pingasa hypoleucaria hypoleucaria (Guenée, 1862) (=Hypochroma borbonisaria Oberthür, 1913)
  - Pingasa hypoleucaria rhodozona de Joannis, 1932
- Pingasa hypoxantha Prout, 1916
  - Pingasa hypoxantha hypoxantha Prout, 1916
  - Pingasa hypoxantha holochroa Prout, 1916
- Pingasa javensis Warren, 1894 (=Pingasa chlora lombokensis Prout, 1927)
- Pingasa lahayei (Oberthür, 1887)
  - Pingasa lahayei lahayei (Oberthür, 1887)
  - Pingasa lahayei austrina Prout, 1917
- Pingasa lariaria (Walker, 1860) (=Hypochroma irrorataria (Moore, 1868))
- Pingasa manilensis Prout, 1916
- Pingasa meeki Warren, 1907
- Pingasa multispurcata Prout, 1913
- Pingasa murphyi Herbulot, 1994
- Pingasa nigrolineata Karisch, 2006
- Pingasa nobilis Prout, 1913
  - Pingasa nobilis nobilis Prout, 1913
  - Pingasa nobilis furvifrons Prout, 1927
- Pingasa pallidata (de Joannis, 1913)
- Pingasa pauciflavata Prout, 1927
- Pingasa porphyrochrostes Prout, 1922
- Pingasa pseudoterpnaria (Guenée, [1858])
  - Pingasa pseudoterpnaria pseudoterpnaria (Guenée, [1858]) (=Hypochroma pryeri Bulter, 1878)
  - Pingasa pseudoterpnaria gracilis Prout, 1916
  - Pingasa pseudoterpnaria tephrosiaria (Guenée, [1858])
- Pingasa rhadamaria (Guenée, [1858])
  - Pingasa rhadamaria rhadamaria (Guenée, [1858])
  - Pingasa rhadamaria alterata (Walker, 1860)
  - Pingasa rhadamaria attenuans (Walker, 1860)
  - Pingasa rhadamaria signifrontaria (Mabille, 1893)
  - Pingasa rhadamaria victoria Prout, 1913
- Pingasa rubicunda Warren, 1894
- Pingasa rubimontana Holloway & Sommerer, 1984
- Pingasa rufofasciata Moore, 1888
- Pingasa ruginaria (Guenée, [1858])
  - Pingasa ruginaria ruginaria (Guenée, [1858]) (=Hypochroma nyctemerata Walker, 1860, Hypochroma perfectaria Walker, 1860)
  - Pingasa ruginaria andamanica Prout, 1916
  - Pingasa ruginaria communicans (Walker, 1860)
  - Pingasa ruginaria commutata (Walker, 1860) (=Hypochroma batiaria Plötz, 1880)
  - Pingasa ruginaria interrupta Warren, 1901
  - Pingasa ruginaria pacifica Inoue, 1964
- Pingasa secreta Inoue, 1986
- Pingasa serrativalvis Herbulot, 2000
- Pingasa subpurpurea Warren, 1897
- Pingasa subviridis Warren, 1896
- Pingasa tapungkanana (Strand, 1910)
- Pingasa ultrata Herbulot, 1966
- Pingasa venusta Warren, 1894
