= Pingasa manilensis =

Scientific classification
- Kingdom: Animalia
- Phylum: Arthropoda
- Clade: Pancrustacea
- Class: Insecta
- Order: Lepidoptera
- Family: Geometridae
- Genus: Pingasa
- Species: P. manilensis

Binomial name
- Pingasa manilensis L. B. Prout, 1916

Species of moth

Pingasa manilensis is a moth of the family Geometridae first described by Louis Beethoven Prout in 1916. It is found on the Philippines.
