= Pingasa venusta =

Scientific classification
- Kingdom: Animalia
- Phylum: Arthropoda
- Clade: Pancrustacea
- Class: Insecta
- Order: Lepidoptera
- Family: Geometridae
- Genus: Pingasa
- Species: P. venusta

Binomial name
- Pingasa venusta Warren, 1894

Species of moth

Pingasa venusta is a moth of the family Geometridae first described by William Warren in 1894. It is found in the north-eastern Himalayas, Sundaland and on Sulawesi, Seram and on New Guinea. The habitat consists of lowland areas up to 1,930 meters, including disturbed vegetation and secondary forests.
