= Pingasa ultrata =

Scientific classification
- Kingdom: Animalia
- Phylum: Arthropoda
- Clade: Pancrustacea
- Class: Insecta
- Order: Lepidoptera
- Family: Geometridae
- Genus: Pingasa
- Species: P. ultrata

Binomial name
- Pingasa ultrata Herbulot, 1966

Species of moth

Pingasa ultrata is a moth of the family Geometridae first described by Claude Herbulot in 1966. It is found on the Comoros in the Indian Ocean.
