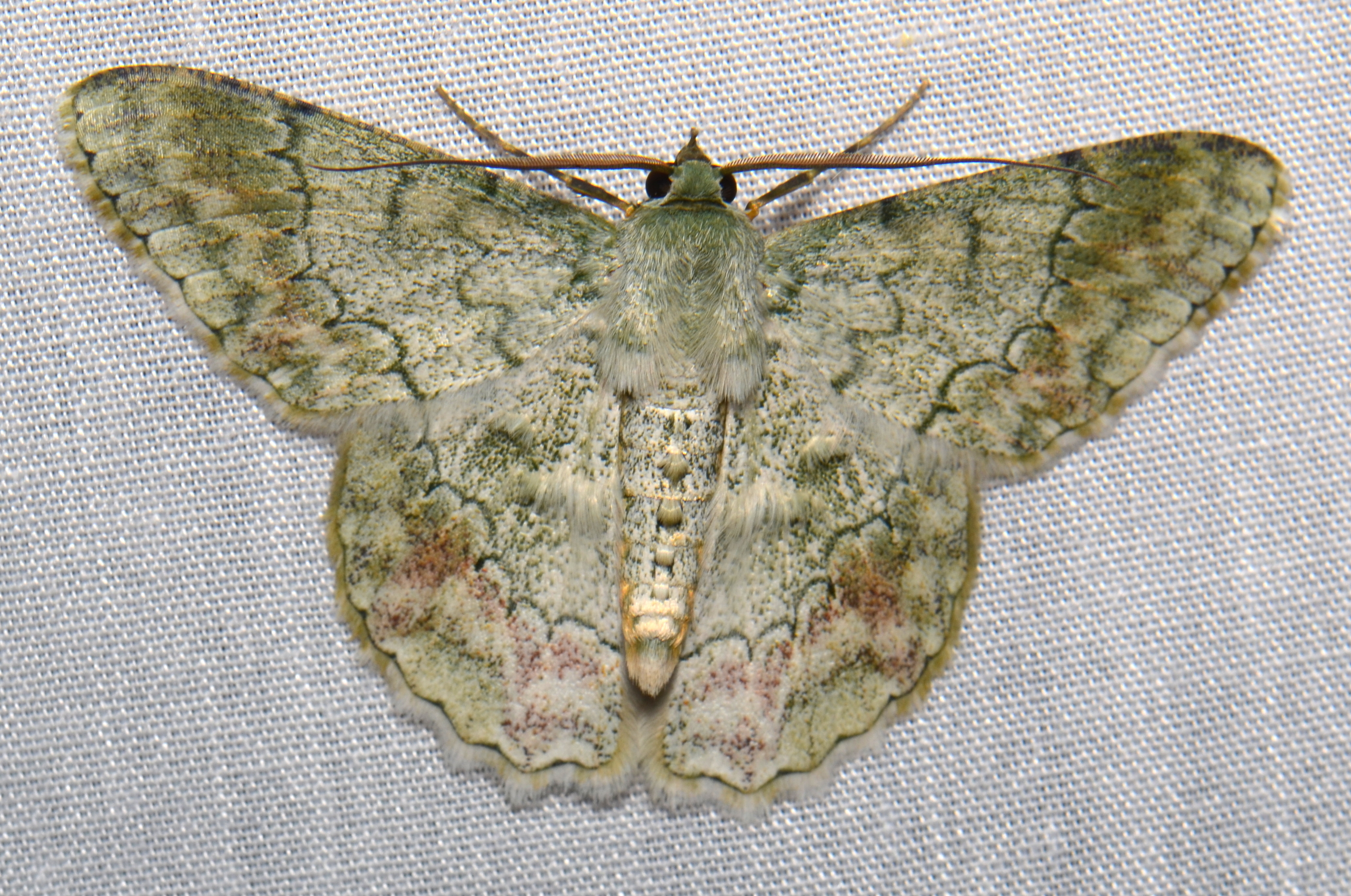

Scientific classification
- Kingdom: Animalia
- Phylum: Arthropoda
- Clade: Pancrustacea
- Class: Insecta
- Order: Lepidoptera
- Family: Geometridae
- Genus: Pingasa
- Species: P. subpurpurea

Binomial name
- Pingasa subpurpurea Warren, 1897

= Pingasa subpurpurea =

Species of moth

Pingasa subpurpurea is a moth of the family Geometridae first described by William Warren in 1897. It is found on Borneo, the Philippines and Sulawesi.
