= Pingasa crenaria =

Scientific classification
- Kingdom: Animalia
- Phylum: Arthropoda
- Clade: Pancrustacea
- Class: Insecta
- Order: Lepidoptera
- Family: Geometridae
- Genus: Pingasa
- Species: P. crenaria

Binomial name
- Pingasa crenaria (Guenée, [1858])

Synonyms
- Hypochroma crenaria Guenée, [1858]; Hypochroma distenta Walker, 1860; Boarmia leucostigmaria Nietner, 1861

Species of moth

Pingasa crenaria is a moth of the family Geometridae first described by Achille Guenée in 1858. It is found in India and Taiwan.
