= Pingasa pauciflavata =

Scientific classification
- Kingdom: Animalia
- Phylum: Arthropoda
- Clade: Pancrustacea
- Class: Insecta
- Order: Lepidoptera
- Family: Geometridae
- Genus: Pingasa
- Species: P. pauciflavata

Binomial name
- Pingasa pauciflavata L. B. Prout, 1927

Species of moth

Pingasa pauciflavata is a moth of the family Geometridae first described by Louis Beethoven Prout in 1927. It is found on Sumatra in Indonesia.
