= Pingasa porphyrochrostes =

Scientific classification
- Kingdom: Animalia
- Phylum: Arthropoda
- Clade: Pancrustacea
- Class: Insecta
- Order: Lepidoptera
- Family: Geometridae
- Genus: Pingasa
- Species: P. porphyrochrostes

Binomial name
- Pingasa porphyrochrostes L. B. Prout, 1922

Species of moth

Pingasa porphyrochrostes is a moth of the family Geometridae first described by Louis Beethoven Prout in 1922.

== Distribution ==
It is found on Seram in Indonesia.
