= Pingasa elutriata =

Scientific classification
- Kingdom: Animalia
- Phylum: Arthropoda
- Clade: Pancrustacea
- Class: Insecta
- Order: Lepidoptera
- Family: Geometridae
- Genus: Pingasa
- Species: P. elutriata

Binomial name
- Pingasa elutriata L. B. Prout, 1916

Species of moth

Pingasa elutriata is a moth of the family Geometridae first described by Louis Beethoven Prout in 1916. It is found in northern India.
