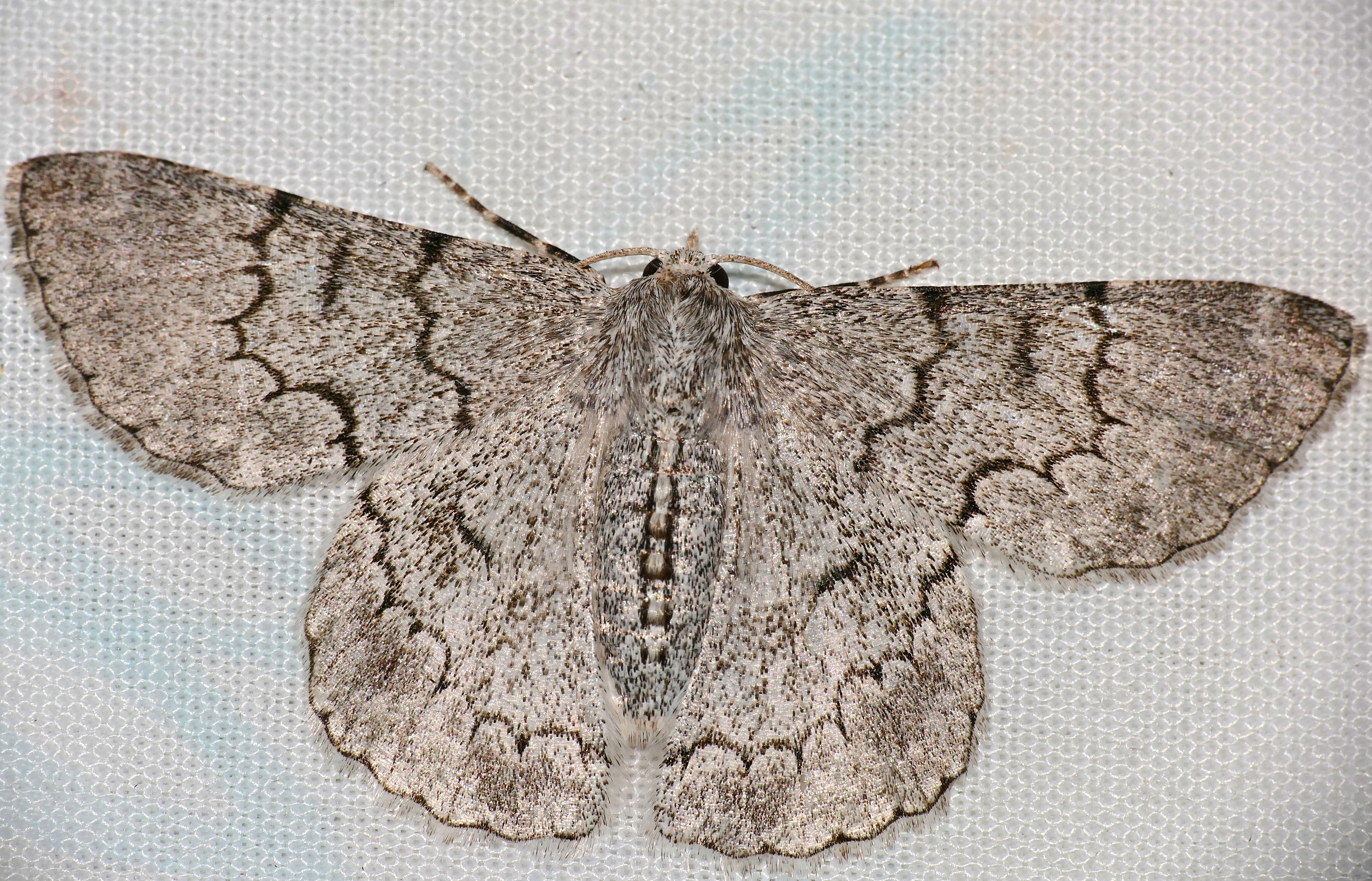

Scientific classification
- Kingdom: Animalia
- Phylum: Arthropoda
- Clade: Pancrustacea
- Class: Insecta
- Order: Lepidoptera
- Family: Geometridae
- Genus: Pingasa
- Species: P. rhadamaria

Binomial name
- Pingasa rhadamaria (Guenée, [1858])

Synonyms
- Hypochroma rhadamaria Guenée, [1858]; Hypochroma alterata Walker, 1860; Hypochroma attenuans Walker, 1860; Hypochroma signifrontaria Mabille, 1893

= Pingasa rhadamaria =

Species of moth

Pingasa rhadamaria is a moth of the family Geometridae first described by Achille Guenée in 1858. It is found on the Comoros, Madagascar and São Tomé and Príncipe and in Sierra Leone, South Africa, the Gambia, Zimbabwe, Cameroon, Ghana, Ethiopia, Kenya, Tanzania and Zambia.

The larvae feed on Ziziphus jujuba and Ziziphus mauritiana.

== Subspecies ==
- Pingasa rhadamaria rhadamaria (Madagascar)
- Pingasa rhadamaria alterata (Walker, 1860) (Kenya, South Africa)
- Pingasa rhadamaria attenuans (Walker, 1860) (Sierra Leone, São Tomé, Gambia)
- Pingasa rhadamaria signifrontaria (Mabille, 1893) (the Comoros)
- Pingasa rhadamaria victoria Prout, 1913 (Zimbabwe)
