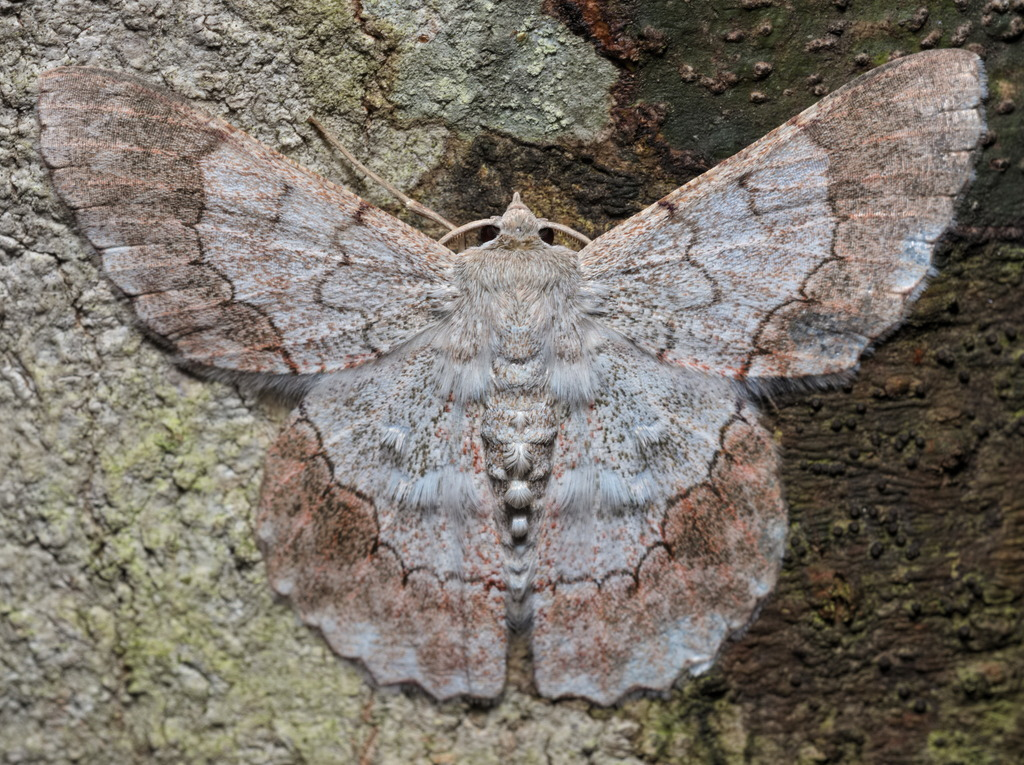

Scientific classification
- Kingdom: Animalia
- Phylum: Arthropoda
- Clade: Pancrustacea
- Class: Insecta
- Order: Lepidoptera
- Family: Geometridae
- Genus: Pingasa
- Species: P. rubimontana

Binomial name
- Pingasa rubimontana Holloway & Sommerer, 1984

= Pingasa rubimontana =

Species of moth

Pingasa rubimontana is a moth of the family Geometridae first described by Jeremy Daniel Holloway and Manfred D. Sommerer in 1984. It is found on Sumatra, Borneo and Sulawesi. The habitat consists of upper montane forest, where it is found at elevations between 1,200 and 1,790 meters.
