= Pingasa distensaria =

Scientific classification
- Kingdom: Animalia
- Phylum: Arthropoda
- Clade: Pancrustacea
- Class: Insecta
- Order: Lepidoptera
- Family: Geometridae
- Genus: Pingasa
- Species: P. distensaria

Binomial name
- Pingasa distensaria (Walker, 1860)

Synonyms
- Hypochroma distensaria Walker, 1860; Hypochroma respondens Walker, 1860

Species of moth

Pingasa distensaria is a moth of the family Geometridae first described by Francis Walker in 1860. It is found in Africa.

== Subspecies ==
- Pingasa distensaria distensaria (Walker, 1860) (Burundi, Cameroon, Kenya, Rwanda, South Africa, Tanzania, Uganda, Zimbabwe)
- Pingasa distensaria respondens (Walker, 1860) (South Africa)
