= Pingasa griveaudi =

Scientific classification
- Kingdom: Animalia
- Phylum: Arthropoda
- Clade: Pancrustacea
- Class: Insecta
- Order: Lepidoptera
- Family: Geometridae
- Genus: Pingasa
- Species: P. griveaudi

Binomial name
- Pingasa griveaudi Herbulot, 1966

Species of moth

Pingasa griveaudi is a moth of the family Geometridae first described by Claude Herbulot in 1966. It is found on the Comoros.

== Subspecies ==
- Pingasa griveaudi griveaudi (Anjouan, Mayotte)
- Pingasa griveaudi vinosa Herbulot, 1985 (Grande Comore)
