= Pingasa atropa =

Scientific classification
- Kingdom: Animalia
- Phylum: Arthropoda
- Clade: Pancrustacea
- Class: Insecta
- Order: Lepidoptera
- Family: Geometridae
- Genus: Pingasa
- Species: P. atropa

Binomial name
- Pingasa atropa L. B. Prout, 1935

Species of moth

Pingasa atropa is a moth of the family Geometridae first described by Louis Beethoven Prout in 1935. It is found on Java.
