= Pingasa hypoxantha =

Scientific classification
- Kingdom: Animalia
- Phylum: Arthropoda
- Clade: Pancrustacea
- Class: Insecta
- Order: Lepidoptera
- Family: Geometridae
- Genus: Pingasa
- Species: P. hypoxantha

Binomial name
- Pingasa hypoxantha L. B. Prout, 1916

Species of moth

Pingasa hypoxantha is a moth of the family Geometridae first described by Louis Beethoven Prout in 1916. It is found in the Democratic Republic of the Congo and Kenya.

== Subspecies ==
- Pingasa hypoxantha hypoxantha (Kenya)
- Pingasa hypoxantha holochroa Prout, 1916 (Democratic Republic of the Congo)
