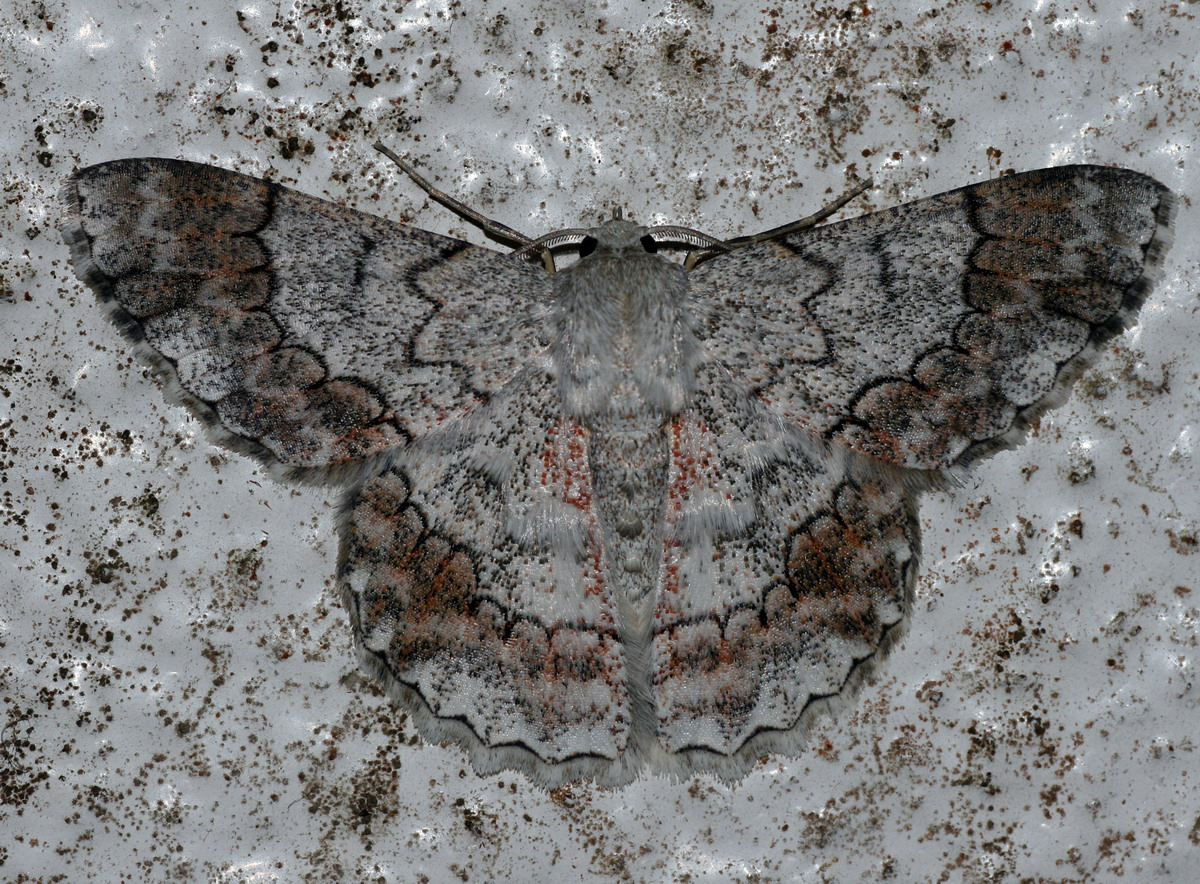

Scientific classification
- Kingdom: Animalia
- Phylum: Arthropoda
- Clade: Pancrustacea
- Class: Insecta
- Order: Lepidoptera
- Family: Geometridae
- Genus: Pingasa
- Species: P. rubicunda

Binomial name
- Pingasa rubicunda Warren, 1894

= Pingasa rubicunda =

Species of moth

Pingasa rubicunda is a species of moth of the family Geometridae first described by William Warren in 1894. It is found in northern India, Sundaland and the Philippines.

The larvae have been recorded feeding on the flowers of Shorea species.
