= Pingasa subviridis =

Scientific classification
- Kingdom: Animalia
- Phylum: Arthropoda
- Clade: Pancrustacea
- Class: Insecta
- Order: Lepidoptera
- Family: Geometridae
- Genus: Pingasa
- Species: P. subviridis

Binomial name
- Pingasa subviridis Warren, 1896

Species of moth

Pingasa subviridis is a moth of the family Geometridae first described by William Warren in 1896. It is found in India on Peninsular Malaysia, Sumatra, Java and Borneo. The habitat consists of forested lowland areas up to 1,930 meters.
