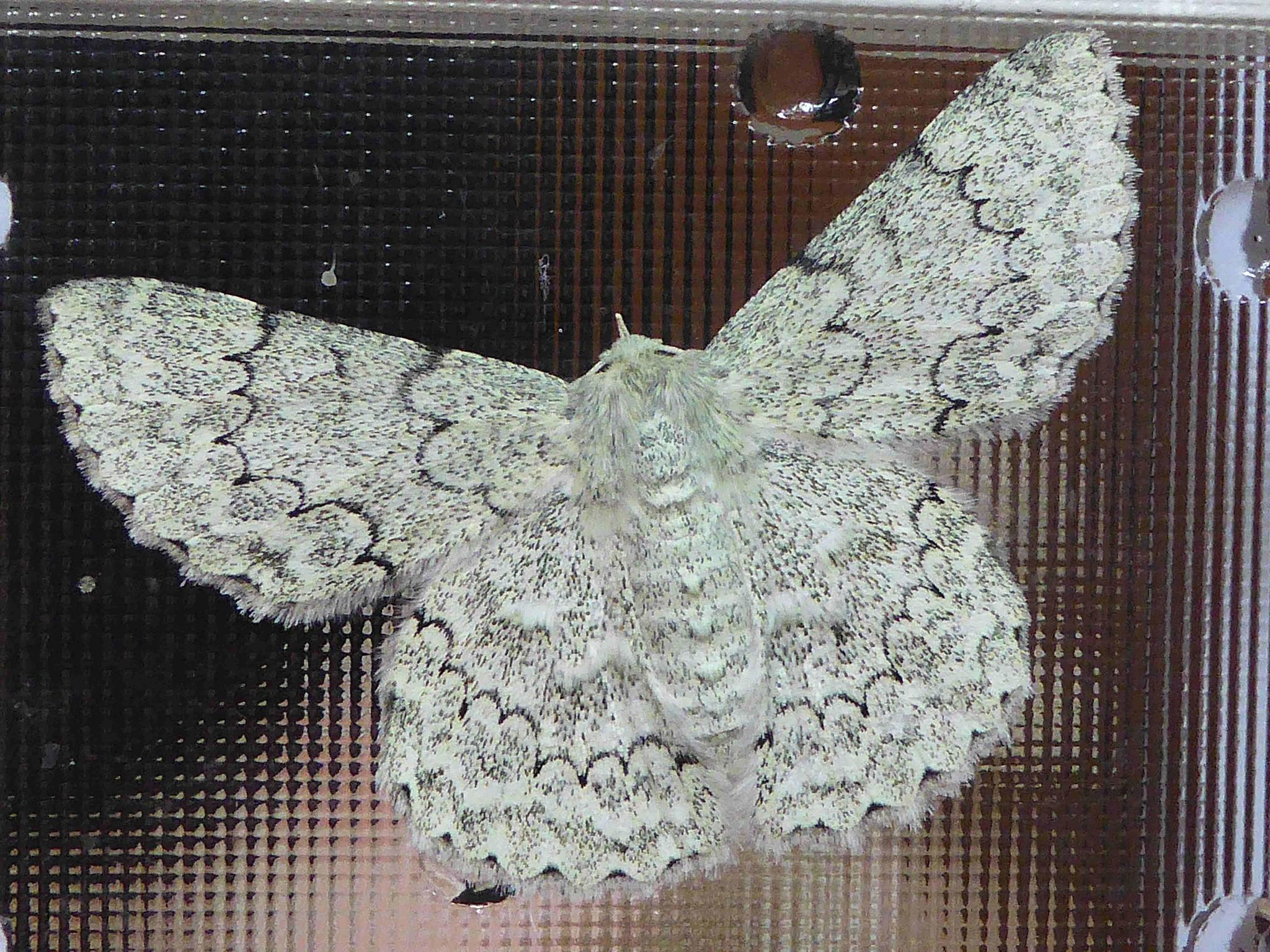

Scientific classification
- Kingdom: Animalia
- Phylum: Arthropoda
- Clade: Pancrustacea
- Class: Insecta
- Order: Lepidoptera
- Family: Geometridae
- Genus: Pingasa
- Species: P. abyssiniaria

Binomial name
- Pingasa abyssiniaria (Guenée, [1858])

Synonyms
- Hypochroma abyssiniaria Guenée, [1858]

= Pingasa abyssiniaria =

Species of moth

Pingasa abyssiniaria is a moth of the family Geometridae first described by Achille Guenée in 1858. It is found in Ethiopia and South Africa.

== Subspecies ==
- Pingasa abyssiniaria abyssiniaria
- Pingasa abyssiniaria rufata D. S. Fletcher, 1956
