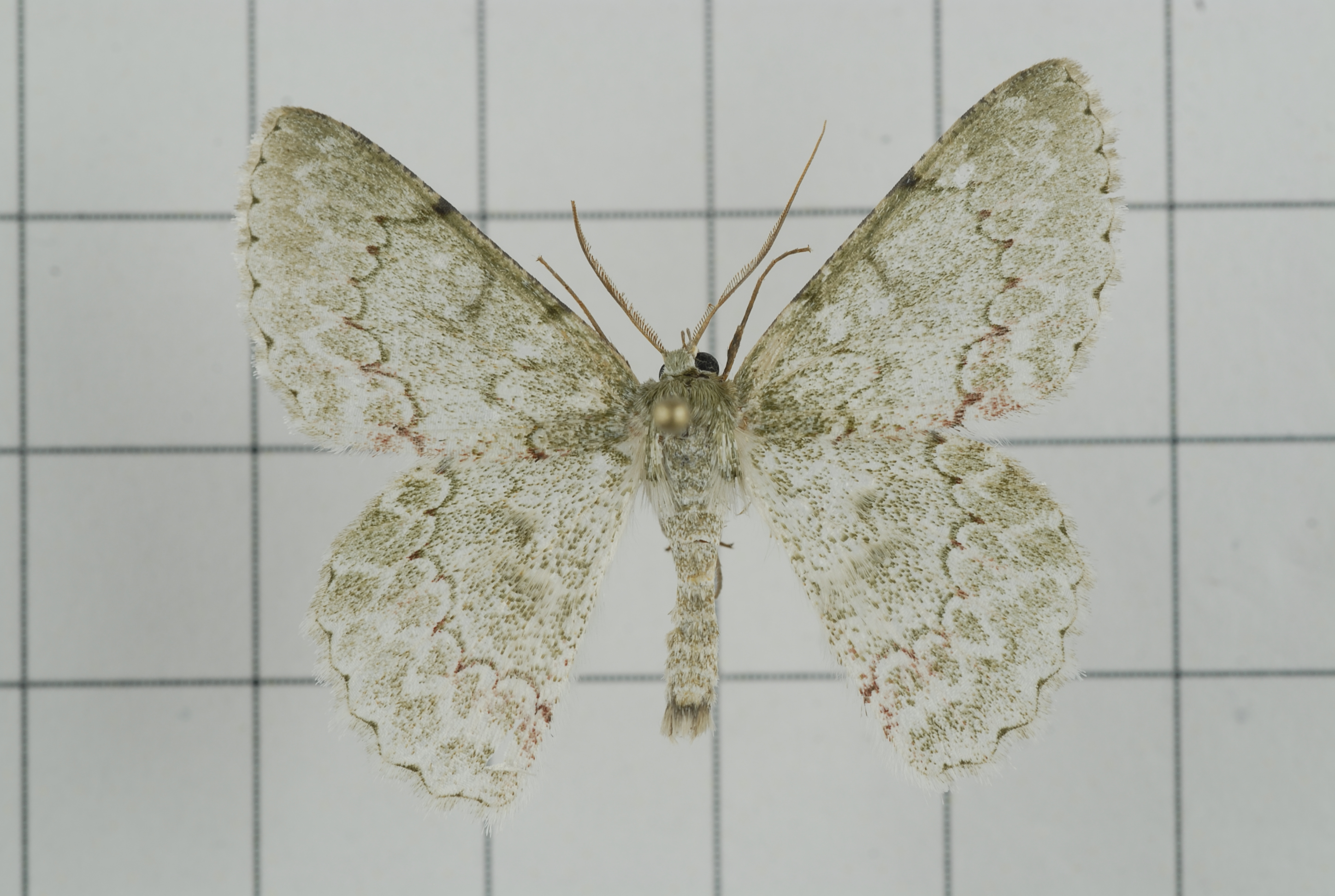

Scientific classification
- Kingdom: Animalia
- Phylum: Arthropoda
- Clade: Pancrustacea
- Class: Insecta
- Order: Lepidoptera
- Family: Geometridae
- Genus: Pingasa
- Species: P. secreta

Binomial name
- Pingasa secreta Inoue, 1986

= Pingasa secreta =

Species of moth

Pingasa secreta is a moth of the family Geometridae first described by Hiroshi Inoue in 1986. It is found in Taiwan.
