= Pingasa cornivalva =

Scientific classification
- Kingdom: Animalia
- Phylum: Arthropoda
- Clade: Pancrustacea
- Class: Insecta
- Order: Lepidoptera
- Family: Geometridae
- Genus: Pingasa
- Species: P. cornivalva

Binomial name
- Pingasa cornivalva Wiltshire, 1982

Species of moth

Pingasa cornivalva is a moth of the family Geometridae first described by Wiltshire in 1982. It is found in Saudi Arabia.
