= Pingasa dispensata =

Scientific classification
- Kingdom: Animalia
- Phylum: Arthropoda
- Clade: Pancrustacea
- Class: Insecta
- Order: Lepidoptera
- Family: Geometridae
- Genus: Pingasa
- Species: P. dispensata

Binomial name
- Pingasa dispensata (Walker, 1860)

Synonyms
- Hypochroma dispensata Walker, 1860; Hypochroma celata Walker, 1866

Species of moth

Pingasa dispensata is a moth of the family Geometridae first described by Francis Walker in 1860. It is found in India, Sulawesi and possibly Africa.

The larvae have been recorded feeding on the leaves of Ziziphus jujuba.

== Subspecies ==
- Pingasa dispensata dispensata (India)
- Pingasa dispensata celata (Walker, 1866) (Sulawesi) (erroneous locality? originally as "Tond")
- Pingasa dispensata delotypa Prout, 1935 (Bioko) (See Protonym Pingasa abyssiniaria delotypa Prout, 1935:120 from "Fernando-Po", possibly confused later with African Pingasa distensaria [?!?]).
