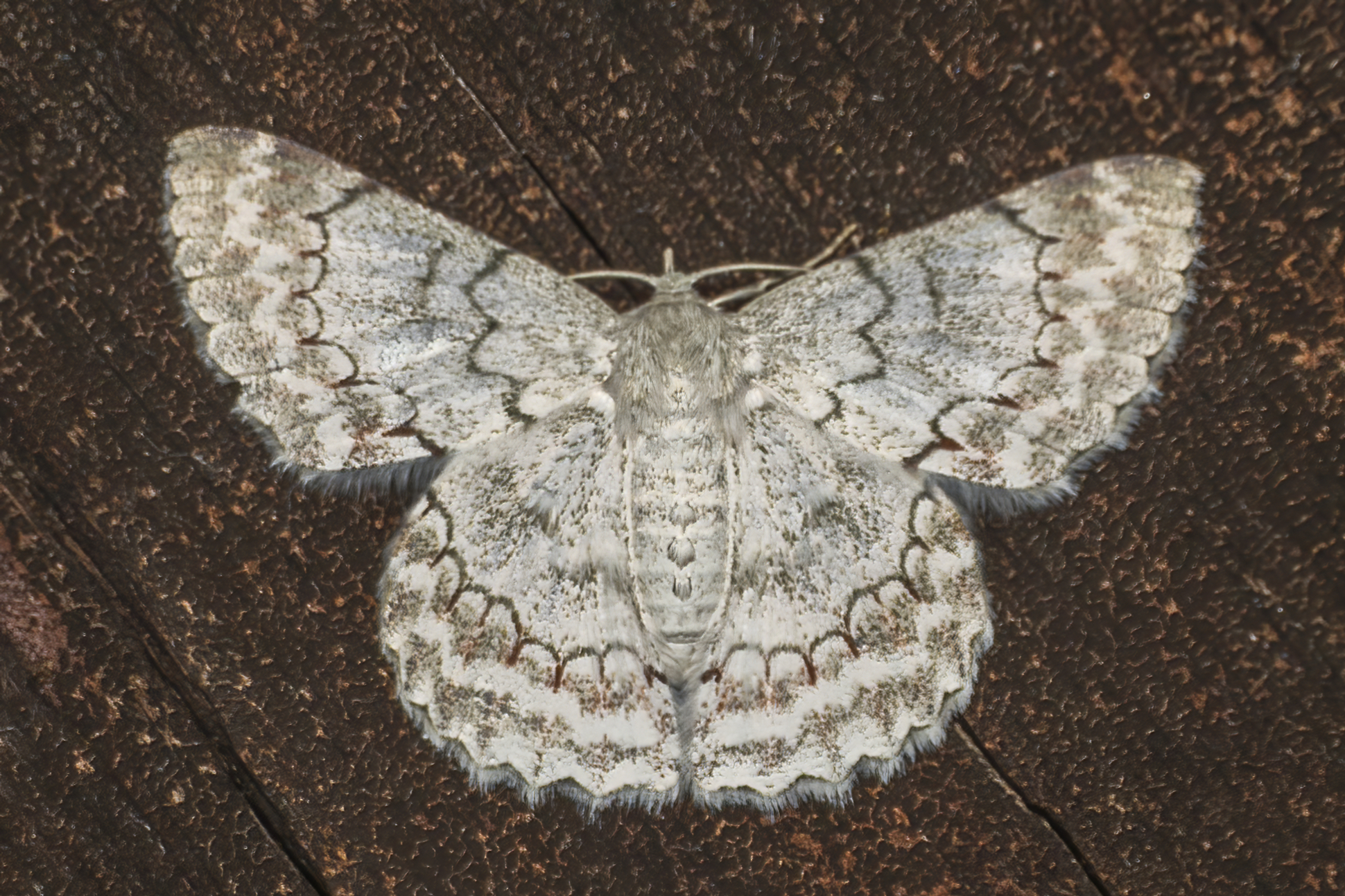
- male, Sri Lanka

Scientific classification
- Kingdom: Animalia
- Phylum: Arthropoda
- Clade: Pancrustacea
- Class: Insecta
- Order: Lepidoptera
- Family: Geometridae
- Genus: Pingasa
- Species: P. rufofasciata

Binomial name
- Pingasa rufofasciata Moore, 1888

= Pingasa rufofasciata =

Species of moth

Pingasa rufofasciata is a moth of the family Geometridae first described by Frederic Moore in 1888. It is found in China (Hubei, Hunan, Guangxi, Zhejiang, Yunnan, Fujian, Guizhou, Jiangxi, Sichuan).
