= Pingasa floridivenis =

Scientific classification
- Kingdom: Animalia
- Phylum: Arthropoda
- Clade: Pancrustacea
- Class: Insecta
- Order: Lepidoptera
- Family: Geometridae
- Genus: Pingasa
- Species: P. floridivenis

Binomial name
- Pingasa floridivenis L. B. Prout, 1920

Species of moth

Pingasa floridivenis is a moth of the family Geometridae first described by Louis Beethoven Prout in 1920. It is found in Ghana.
