= Pingasa decristata =

Scientific classification
- Kingdom: Animalia
- Phylum: Arthropoda
- Clade: Pancrustacea
- Class: Insecta
- Order: Lepidoptera
- Family: Geometridae
- Genus: Pingasa
- Species: P. decristata

Binomial name
- Pingasa decristata Warren, 1902

Species of moth

Pingasa decristata is a moth of the family Geometridae first described by William Warren in 1902. It occurs on São Tomé Island.
