= Euroschinus aoupiniensis =

Conservation status
- Vulnerable (IUCN 2.3)

Scientific classification
- Kingdom: Plantae
- Clade: Tracheophytes
- Clade: Angiosperms
- Clade: Eudicots
- Clade: Rosids
- Order: Sapindales
- Family: Anacardiaceae
- Genus: Euroschinus
- Species: E. aoupiniensis

Binomial name
- Euroschinus aoupiniensis Hoff

Species of flowering plant

Euroschinus aoupiniensis is a species of plant in the family Anacardiaceae. It is endemic to New Caledonia.
