= Pingasa pseudoterpnaria =

Scientific classification
- Kingdom: Animalia
- Phylum: Arthropoda
- Clade: Pancrustacea
- Class: Insecta
- Order: Lepidoptera
- Family: Geometridae
- Genus: Pingasa
- Species: P. pseudoterpnaria

Binomial name
- Pingasa pseudoterpnaria (Guenée, [1858])

Synonyms
- Hypochroma pseudoterpnaria Guenée, [1858]; Hypochroma pryeri Bulter, 1878; Hypochroma tephrosiaria Guenée, [1858]

Species of moth

Pingasa pseudoterpnaria is a moth of the family Geometridae first described by Achille Guenée in 1858. It is found in China (Hubei, Hunan, Anhui, Shandong, Zhejiang, Fujian, Beijing, Jiangxi, Jiangsu, Sichuan), Japan and India.

The wingspan is 32–35 mm.

== Subspecies ==
- Pingasa pseudoterpnaria pseudoterpnaria (Japan, China)
- Pingasa pseudoterpnaria gracilis Prout, 1916 (India)
- Pingasa pseudoterpnaria tephrosiaria (Guenée, [1858]) (India)
