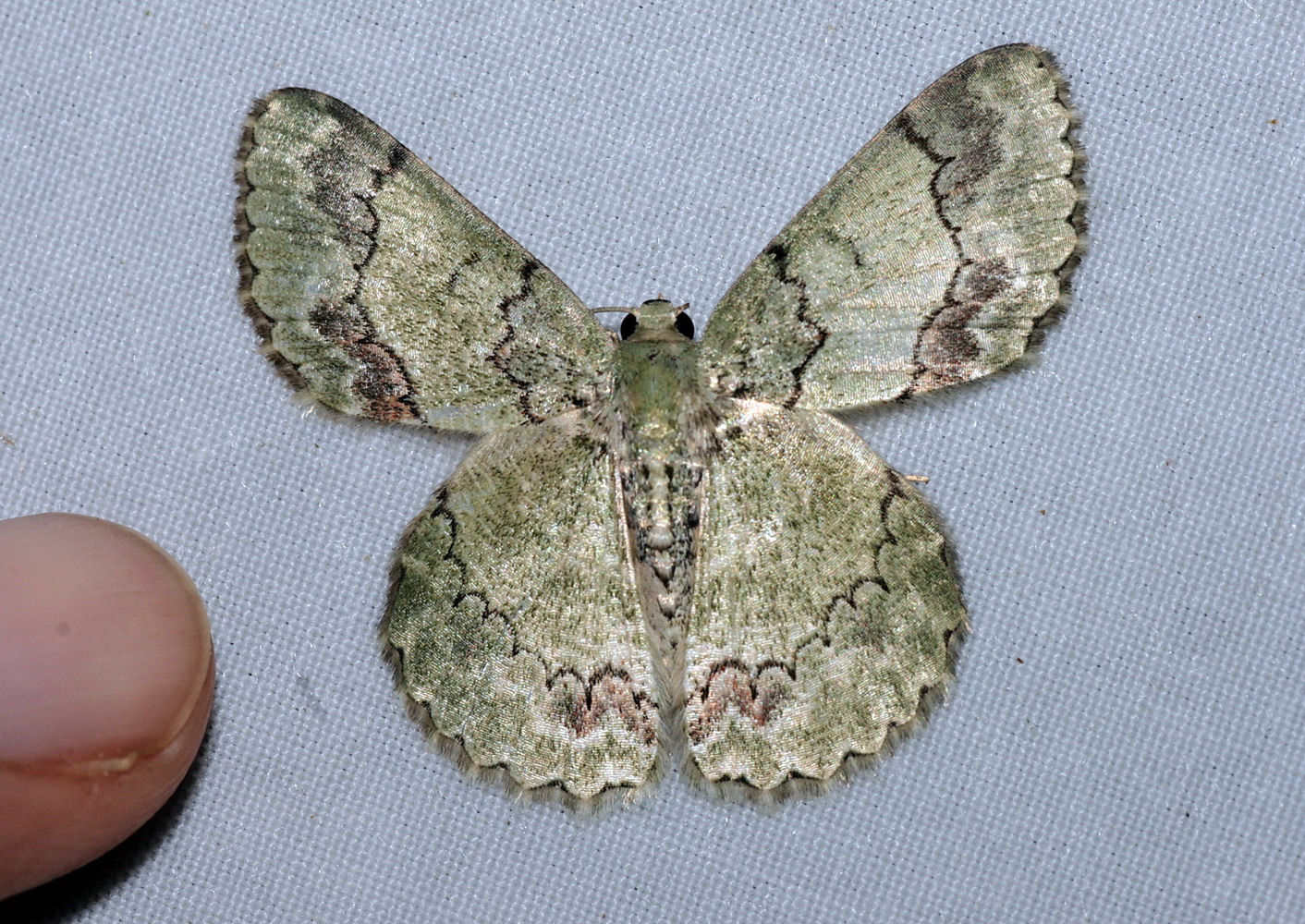

Scientific classification
- Kingdom: Animalia
- Phylum: Arthropoda
- Clade: Pancrustacea
- Class: Insecta
- Order: Lepidoptera
- Family: Geometridae
- Genus: Pingasa
- Species: P. tapungkanana

Binomial name
- Pingasa tapungkanana (Strand, 1910)

Synonyms
- Pseudoterpna tapungkanana Strand, 1910

= Pingasa tapungkanana =

Species of moth

Pingasa tapungkanana is a moth of the family Geometridae first described by Embrik Strand in 1910. It is found on Sumatra.
