= Pingasa chloroides =

Scientific classification
- Kingdom: Animalia
- Phylum: Arthropoda
- Clade: Pancrustacea
- Class: Insecta
- Order: Lepidoptera
- Family: Geometridae
- Genus: Pingasa
- Species: P. chloroides

Binomial name
- Pingasa chloroides Galsworthy, 1998

Species of moth

Pingasa chloroides is a moth of the family Geometridae first described by Anthony Galsworthy in 1998. It is found in China (Hong Kong, Fujian, Guangdong).
