= Pingasa murphyi =

Scientific classification
- Kingdom: Animalia
- Phylum: Arthropoda
- Clade: Pancrustacea
- Class: Insecta
- Order: Lepidoptera
- Family: Geometridae
- Genus: Pingasa
- Species: P. murphyi

Binomial name
- Pingasa murphyi Herbulot, 1994

Species of moth

Pingasa murphyi is a moth of the family Geometridae first described by Claude Herbulot in 1994. It is found in Africa.
