= Pingasa nigrolineata =

Scientific classification
- Kingdom: Animalia
- Phylum: Arthropoda
- Clade: Pancrustacea
- Class: Insecta
- Order: Lepidoptera
- Family: Geometridae
- Genus: Pingasa
- Species: P. nigrolineata

Binomial name
- Pingasa nigrolineata Karisch, 2006

Species of moth

Pingasa nigrolineata is a moth of the family Geometridae which is endemic to Cameroon. The species was first described by Timm Karisch in 2006.
