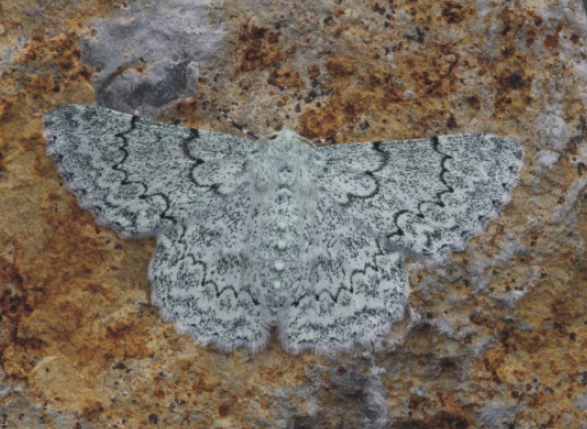

Scientific classification
- Kingdom: Animalia
- Phylum: Arthropoda
- Clade: Pancrustacea
- Class: Insecta
- Order: Lepidoptera
- Family: Geometridae
- Genus: Pingasa
- Species: P. pallidata

Binomial name
- Pingasa pallidata (de Joannis, 1913)

Synonyms
- Hypochroma pallidata de Joannis, 1913

= Pingasa pallidata =

Species of moth

Pingasa pallidata is a moth of the family Geometridae first described by Joseph de Joannis in 1913. It is found in Eritrea.
