= Pingasa grandidieri =

Scientific classification
- Kingdom: Animalia
- Phylum: Arthropoda
- Clade: Pancrustacea
- Class: Insecta
- Order: Lepidoptera
- Family: Geometridae
- Genus: Pingasa
- Species: P. grandidieri

Binomial name
- Pingasa grandidieri (Butler, 1879)

Synonyms
- Hypochroma grandidieri Butler, 1879; Hypochroma eugrapharia Mabille, 1880

Species of moth

Pingasa grandidieri is a moth of the family Geometridae first described by Arthur Gardiner Butler in 1879. It is found on Madagascar.
