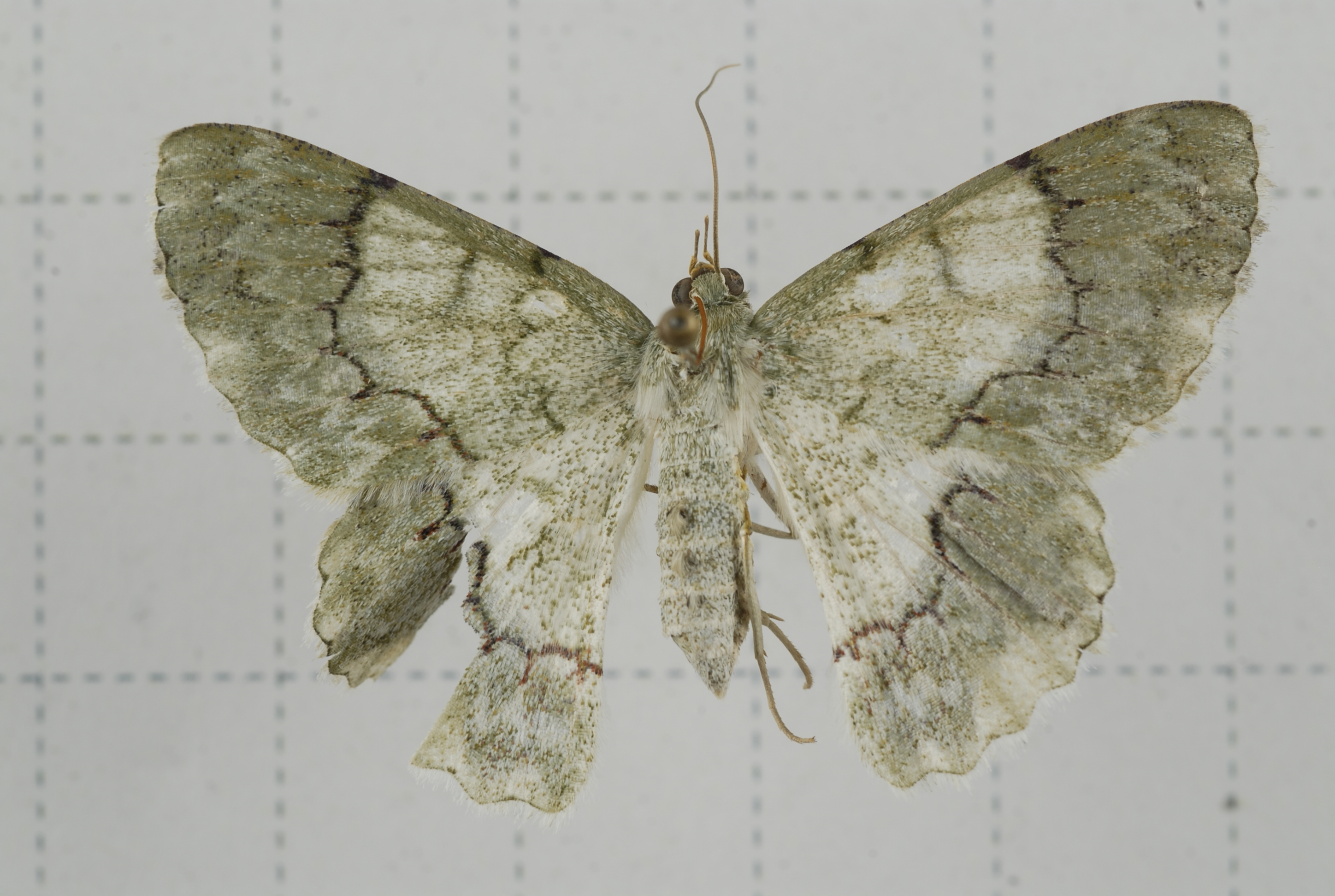

Scientific classification
- Kingdom: Animalia
- Phylum: Arthropoda
- Clade: Pancrustacea
- Class: Insecta
- Order: Lepidoptera
- Family: Geometridae
- Genus: Pingasa
- Species: P. alba

Binomial name
- Pingasa alba C. Swinhoe, 1891

Synonyms
- Hypochroma albida Oberthür, 1913

= Pingasa alba =

Species of moth

Pingasa alba is a moth of the family Geometridae first described by Charles Swinhoe in 1891. It is found in the Chinese provinces of Hubei, Hunan, Guangxi, Zhejiang, Yunnan, Fujian, Guizhou, Jiangxi and Sichuan, and in Taiwan and Japan.

== Subspecies ==
- Pingasa alba alba
- Pingasa alba albida (Oberthür, 1913) (China: Yunnan, Sichuan)
- Pingasa alba brunnescens L. B. Prout, 1913 (Japan, China: Hubei, Hunan, Guangxi, Zhejiang, Fujian, Guizhou, Jiangxi, Sichuan)
- Pingasa alba yunnana Chu, 1981 (China: Yunnan)
