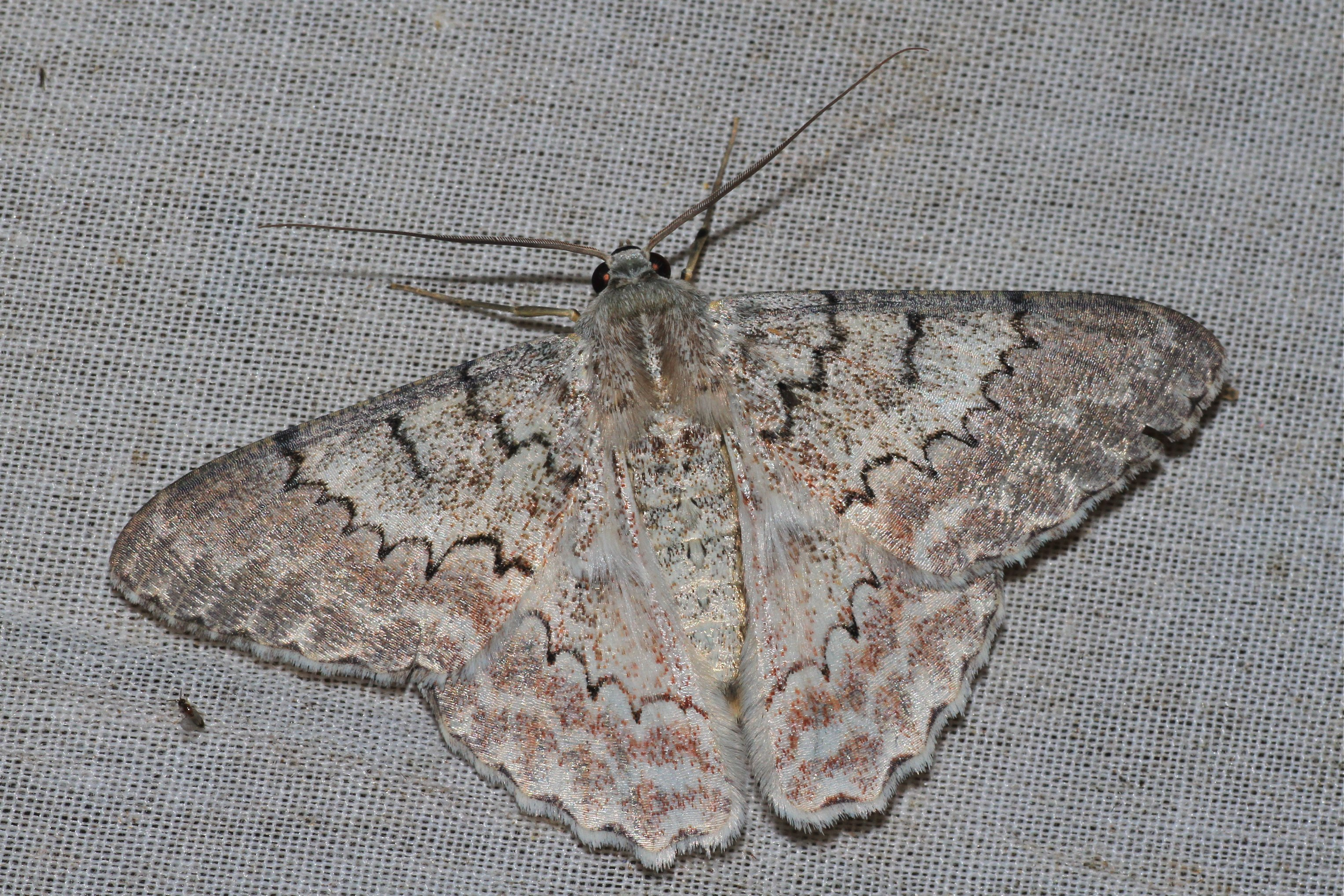

Scientific classification
- Kingdom: Animalia
- Phylum: Arthropoda
- Clade: Pancrustacea
- Class: Insecta
- Order: Lepidoptera
- Family: Geometridae
- Genus: Pingasa
- Species: P. lariaria

Binomial name
- Pingasa lariaria (Walker, 1860)

Synonyms
- Hypochroma lariaria Walker, 1860; Hypochroma irrorataria Moore, 1868

= Pingasa lariaria =

Species of moth

Pingasa lariaria is a moth of the family Geometridae first described by Francis Walker in 1860. It is found in Yunnan, China.
