= Pingasa cinerea =

Scientific classification
- Kingdom: Animalia
- Phylum: Arthropoda
- Clade: Pancrustacea
- Class: Insecta
- Order: Lepidoptera
- Family: Geometridae
- Genus: Pingasa
- Species: P. cinerea

Binomial name
- Pingasa cinerea Warren, 1894

Synonyms
- Pseudoterpna singularis Kershaw, 1897; Skorpisthes undascripta Lucas, 1900

Species of moth

Pingasa cinerea, the tan-spotted grey, is a moth of the family Geometridae. The species was first described by William Warren in 1894. It is found in the Australian states of New South Wales, Queensland, Tasmania and Victoria.

The wingspan is about 30 mm.
