= Pingasa aigneri =

Scientific classification
- Kingdom: Animalia
- Phylum: Arthropoda
- Clade: Pancrustacea
- Class: Insecta
- Order: Lepidoptera
- Family: Geometridae
- Genus: Pingasa
- Species: P. aigneri

Binomial name
- Pingasa aigneri L. B. Prout, 1930

Species of moth

Pingasa aigneri is a moth of the family Geometridae first described by Louis Beethoven Prout in 1930. It is found in Japan.

The wingspan is 37–38 mm.

== Subspecies ==
- Pingasa aigneri aigneri
- Pingasa aigneri pallida Yazaki, 1995
