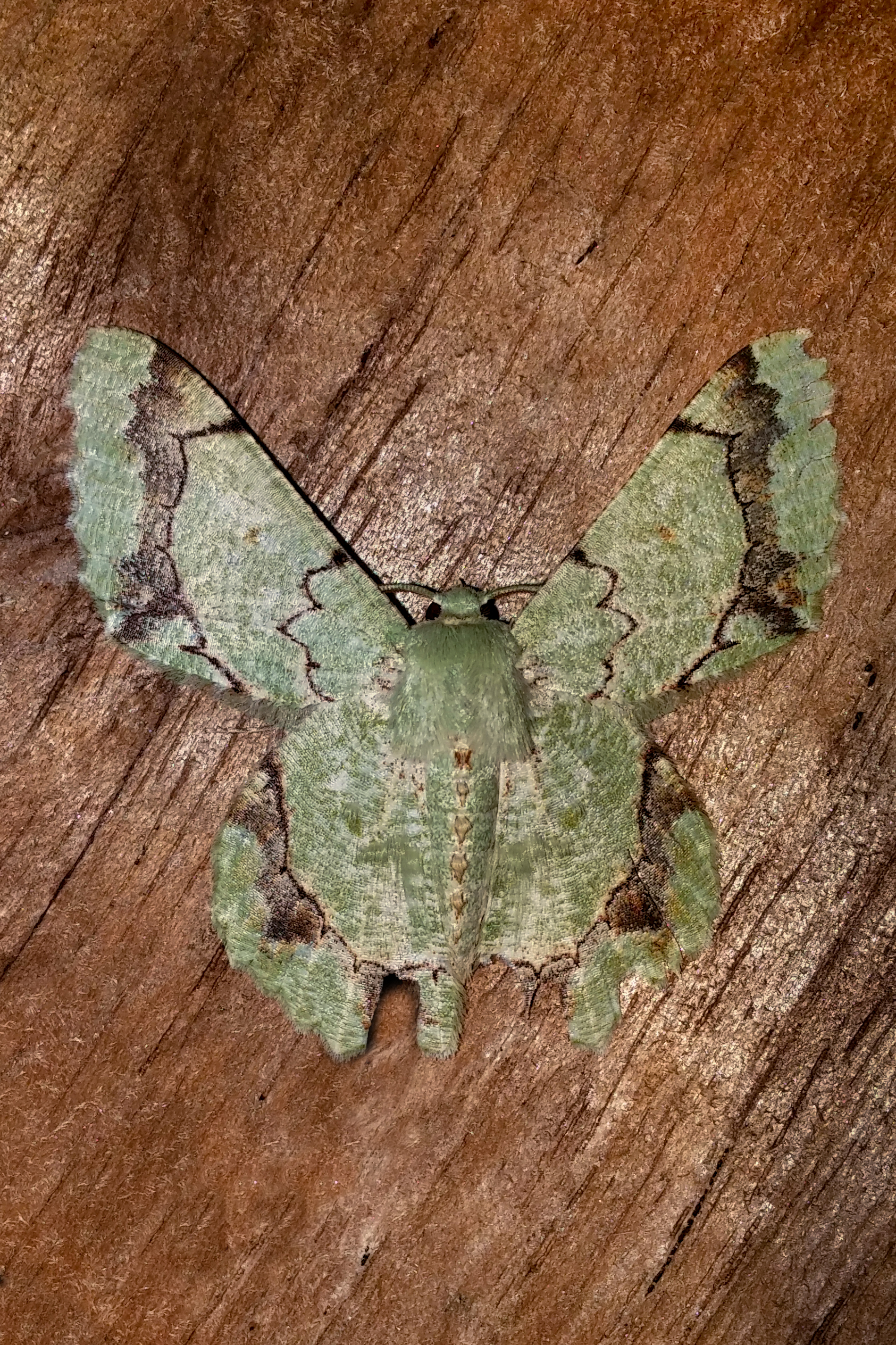

Scientific classification
- Kingdom: Animalia
- Phylum: Arthropoda
- Clade: Pancrustacea
- Class: Insecta
- Order: Lepidoptera
- Family: Geometridae
- Genus: Pingasa
- Species: P. meeki

Binomial name
- Pingasa meeki Warren, 1907

= Pingasa meeki =

Species of moth

Pingasa meeki is a moth of the family Geometridae first described by William Warren in 1907. It is found on New Guinea.
