= Pingasa nobilis =

Scientific classification
- Kingdom: Animalia
- Phylum: Arthropoda
- Clade: Pancrustacea
- Class: Insecta
- Order: Lepidoptera
- Family: Geometridae
- Genus: Pingasa
- Species: P. nobilis

Binomial name
- Pingasa nobilis L. B. Prout, 1913

Species of moth

Pingasa nobilis is a moth of the family Geometridae first described by Louis Beethoven Prout in 1913. It is found in New Guinea and Queensland, Australia.

== Subspecies ==
- Pingasa nobilis nobilis
- Pingasa nobilis furvifrons Prout, 1927
