= Pingasa blanda =

Scientific classification
- Kingdom: Animalia
- Phylum: Arthropoda
- Clade: Pancrustacea
- Class: Insecta
- Order: Lepidoptera
- Family: Geometridae
- Genus: Pingasa
- Species: P. blanda

Binomial name
- Pingasa blanda (Pagenstecher, 1900)

Synonyms
- Pseudoterpna blanda Pagenstecher, 1900; Pingasa acutangula Warren, 1903

Species of moth

Pingasa blanda is a moth of the family Geometridae first described by Arnold Pagenstecher in 1900. It is found on New Guinea, on the Bismarck Archipelago and in Queensland, Australia.

Adults are off white with wide brown margins.
