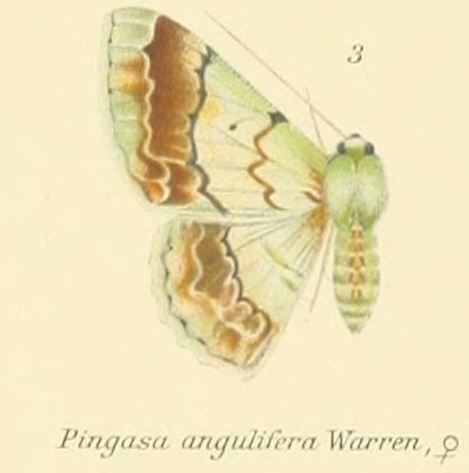

Scientific classification
- Kingdom: Animalia
- Phylum: Arthropoda
- Clade: Pancrustacea
- Class: Insecta
- Order: Lepidoptera
- Family: Geometridae
- Genus: Pingasa
- Species: P. angulifera

Binomial name
- Pingasa angulifera Warren, 1896

Synonyms
- Pingasa atriscripta Warren, 1899; Hypochroma munita Lucas, 1901

= Pingasa angulifera =

Species of moth

Pingasa angulifera is a moth of the family Geometridae first described by William Warren in 1896. It is found in Queensland, Australia.
