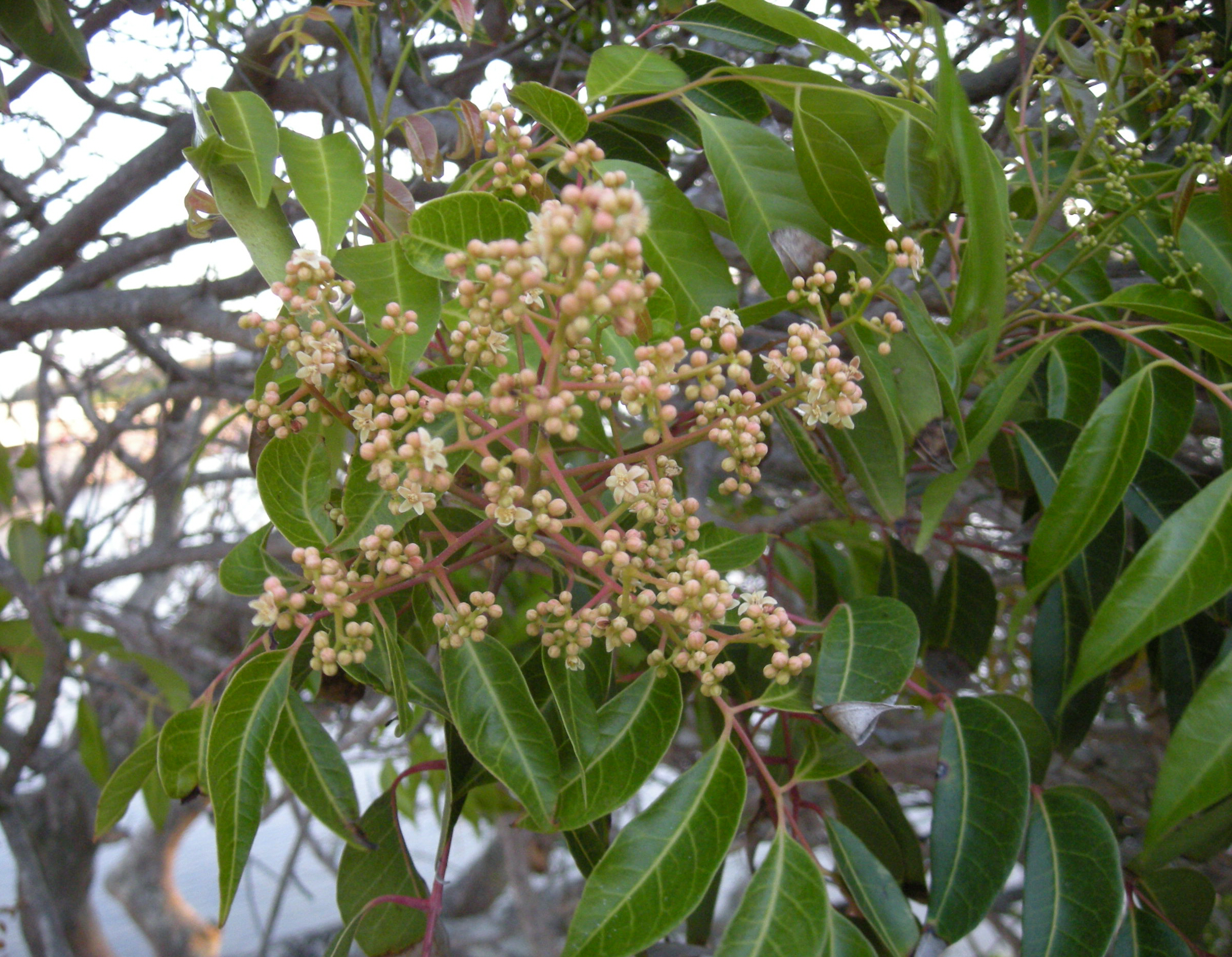

Scientific classification
- Kingdom: Plantae
- Clade: Tracheophytes
- Clade: Angiosperms
- Clade: Eudicots
- Clade: Rosids
- Order: Sapindales
- Family: Anacardiaceae
- Subfamily: Anacardioideae
- Genus: Euroschinus; Hook.f.

Type species
- Euroschinus falcatus Hook.f.

= Euroschinus =

Genus of flowering plants

Euroschinus is a genus of plant in family Anacardiaceae.

== Species ==
As of July 2020, the World Checklist of Selected Plant Families accepts 9 species:

- Euroschinus aoupiniensis Hoff — New Caledonia
- Euroschinus elegans Engl. — New Caledonia
- Euroschinus falcatus — Eastern Australia
- Euroschinus jaffrei Hoff — New Caledonia
- Euroschinus obtusifolius Engl. — New Caledonia
- Euroschinus papuanus Merr. & L.M.Perry
- Euroschinus rubromarginatus Baker f. — New Caledonia
- Euroschinus verrucosus Engl. — New Caledonia
- Euroschinus vieillardii Engl. — New Caledonia
