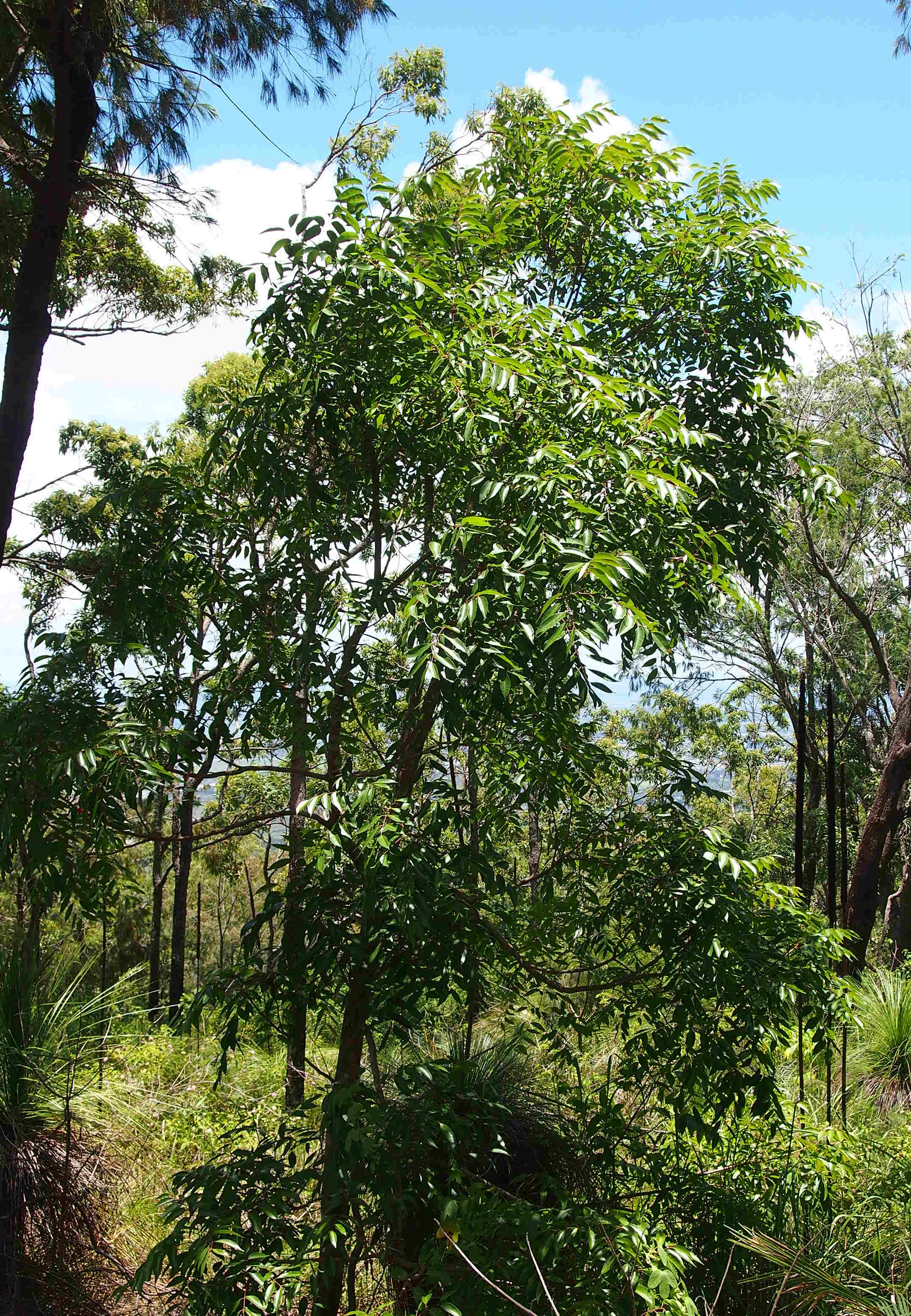
- Growing in open forest near Yeppoon, Queensland

Conservation status
- Least Concern (NCA)

Scientific classification
- Kingdom: Plantae
- Clade: Embryophytes
- Clade: Tracheophytes
- Clade: Spermatophytes
- Clade: Angiosperms
- Clade: Eudicots
- Clade: Rosids
- Order: Sapindales
- Family: Anacardiaceae
- Genus: Euroschinus
- Species: Euroschinus

Binomial name
- Euroschinus Hook.f.

Synonyms
- Euroschinus falcatus var. angustifolia Benth. (1863); Euroschinus falcatus var. typica Domin (1927); Euroschinus parvifolius S.Moore (1920); Rhus euroschina F.Muell. (1869); Sorindeia falcata Marchand (1869)

= Euroschinus falcatus =

Blush cudgerie

Species of plant in the cashew family

Euroschinus falcatus is a large tree in the mango and cashew family Anacardiaceae, found along almost the entire east coast of Australia from Cape York Peninsula to Jervis Bay. Common names include blush cudgerie and maiden's blush.

== Description ==
Euroschinus falcatus is a semi-deciduous tree growing up to 30 m (98 ft) tall, with wrinkly to tessellated grey brown bark. Larger specimens may be buttressed. Branchlets and twigs may be either finely hairy or hair-free. The compound leaves have between four and ten sickle-shaped leaflets measuring up to 15 by 7 cm (5.9 by 2.8 in). The leaflets have 6 to 11 pairs of lateral veins and are either opposite or alternately arranged, with no true terminal leaflet. Crushed leaves and broken twigs produce a clear sap with an odour similar to mango.

The conspicuous inflorescences are panicles up to 18 cm (7.1 in) long and are covered in fine pale hairs. The fragrant flowers are white, cream or green and held on very short pedicels (stalks) about 0.5 mm (0.02 in) long. The calyx is green or yellow with lobes up to 1 mm (0.04 in) long, petals are about 3 mm (0.12 in) long.

The fruit is a drupe, ellipsoidal or ovoid, and about 8 mm (0.31 in) long. They are green initially, becoming blue-purple or black when ripe, and they contain a single seed.

== Taxonomy ==
This species was first described in 1862 by the British botanist Joseph Dalton Hooker, based on specimens from "eastern tropical Australia". In his publication it can be seen that he named the plant Euroschinus falcatus, however the Australian Plant Name Index considers the orthographical variant Euroschinus falcata to be the correct combination, which is at odds with several other authorities such as the National Herbarium of New South Wales, the 2022 Census of the Queensland flora and fungi based on data from the Queensland Herbarium, Plants of the World Online, the Global Biodiversity Information Facility, World Flora Online, and the Catalogue of Life.

=== Etymology ===
The genus name Euroschinus is derived from the Latin eurus meaning east, and the existing South American genus Schinus. The species epithet falcatus is Latin for curved or sickle-shaped, referring to the leaves.

=== Vernacular names ===
A number of common names exist for this species, including blush cudgerie, maiden's blush, ribbonwood, chinaman's cedar, pink poplar, punburra, Port Macquarie beech and Jenny Donnelly.

== Distribution and habitat ==
The blush cudgerie is endemic to Australia's east coast, and its natural range extends from the Pascoe River near the top of Cape York Peninsula south to the Shoalhaven River in southeast New South Wales. It grows in tropical and sub-tropical rainforests, including beach forest and riparian forest, but is probably most common in monsoon forest. It also inhabits woodlands and the margins of sclerophyll forest. The altitudinal range is from sea level to about 1,000 m (3,300 ft).

== Ecology ==
The fruit are eaten by various bird species, including Lewin's honeyeater (Meliphaga lewinii), rose-crowned fruit dove (Ptilinopus regina), topknot pigeon (Lopholaimus antarcticus), crimson rosella (Platycercus elegans), green catbird (Ailuroedus crassirostris), silvereye (Zosterops lateralis) and paradise riflebird (Ptiloris paradiseus). The leaves eaten by Lumholtz's tree-kangaroo (Dendrolagus lumholtzi).

== Gallery ==
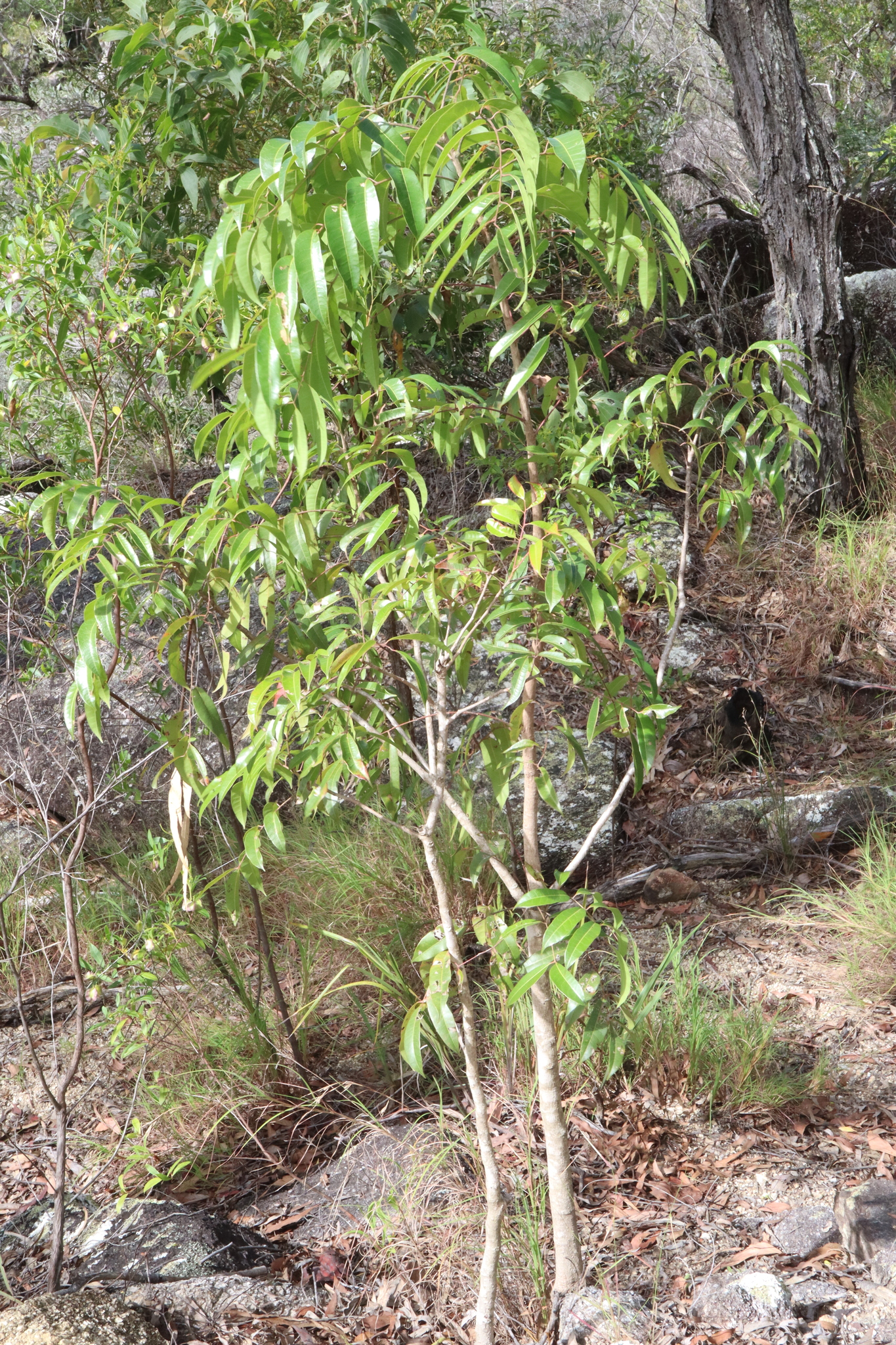
Young tree

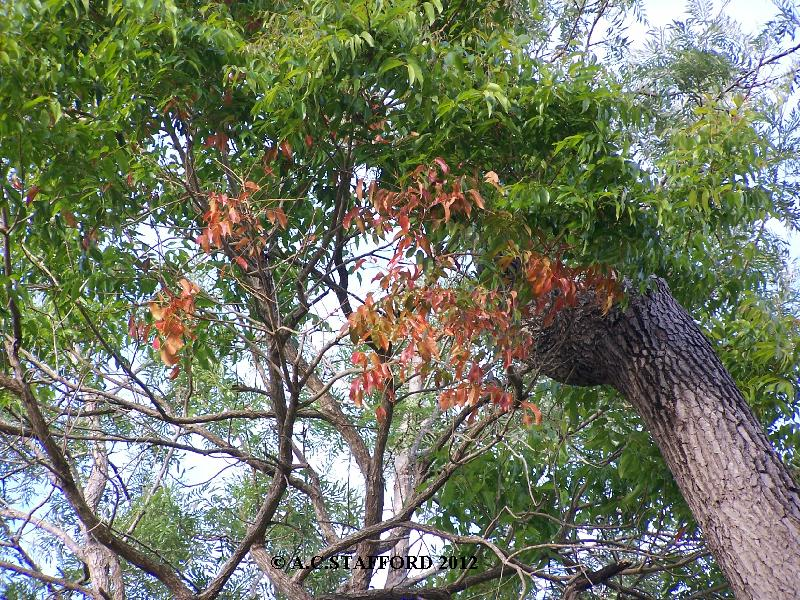
Trunk and red new growth

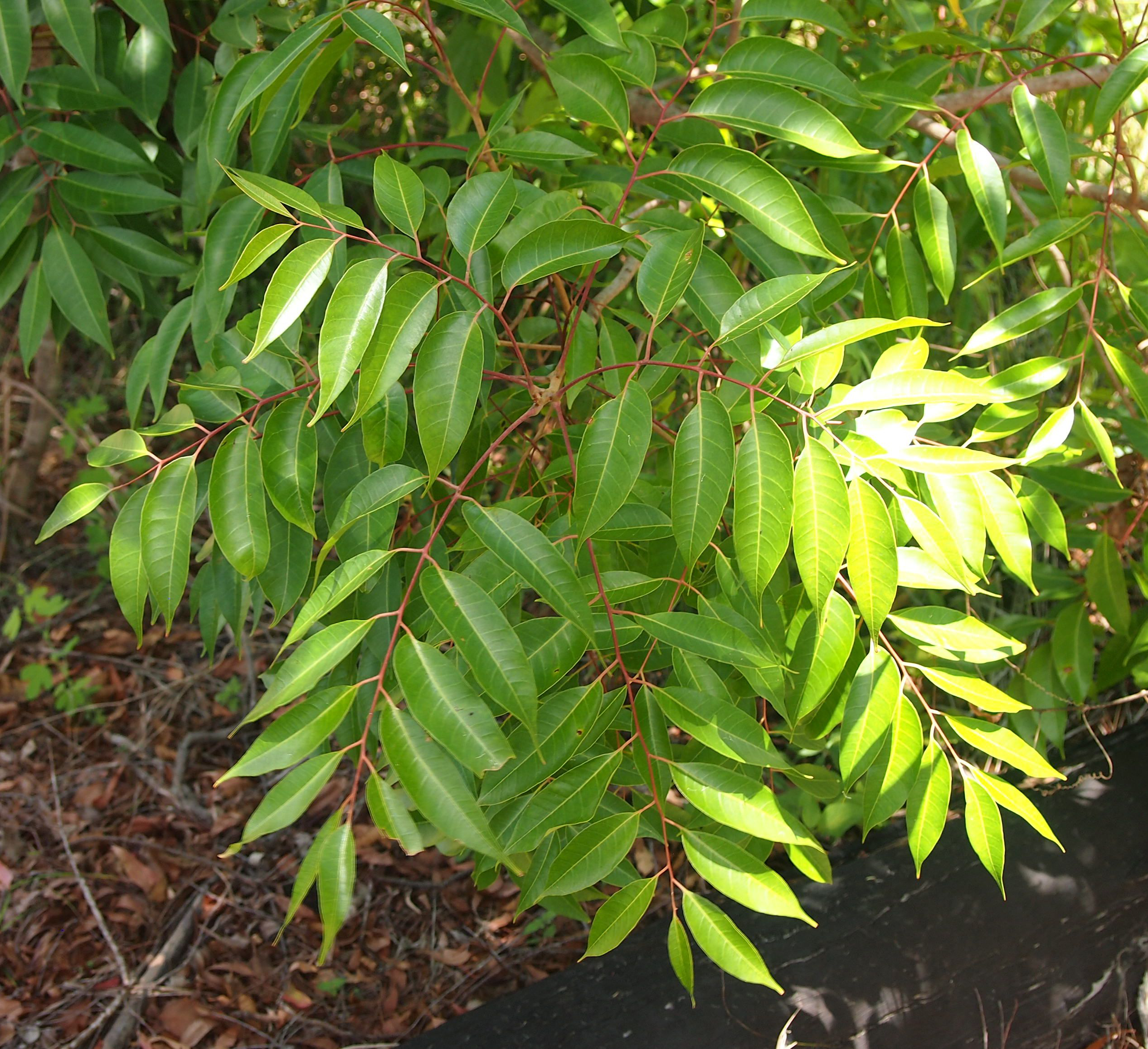
Foliage

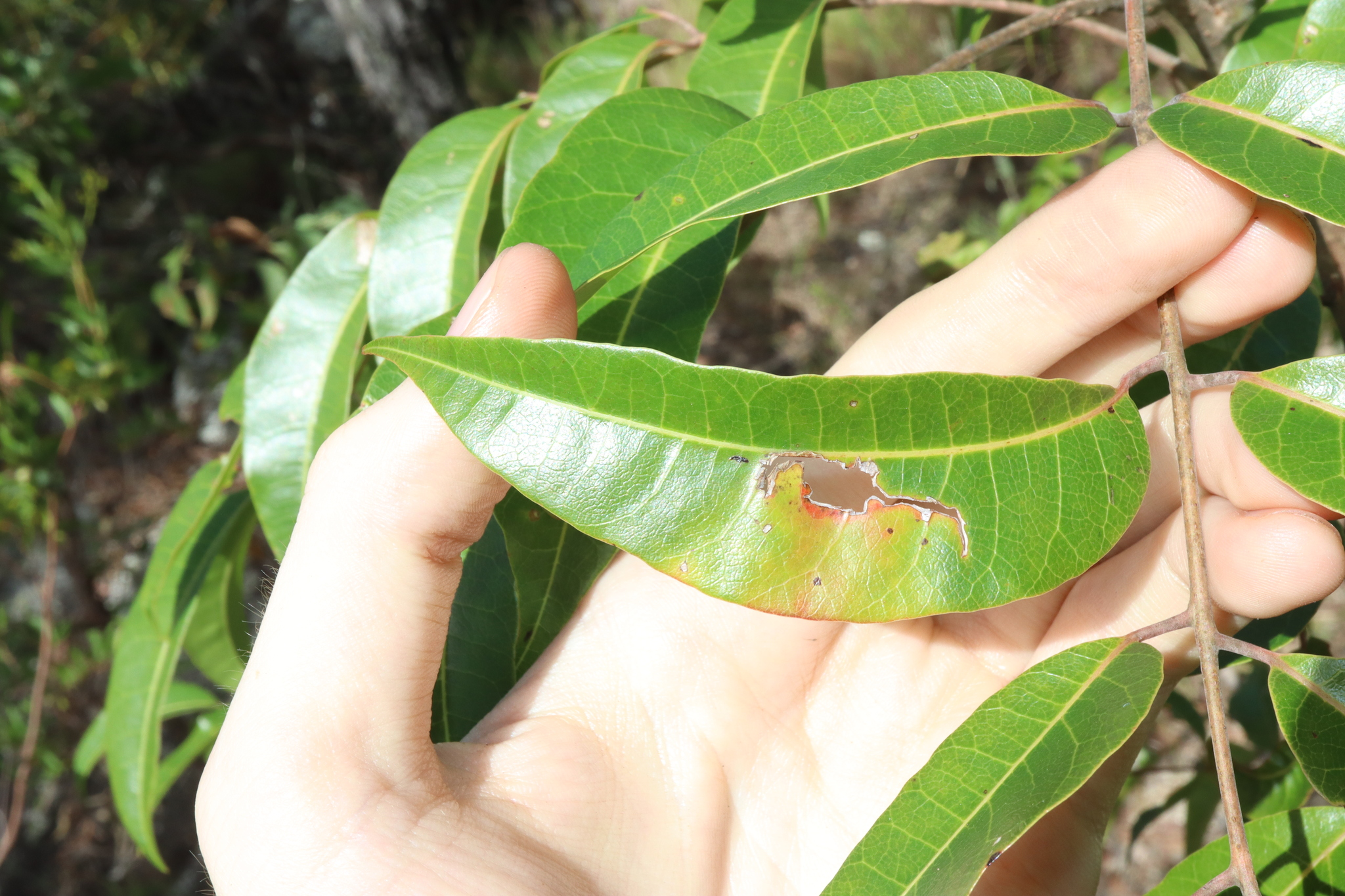
Detail of leaf

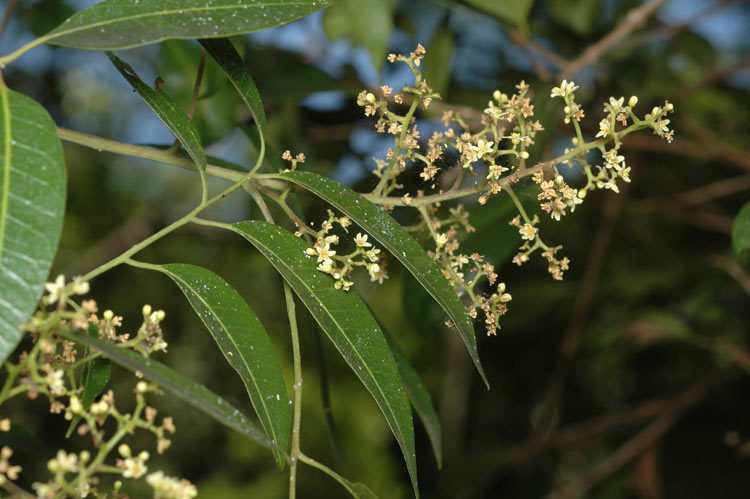
Inflorescence

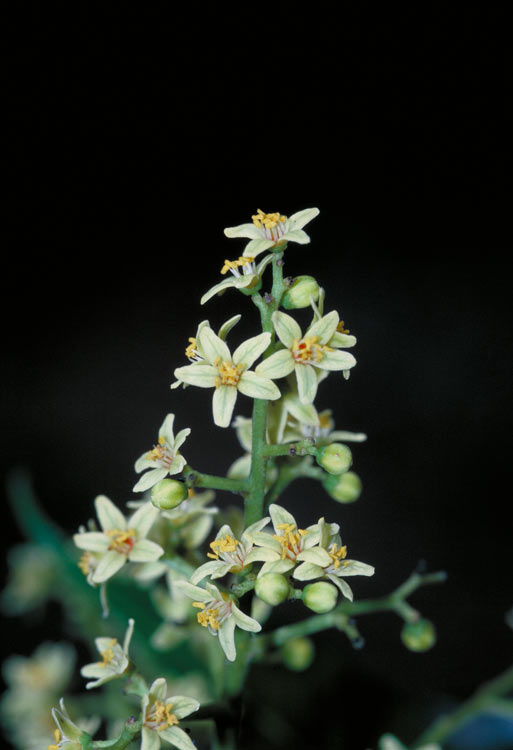
Close-up of flowers

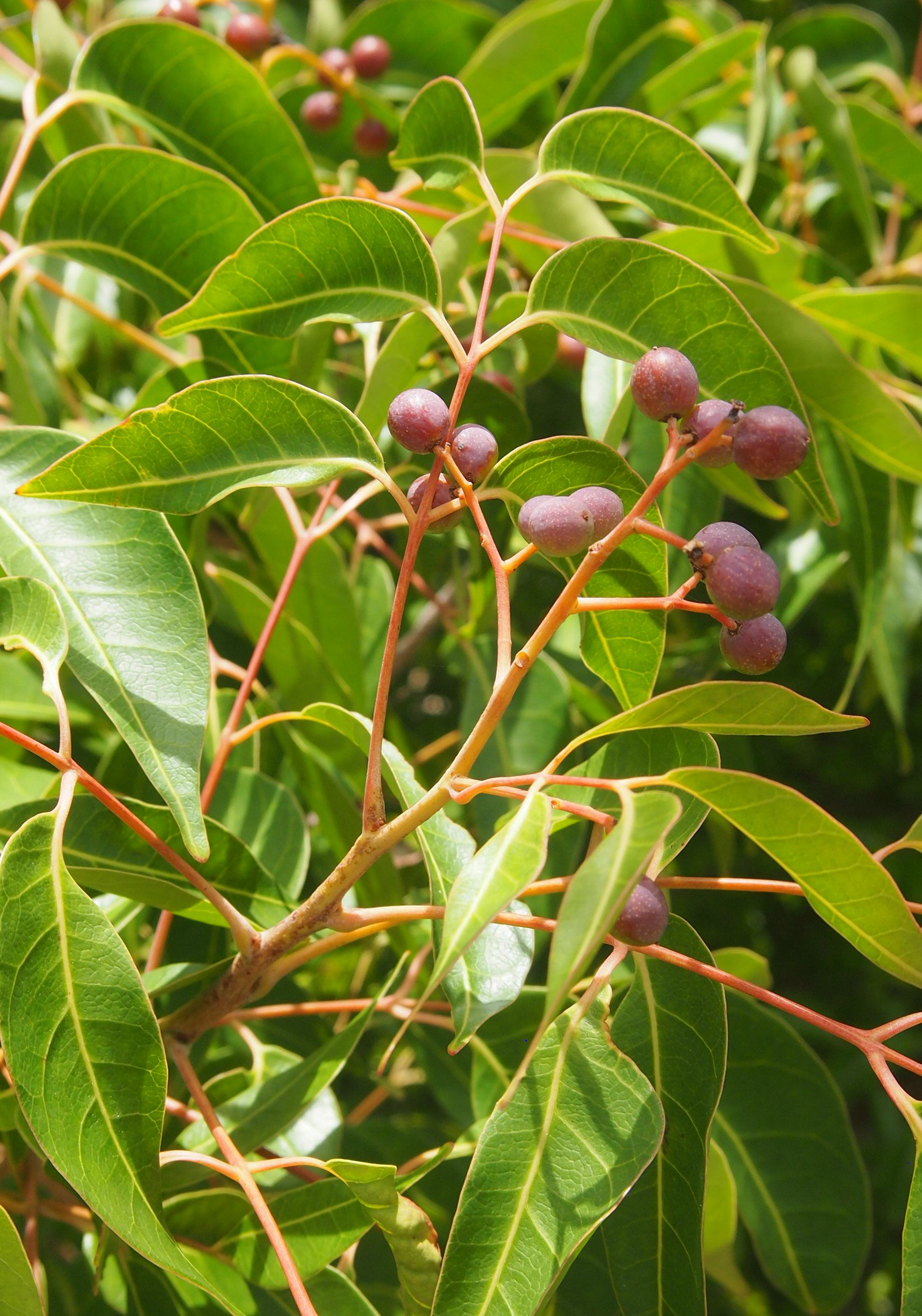
Fruit

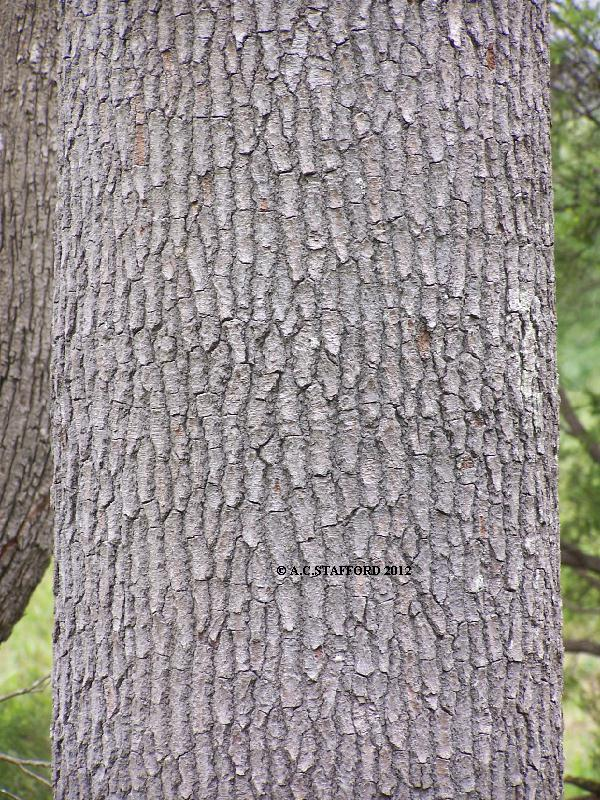
Bark
