= Pingasa multispurcata =

Scientific classification
- Kingdom: Animalia
- Phylum: Arthropoda
- Clade: Pancrustacea
- Class: Insecta
- Order: Lepidoptera
- Family: Geometridae
- Genus: Pingasa
- Species: P. multispurcata

Binomial name
- Pingasa multispurcata L. B. Prout, 1913

Species of moth

Pingasa multispurcata is a moth of the family Geometridae first described by Louis Beethoven Prout in 1913. It is found in Yemen, Arabia, Iraq, from Iran to Pakistan and in north-western India.

The larvae feed on Sclerocarya birrea.
