= P. maxima =

P. maxima may refer to:

- Paracrocidura maxima, an African mammal
- Pectinodonta maxima, a true limpet
- Phyllosticta maxima, a plant pathogen
- Pinctada maxima, a pearl oyster
- Pisulina maxima, a cave snail
- Pitta maxima, a bird endemic to North Maluku
- Pollex maxima, an Indonesian moth
- Premna maxima, a plant endemic to Kenya
- Problepsis maxima, a Japanese moth
- Psetta maxima, a demersal fish
- Pseudoeurycea maxima, a salamander endemic to Mexico
- Purlovia maxima, a therocephalian therapsid
