= Bulli =

Bulli may refer to:

- Bulli, New South Wales, Australia, a suburb of Wollongong
  - Bulli FC, a semi-professional football club
  - Bulli Shire, a former local government area
  - Bulli railway station
  - Electoral district of Bulli
- Bulli (plant), a species of tree in the family Asteraceae
- Manoba bulli, a moth of family Nolidae
- Pollex bulli, a moth of family Erebidae
- Volkswagen Type 2 or Volkswagen Microbus Concept, vehicles sometimes called a Bulli
- Bulli Bai, cyber-stalking website in India

== See also ==
- Buli (disambiguation)
- Bullis (disambiguation)
- Bully (disambiguation)
