= Bullis =

Bullis may refer to:

- Bullis (surname)
- Bullis School, school in Potomac, Maryland, United States
- Bullis (butterfly), butterfly genus
- Camp Bullis, U.S. Army training camp in Bexar County, Texas

== See also ==
- Bulis, a genus of beetle
- Bulli (disambiguation)
- Bullace
