= Problepsis plagiata =

Scientific classification
- Kingdom: Animalia
- Phylum: Arthropoda
- Clade: Pancrustacea
- Class: Insecta
- Order: Lepidoptera
- Family: Geometridae
- Genus: Problepsis
- Species: P. plagiata

Binomial name
- Problepsis plagiata (Butler, 1881)

Synonyms
- Argyris plagiata Butler, 1881; Problepsis riminota Prout, 1938

Species of moth

Problepsis plagiata is a moth of the family Geometridae. It is found from north-eastern China to Japan, Korea and south-eastern Russia.
