= Pollex taurus =

Scientific classification
- Domain: Eukaryota
- Kingdom: Animalia
- Phylum: Arthropoda
- Class: Insecta
- Order: Lepidoptera
- Superfamily: Noctuoidea
- Family: Erebidae
- Genus: Pollex
- Species: P. taurus

Binomial name
- Pollex taurus Fibiger, 2007

Species of moth

Pollex taurus is a moth of the family Erebidae first described by Michael Fibiger in 2007. It is known from Mindanao in the Philippines.

The wingspan is about 13 mm.
