= Problepsis deliaria =

Scientific classification
- Kingdom: Animalia
- Phylum: Arthropoda
- Clade: Pancrustacea
- Class: Insecta
- Order: Lepidoptera
- Family: Geometridae
- Genus: Problepsis
- Species: P. deliaria

Binomial name
- Problepsis deliaria Guenée, [1858]

Species of moth

Problepsis deliaria is a moth of the family Geometridae. It is found in Sri Lanka.

== Description ==
Its wingspan is 46 mm. Antennae of male bipectinated, with stiff branches. Apex simple. Nearly pure white moth. Sides of palpi and vertex of head black. Abdomen tinged with fuscous. Forewings with fuscous costa. A large olive oval ocellus found at end of a cell, with a ring of raised silver scales on it, whereas a greyish center, and two black specks below the center. Below the ocellus is a silver-ringed fulvous spot. a silver fascia found on the inner margin. Hindwings with an elongate oval fuscous mark on discocellulars and below the cell, with a ring of silver scales on it. A silver fascia is present on the inner margin. Both wings with waved and curved fuscous postmedial bands with a more prominent maculate band beyond it, and a series of spots just inside the margin. A marginal fuscous line and a line through cilia can be seen.
