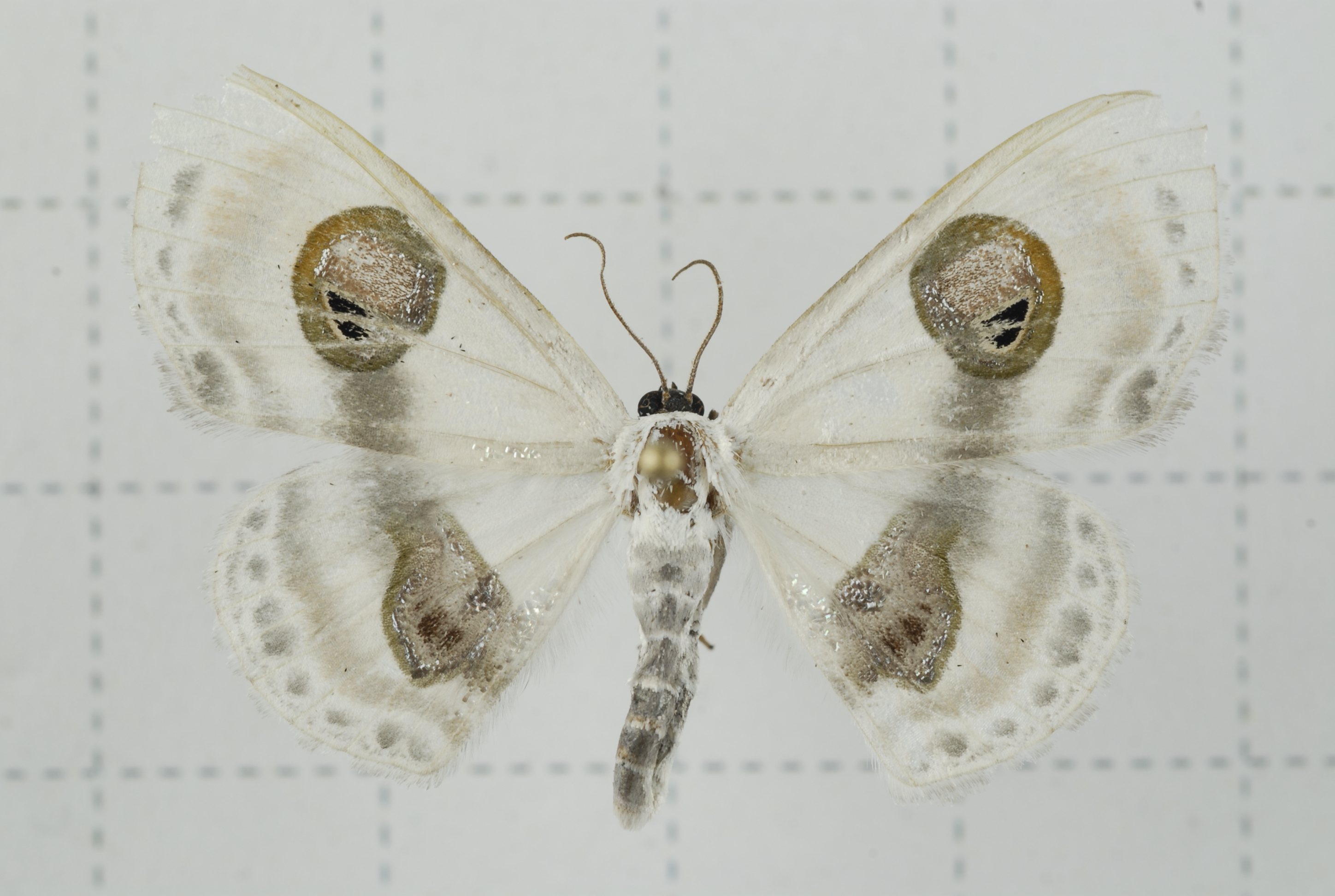

Scientific classification
- Kingdom: Animalia
- Phylum: Arthropoda
- Clade: Pancrustacea
- Class: Insecta
- Order: Lepidoptera
- Family: Geometridae
- Genus: Problepsis
- Species: P. conjunctiva

Binomial name
- Problepsis conjunctiva Prout, 1917

= Problepsis conjunctiva =

Species of moth

Problepsis conjunctiva is a moth of the family Geometridae. It is found in India (Sikkim), China (Hainan) and Taiwan.

The wingspan is 28–37 mm.

== Subspecies ==
- Problepsis conjunctiva conjunctiva (India: Sikkim)
- Problepsis conjunctiva subjunctiva Warren, 1893 (China: Hainan)
