= Problepsis phoebearia =

Scientific classification
- Kingdom: Animalia
- Phylum: Arthropoda
- Clade: Pancrustacea
- Class: Insecta
- Order: Lepidoptera
- Family: Geometridae
- Genus: Problepsis
- Species: P. phoebearia

Binomial name
- Problepsis phoebearia Erschoff, 1870

Synonyms
- Argyris deliaria Bremer, 1864

Species of moth

Problepsis phoebearia is a moth of the family Geometridae described by Nikolay Grigoryevich Erschoff in 1870. It is found from north-eastern China to south-eastern Russia.
