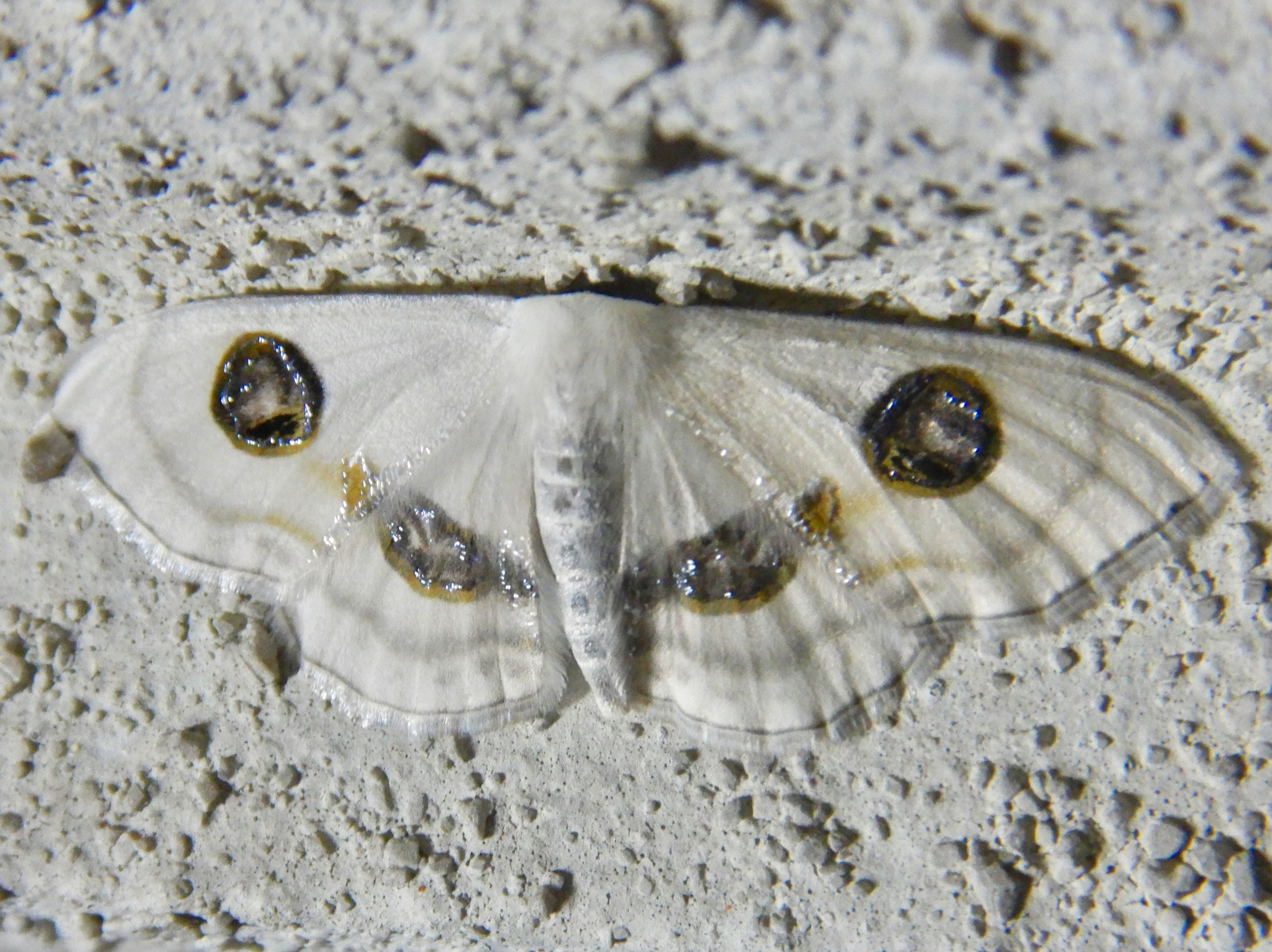

Scientific classification
- Kingdom: Animalia
- Phylum: Arthropoda
- Clade: Pancrustacea
- Class: Insecta
- Order: Lepidoptera
- Family: Geometridae
- Genus: Problepsis
- Species: P. superans

Binomial name
- Problepsis superans Butler, 1885

= Problepsis superans =

Species of moth

Problepsis superans is a moth of the family Geometridae. It is found in Japan, Taiwan, Russia and China.

The wingspan is 47–50 mm.

== Subspecies ==
- Problepsis superans superans (Japan)
- Problepsis superans summa Prout, 1935 (China)
