= Problepsis shirozui =

Scientific classification
- Kingdom: Animalia
- Phylum: Arthropoda
- Clade: Pancrustacea
- Class: Insecta
- Order: Lepidoptera
- Family: Geometridae
- Genus: Problepsis
- Species: P. shirozui

Binomial name
- Problepsis shirozui Inoue, 1986

Species of moth

Problepsis shirozui is a moth of the family Geometridae. It is found in Taiwan.
