= Pollex dumogai =

Scientific classification
- Domain: Eukaryota
- Kingdom: Animalia
- Phylum: Arthropoda
- Class: Insecta
- Order: Lepidoptera
- Superfamily: Noctuoidea
- Family: Erebidae
- Genus: Pollex
- Species: P. dumogai

Binomial name
- Pollex dumogai Fibiger, 2007

Species of moth

Pollex dumogai is a moth of the family Erebidae first described by Michael Fibiger in 2007. It is known from northern Sulawesi in Indonesia.
