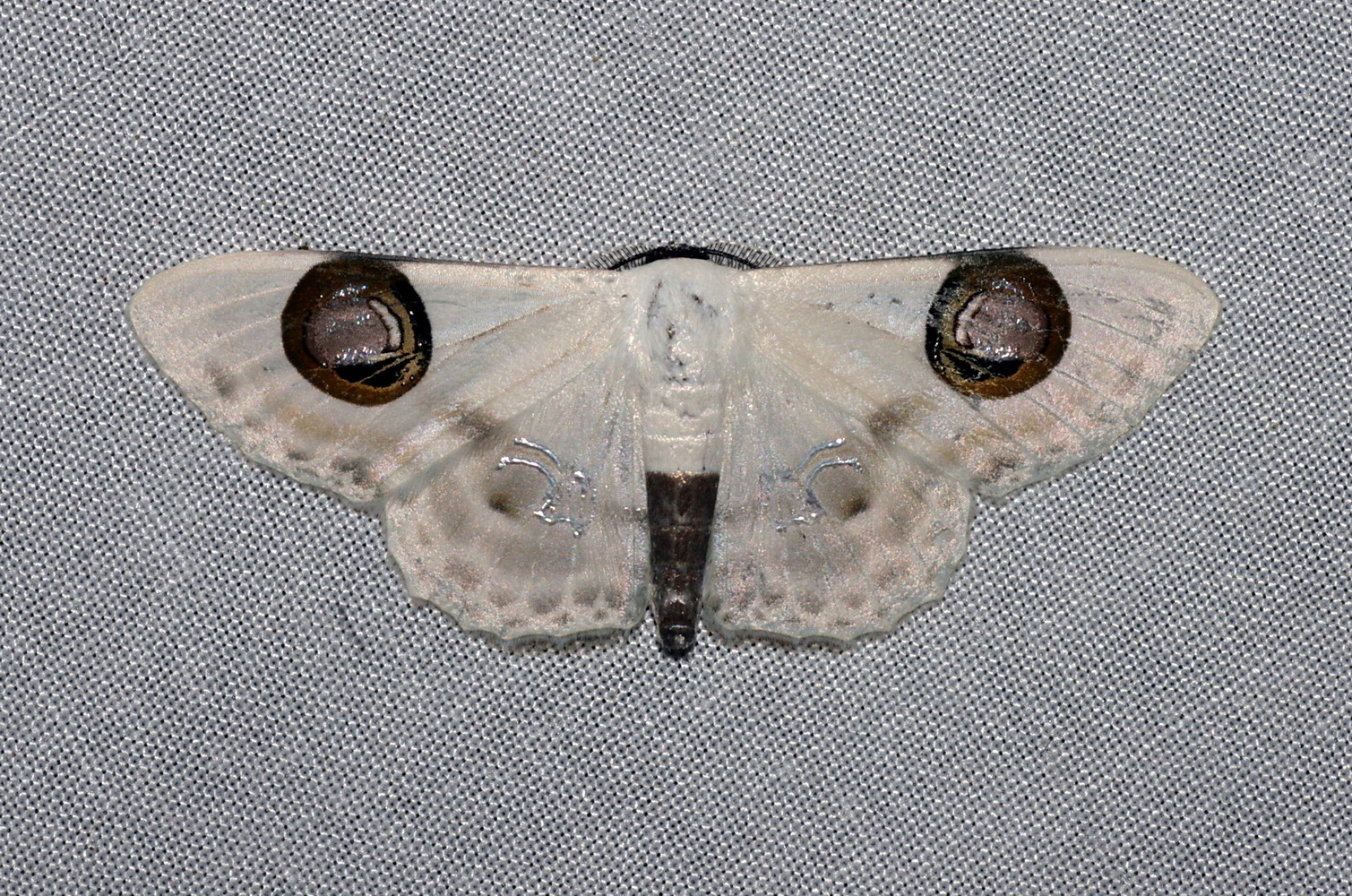

Scientific classification
- Kingdom: Animalia
- Phylum: Arthropoda
- Clade: Pancrustacea
- Class: Insecta
- Order: Lepidoptera
- Family: Geometridae
- Genus: Problepsis
- Species: P. plenorbis

Binomial name
- Problepsis plenorbis Prout, 1917

= Problepsis plenorbis =

Species of moth

Problepsis plenorbis is a species of moth of the family Geometridae. It is found in Peninsular Malaysia, Sumatra and Borneo.
