= Problepsis subreferta =

Scientific classification
- Kingdom: Animalia
- Phylum: Arthropoda
- Clade: Pancrustacea
- Class: Insecta
- Order: Lepidoptera
- Family: Geometridae
- Genus: Problepsis
- Species: P. subreferta

Binomial name
- Problepsis subreferta Prout, 1935

Species of moth

Problepsis subreferta is a moth of the family Geometridae. It is found in China.
