= Problepsis korinchiana =

Scientific classification
- Kingdom: Animalia
- Phylum: Arthropoda
- Clade: Pancrustacea
- Class: Insecta
- Order: Lepidoptera
- Family: Geometridae
- Genus: Problepsis
- Species: P. korinchiana

Binomial name
- Problepsis korinchiana Rothschild, 1920

Species of moth

Problepsis korinchiana is a moth of the family Geometridae. It is found on Sumatra.
