= Problepsis paredra =

Scientific classification
- Kingdom: Animalia
- Phylum: Arthropoda
- Clade: Pancrustacea
- Class: Insecta
- Order: Lepidoptera
- Family: Geometridae
- Genus: Problepsis
- Species: P. paredra

Binomial name
- Problepsis paredra Prout, 1917

Species of moth

Problepsis paredra is a moth of the family Geometridae. It is found in western China.
