= Problepsis clemens =

Scientific classification
- Kingdom: Animalia
- Phylum: Arthropoda
- Clade: Pancrustacea
- Class: Insecta
- Order: Lepidoptera
- Family: Geometridae
- Genus: Problepsis
- Species: P. clemens

Binomial name
- Problepsis clemens Lucas, 1890

Synonyms
- Problepsis margaritata Warren, 1896

Species of moth

Problepsis clemens is a moth of the family Geometridae. It is found in Australia (Queensland).
