= Buli =

Buli may refer to:

- Buli, Halmahera, a town near Maba the capital city of East Halmahera Regency, North Maluku, Indonesia
  - Buli Airport, the airport in Buli
  - Buli language (Indonesia)
- Buli language (disambiguation), several languages with the name
- Buli Rural District, in Iran
- Butyllithium, sometimes abbreviated BuLi, a strong base used in chemical synthesis
- Buli (film), a 2004 Malaysian drama black comedy film
- Buli, Muntinlupa, a barangay of the city of Muntinlupa, Philippines

== See also ==
- Buli (disambiguation)
