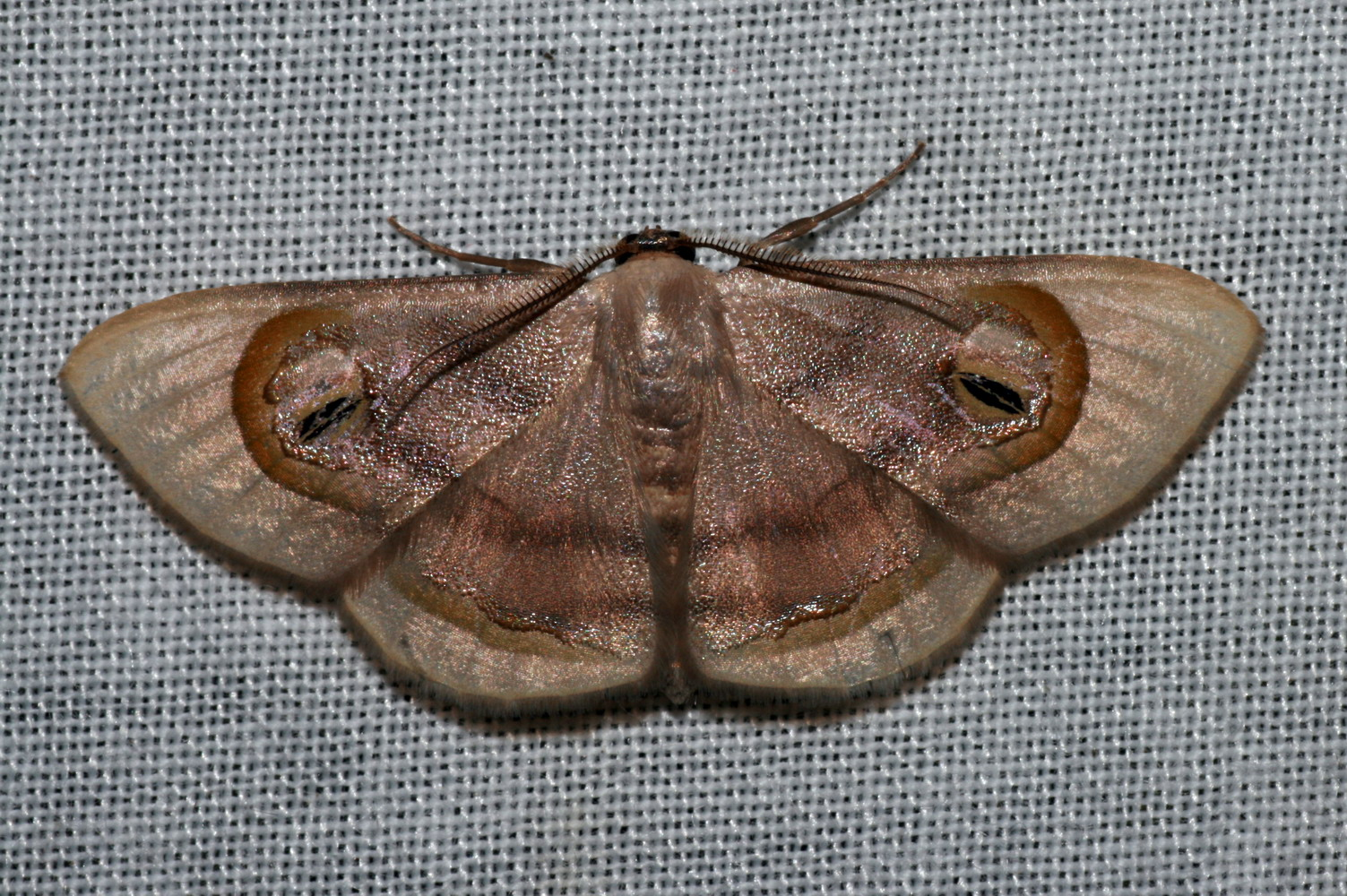

Scientific classification
- Kingdom: Animalia
- Phylum: Arthropoda
- Clade: Pancrustacea
- Class: Insecta
- Order: Lepidoptera
- Family: Geometridae
- Genus: Problepsis
- Species: P. achlyobathra

Binomial name
- Problepsis achlyobathra Prout, 1928

Synonyms
- Problepsis achlyobathra violescens Prout, 1934; Problepsis emphyla Prout, 1938

= Problepsis achlyobathra =

Species of moth

Problepsis achlyobathra is a species of moth of the family Geometridae. It is found in Sumatra, Peninsular Malaysia, Borneo, Java and Sulawesi.

== Subspecies ==
- Problepsis achlyobathra achlyobathra
- Problepsis achlyobathra emphyla Prout, 1938 (Sulawesi)
- Problepsis achlyobathra violescens Prout, 1934 (Java)
