= Problepsis lucifimbria =

Scientific classification
- Kingdom: Animalia
- Phylum: Arthropoda
- Clade: Pancrustacea
- Class: Insecta
- Order: Lepidoptera
- Family: Geometridae
- Genus: Problepsis
- Species: P. lucifimbria

Binomial name
- Problepsis lucifimbria (Warren, 1902)

Synonyms
- Problepsiodes lucifimbria Warren, 1902

Species of moth

Problepsis lucifimbria is a moth of the family Geometridae. It is found on Sumatra.
