= Problepsis magna =

Scientific classification
- Kingdom: Animalia
- Phylum: Arthropoda
- Clade: Pancrustacea
- Class: Insecta
- Order: Lepidoptera
- Family: Geometridae
- Genus: Problepsis
- Species: P. magna

Binomial name
- Problepsis magna Warren, 1906

Species of moth

Problepsis magna is a moth of the family Geometridae. It is found in New Guinea.
