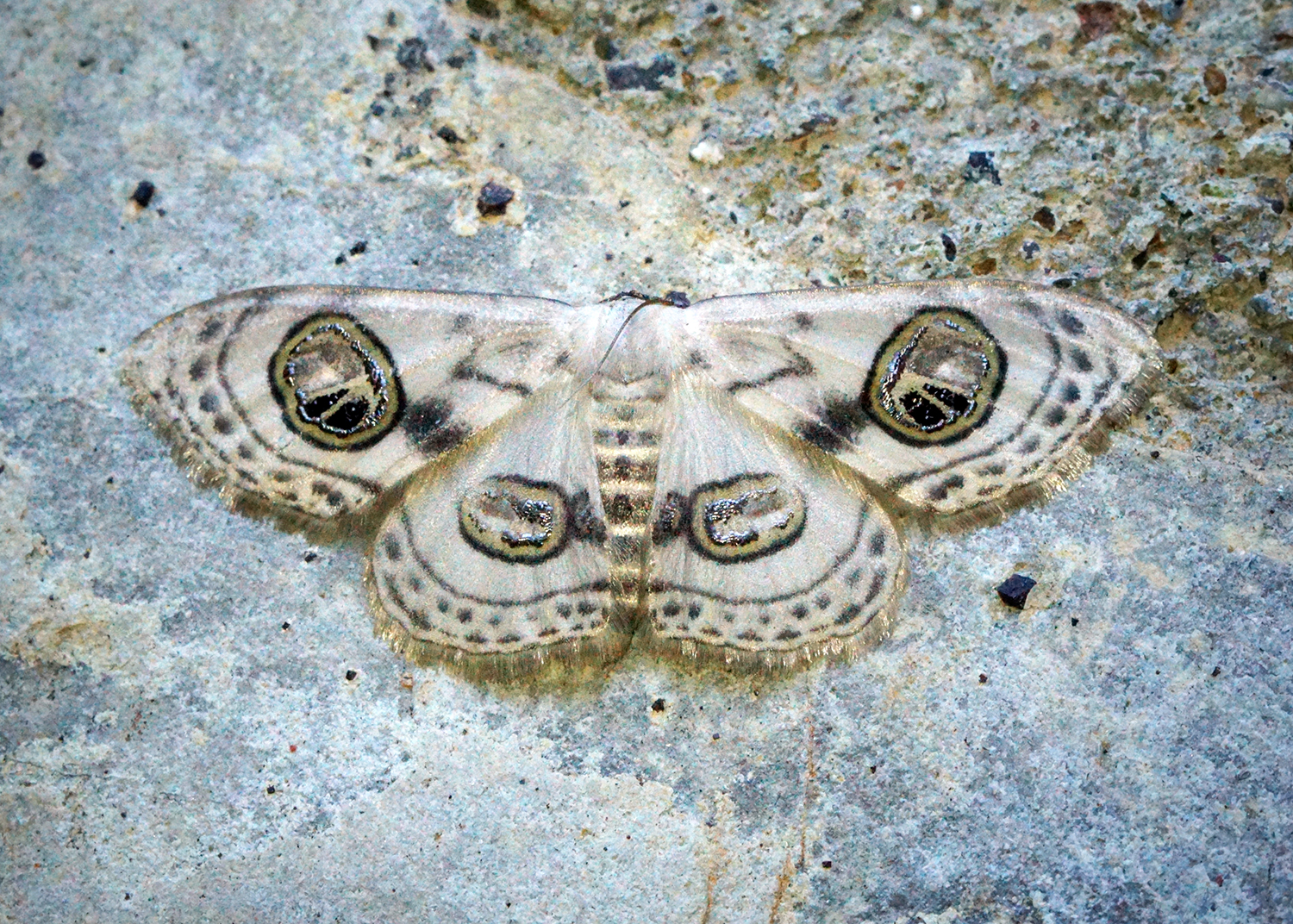

Scientific classification
- Kingdom: Animalia
- Phylum: Arthropoda
- Clade: Pancrustacea
- Class: Insecta
- Order: Lepidoptera
- Family: Geometridae
- Genus: Problepsis
- Species: P. ocellata

Binomial name
- Problepsis ocellata (Frivaldszky, 1845)

Synonyms
- Caloptera ocellata Frivaldsky, 1845; Argyris ommatophoraria Guenee, 1857; Argyris cinerea Butler, 1886

= Problepsis ocellata =

Species of moth

Problepsis ocellata is a moth of the family Geometridae.

== Distribution ==
It is found in Andorra, Greece, Crete, Cyprus, Turkey and the Near East.

== Description ==
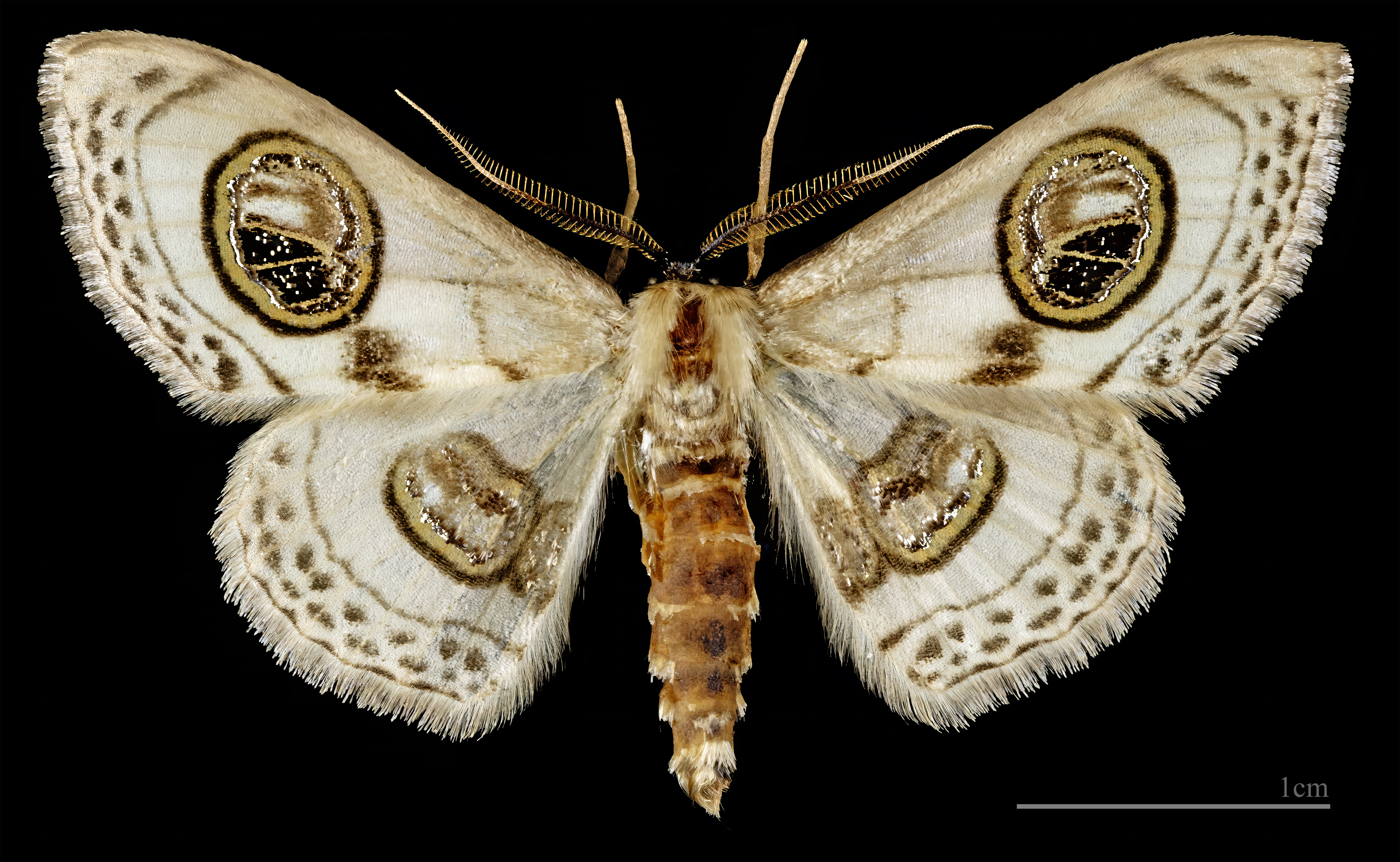
Problepsis ocellata ♂

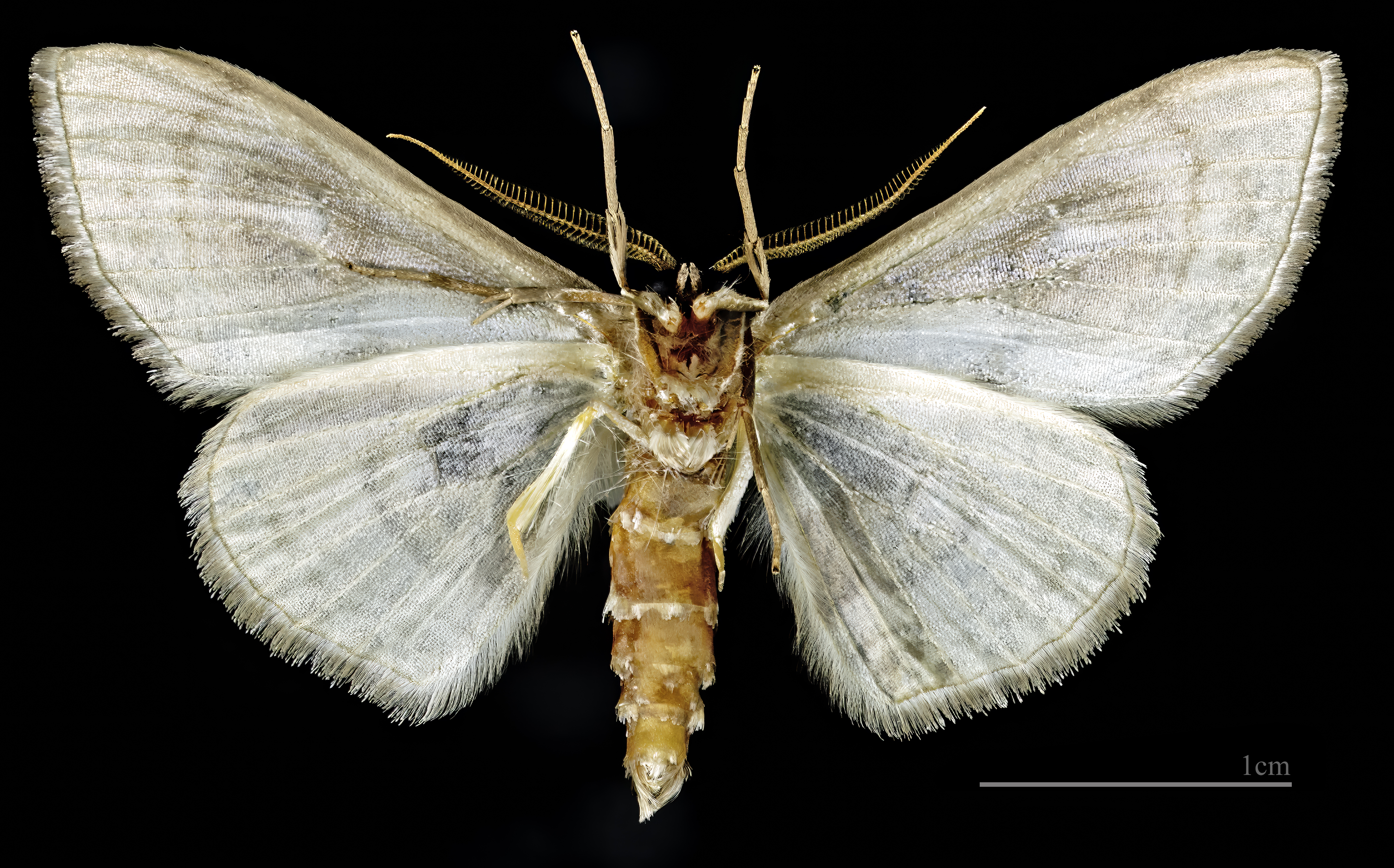
Problepsis ocellata ♂ △

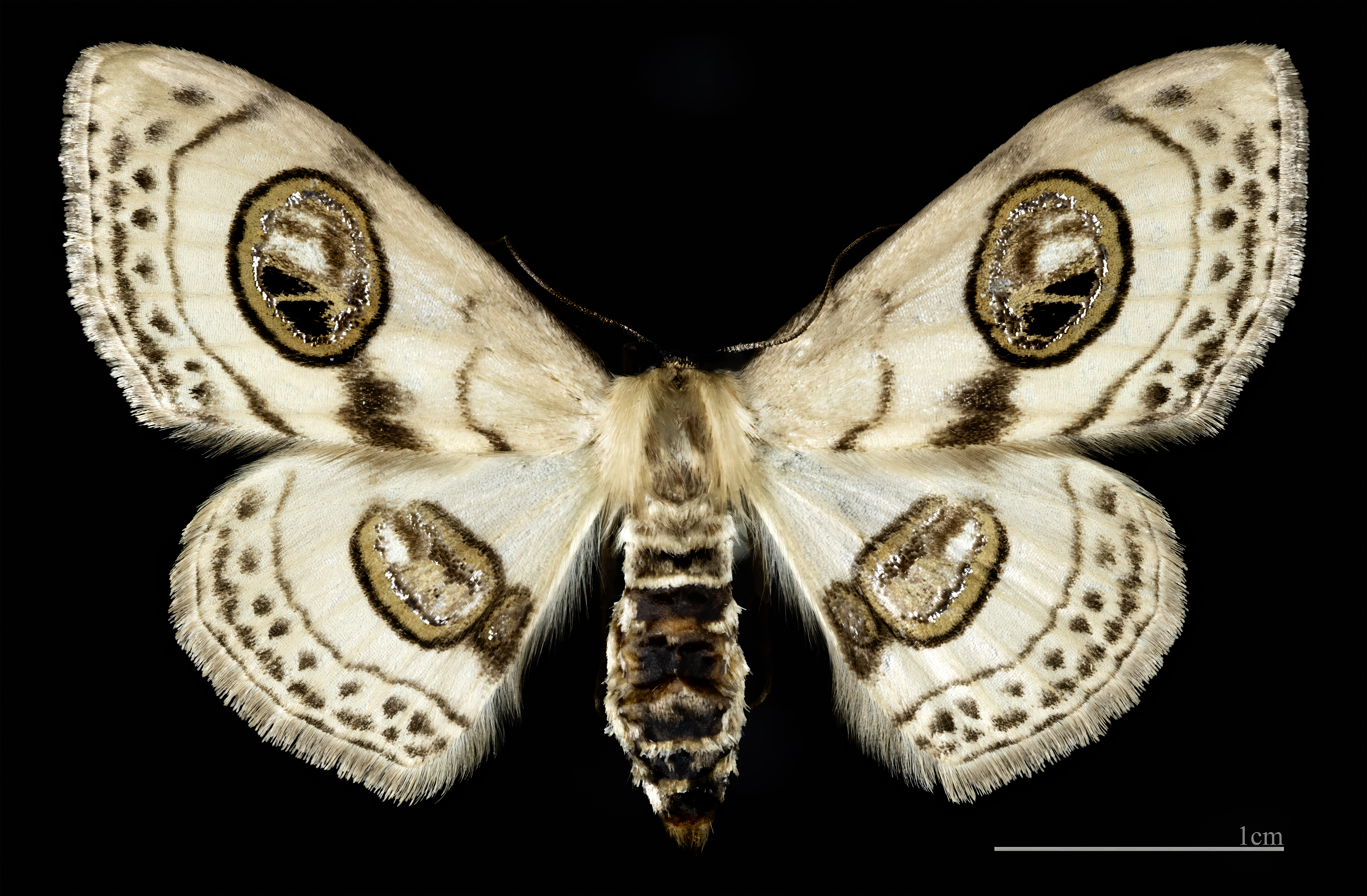
Problepsis ocellata ♀

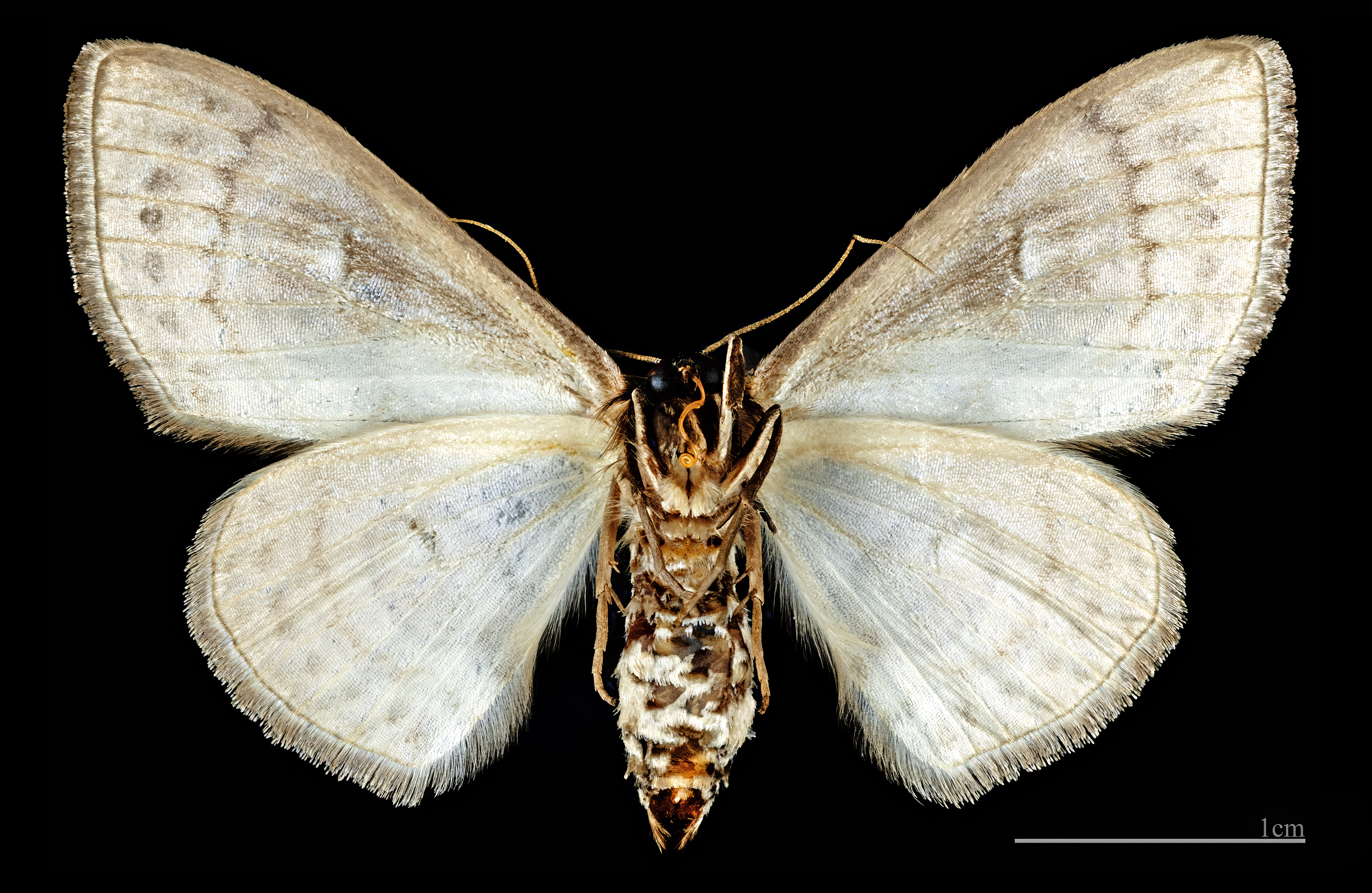
Problepsis ocellata ♀ △

== Biology ==
The larvae feed on Olea europaea.

== Subspecies ==
- Problepsis ocellata ocellata
- Problepsis ocellata cinerea (Butler, 1886)
