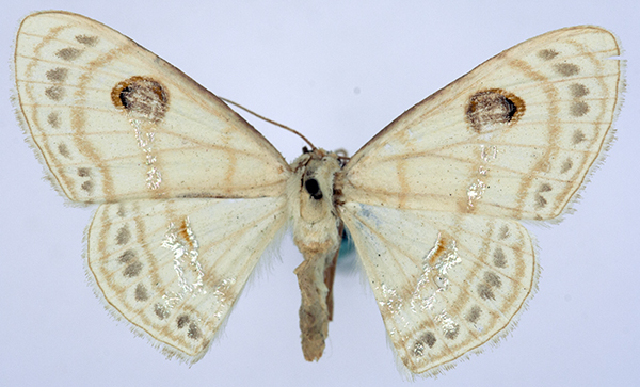

Scientific classification
- Kingdom: Animalia
- Phylum: Arthropoda
- Clade: Pancrustacea
- Class: Insecta
- Order: Lepidoptera
- Family: Geometridae
- Genus: Problepsis
- Species: P. apollinaria

Binomial name
- Problepsis apollinaria (Guenée, [1858])

Synonyms
- Argyris apollinaria Guenee, 1857

= Problepsis apollinaria =

Species of moth

Problepsis apollinaria is a moth of the family Geometridae. It is found from the Indian Subregion to New Guinea and Queensland.

== Subspecies ==
- Problepsis apollinaria apollinaria
- Problepsis apollinaria aphylacta Prout, 1938
- Problepsis apollinaria candidior Prout, 1917
- Problepsis apollinaria deparcata Prout, 1925
- Problepsis apollinaria hemicyclata Warren, 1897
- Problepsis apollinaria wilemani West, 1930
