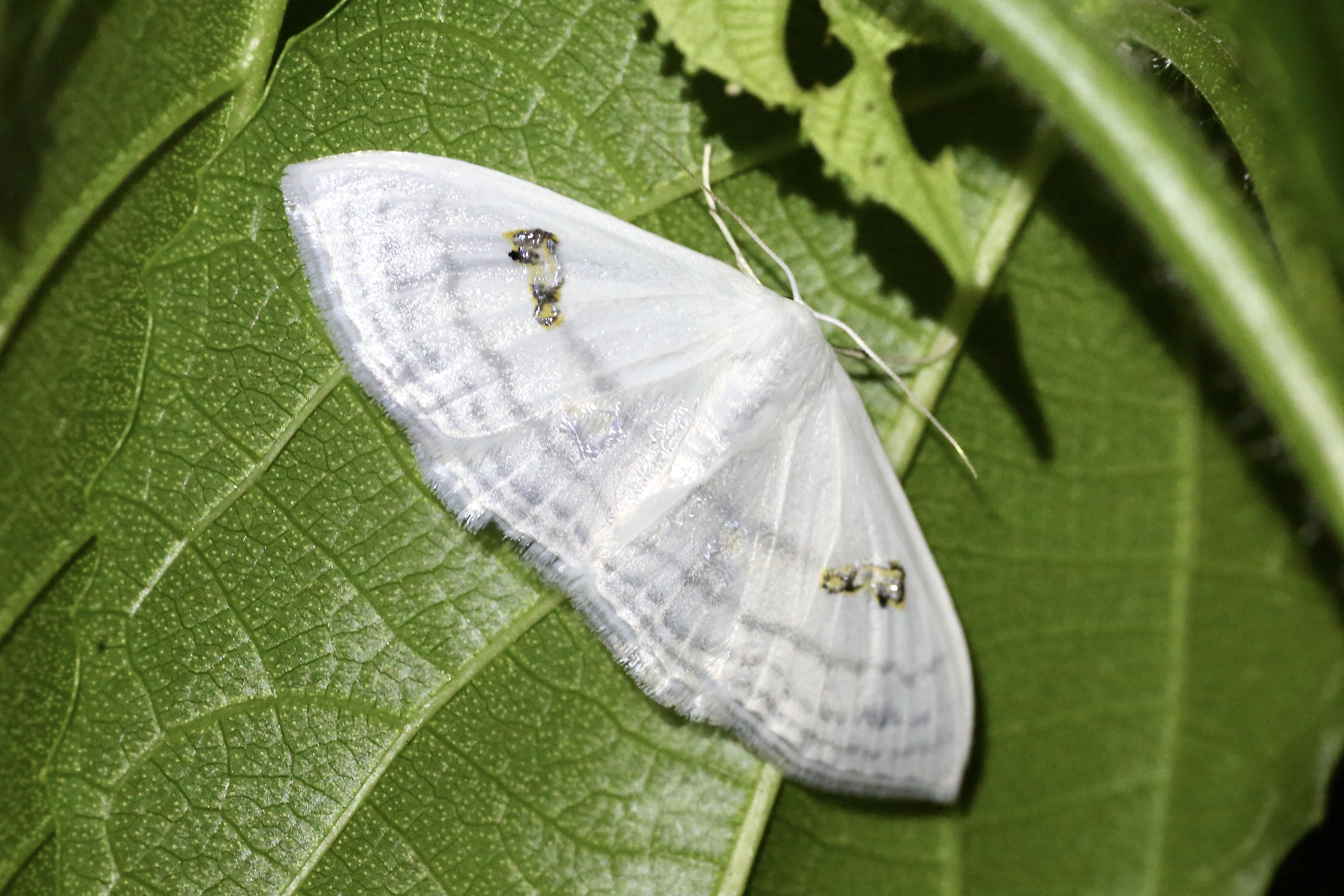
- In Zimbabwe highlands.

Scientific classification
- Kingdom: Animalia
- Phylum: Arthropoda
- Clade: Pancrustacea
- Class: Insecta
- Order: Lepidoptera
- Family: Geometridae
- Genus: Problepsis
- Species: P. aegretta

Binomial name
- Problepsis aegretta Felder & Rogenhofer, 1875

Synonyms
- Problepsis egretta Hale-Carpenter, 1932 [misspelling]

= Problepsis aegretta =

Species of moth

Problepsis aegretta is a moth of the family Geometridae. It is found in Kenya, Congo, Uganda, Zimbabwe, and South Africa.

== Subspecies ==
- Problepsis aegretta aegretta (South Africa)
- Problepsis aegretta insculpta Prout, 1917 (Kenya, Uganda)
