= Problepsis ochripicta =

Scientific classification
- Kingdom: Animalia
- Phylum: Arthropoda
- Clade: Pancrustacea
- Class: Insecta
- Order: Lepidoptera
- Family: Geometridae
- Genus: Problepsis
- Species: P. ochripicta

Binomial name
- Problepsis ochripicta Warren, 1901

Species of moth

Problepsis ochripicta is a moth of the family Geometridae first described by William Warren in 1901. It is found in Sierra Leone and on the islands São Tomé and Annobón.
