= Problepsis herbuloti =

Scientific classification
- Kingdom: Animalia
- Phylum: Arthropoda
- Clade: Pancrustacea
- Class: Insecta
- Order: Lepidoptera
- Family: Geometridae
- Genus: Problepsis
- Species: P. herbuloti

Binomial name
- Problepsis herbuloti Viette, 1968

Species of moth

Problepsis herbuloti is a moth of the family Geometridae. It is found in Madagascar.
