= Pollex parabala =

Scientific classification
- Kingdom: Animalia
- Phylum: Arthropoda
- Clade: Pancrustacea
- Class: Insecta
- Order: Lepidoptera
- Superfamily: Noctuoidea
- Family: Erebidae
- Genus: Pollex
- Species: P. parabala

Binomial name
- Pollex parabala Fibiger, 2007

Species of moth

Pollex parabala is a moth of the family Erebidae first described by Michael Fibiger in 2007. It is known from Balabac in the Philippines.
