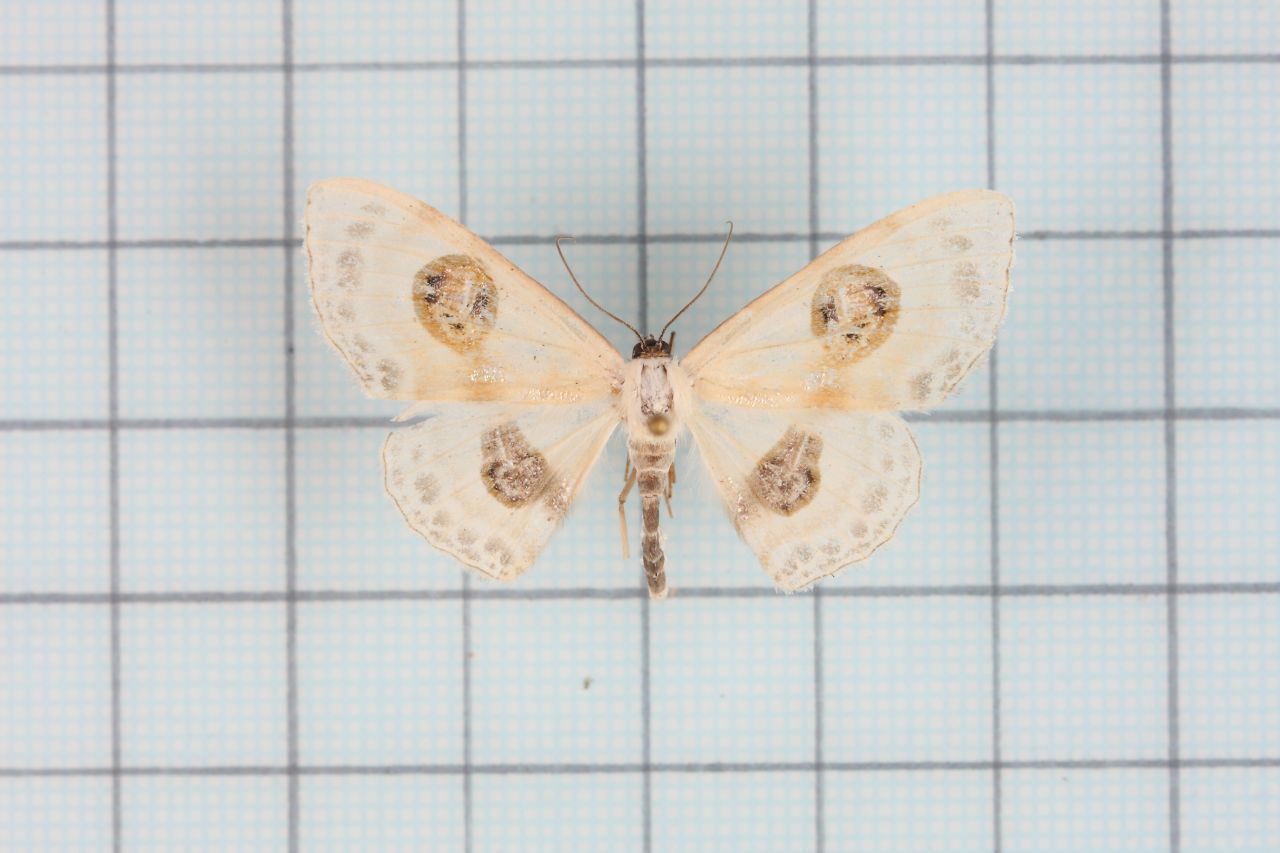

Scientific classification
- Kingdom: Animalia
- Phylum: Arthropoda
- Clade: Pancrustacea
- Class: Insecta
- Order: Lepidoptera
- Family: Geometridae
- Genus: Problepsis
- Species: P. crassinotata

Binomial name
- Problepsis crassinotata Prout, 1917

= Problepsis crassinotata =

Species of moth

Problepsis crassinotata is a species of moth of the family Geometridae. It is found in India, Thailand, China, and Taiwan.

The wingspan is 38–42 mm.
