= Bullis (surname) =

Bullis is a surname. Notable people with the surname include:

- Harry Amos Bullis (1890–1963), American businessman
- John L. Bullis (1841–1911), Union Army soldier and businessman
- Rush Bullis (1863–1946), American politician
