= Problepsis deducta =

Scientific classification
- Kingdom: Animalia
- Phylum: Arthropoda
- Clade: Pancrustacea
- Class: Insecta
- Order: Lepidoptera
- Family: Geometridae
- Genus: Problepsis
- Species: P. deducta

Binomial name
- Problepsis deducta Herbulot, 1962

Species of moth

Problepsis deducta is a moth of the family Geometridae. It is found on the Seychelles.
