= Problepsis sancta =

Scientific classification
- Kingdom: Animalia
- Phylum: Arthropoda
- Clade: Pancrustacea
- Class: Insecta
- Order: Lepidoptera
- Family: Geometridae
- Genus: Problepsis
- Species: P. sancta

Binomial name
- Problepsis sancta Meyrick, 1888

Species of moth

Problepsis sancta is a moth of the family Geometridae first described by Edward Meyrick in 1888. It is found in the Australian state of Queensland.
