= Problepsis similinotata =

Scientific classification
- Kingdom: Animalia
- Phylum: Arthropoda
- Clade: Pancrustacea
- Class: Insecta
- Order: Lepidoptera
- Family: Geometridae
- Genus: Problepsis
- Species: P. similinotata

Binomial name
- Problepsis similinotata Prout, 1917

Species of moth

Problepsis similinotata is a moth of the family Geometridae. It is found in the Democratic Republic of Congo, Guinea, Ivory Coast, Sierra Leone, Gambia and Uganda.
