= Problepsis asira =

Scientific classification
- Kingdom: Animalia
- Phylum: Arthropoda
- Clade: Pancrustacea
- Class: Insecta
- Order: Lepidoptera
- Family: Geometridae
- Genus: Problepsis
- Species: P. asira

Binomial name
- Problepsis asira Wiltshire, 1982

Species of moth

Problepsis asira is a moth of the family Geometridae. It is found in Saudi Arabia.
