= Pollex lobifera =

Scientific classification
- Kingdom: Animalia
- Phylum: Arthropoda
- Class: Insecta
- Order: Lepidoptera
- Superfamily: Noctuoidea
- Family: Erebidae
- Genus: Pollex
- Species: P. lobifera

Binomial name
- Pollex lobifera (Hampson, 1926)

Synonyms
- Tolpia lobifera Hampson, 1926

Species of moth

Pollex lobifera is a moth of the family Erebidae first described by George Hampson in 1926. It is known from Luzon in the Philippines.

The wingspan is 12–13 mm.
