= Pollex (moth) =

Scientific classification
- Domain: Eukaryota
- Kingdom: Animalia
- Phylum: Arthropoda
- Class: Insecta
- Order: Lepidoptera
- Superfamily: Noctuoidea
- Family: Erebidae
- Subtribe: Pollexina
- Genus: Pollex; Fibiger, 2007

Genus of moths

Pollex is a genus of moths of the family Erebidae erected by Michael Fibiger in 2007.

== Species ==
- Subgenus Bilobiana Fibiger, 2007
  - The flavimacula species group:
    - Pollex laosi Fibiger, 2007
    - Pollex flavimacula Fibiger, 2007
    - Pollex parunkudai Fibiger, 2007
    - Pollex diehli Fibiger, 2007
    - Pollex abovia Fibiger, 2007
    - Pollex kangeani Fibiger, 2007
    - Pollex lomboki Fibiger, 2007
    - Pollex silaui Fibiger, 2007
    - Pollex balabaci Fibiger, 2007
    - Pollex newguineai Fibiger, 2007
    - Pollex utarai Fibiger, 2007
    - Pollex sulawesii Fibiger, 2007
    - Pollex merisulawesii Fibiger, 2007
    - Pollex modus Fibiger, 2008
  - The speideli species group:
    - Pollex philippini Fibiger, 2007
    - Pollex lobifera (Hampson, 1926)
    - Pollex sapamori Fibiger, 2007
    - Pollex poguei Fibiger, 2007
    - Pollex speideli Fibiger, 2007
    - Pollex parabala Fibiger, 2007
    - Pollex mindai Fibiger, 2007
    - Pollex angustiae Fibiger, 2007
  - The schintlmeisteri species group:
    - Pollex schintlmeisteri Fibiger, 2007
  - The bulli species group:
    - Pollex oculus Fibiger, 2007
    - Pollex bulli Fibiger, 2007
    - Pollex taurus Fibiger, 2007
  - The hamus species group:
    - Pollex hamus Fibiger, 2007
    - Pollex sansdigit Fibiger, 2007
  - The spina species group:
    - Pollex flax Fibiger, 2007
    - Pollex paraspina Fibiger, 2007
    - Pollex spina Fibiger, 2007
  - The diabolo species group:
    - Pollex diabolo Fibiger, 2007
  - The spastica species group:
    - Pollex spastica Fibiger, 2007
  - The mindanaoi species group:
    - Pollex mindanaoi Fibiger, 2007
  - The dumogai species group:
    - Pollex dumogai Fibiger, 2007
  - The circulari species group:
    - Pollex kononenkoi Fibiger, 2007
    - Pollex palopoi Fibiger, 2007
    - Pollex circulari Fibiger, 2007
    - Pollex pouchi Fibiger, 2007
- Subgenus Proma Fibiger, 2007
  - The jurivetei species group:
    - Pollex lafontainei Fibiger, 2007
    - Pollex archi Fibiger, 2007
    - Pollex jurivetei Fibiger, 2007
    - Pollex serami Fibiger, 2007
  - The maxima species group:
    - Pollex maxima Fibiger, 2007
    - Pollex paramaxima Fibiger, 2007
- Subgenus Pollex Fibiger, 2007
  - Pollex crispus Fibiger, 2007
  - Pollex furca Fibiger, 2007
