= Problepsis flavistigma =

Scientific classification
- Kingdom: Animalia
- Phylum: Arthropoda
- Clade: Pancrustacea
- Class: Insecta
- Order: Lepidoptera
- Family: Geometridae
- Genus: Problepsis
- Species: P. flavistigma

Binomial name
- Problepsis flavistigma C. Swinhoe, 1904

Species of moth

Problepsis flavistigma is a moth of the family Geometridae. It is found in Kenya and Sierra Leone.

== Subspecies ==
- Problepsis flavistigma flavistigma
- Problepsis flavistigma dilatistigma L. B. Prout, 1917 (Kenya)
