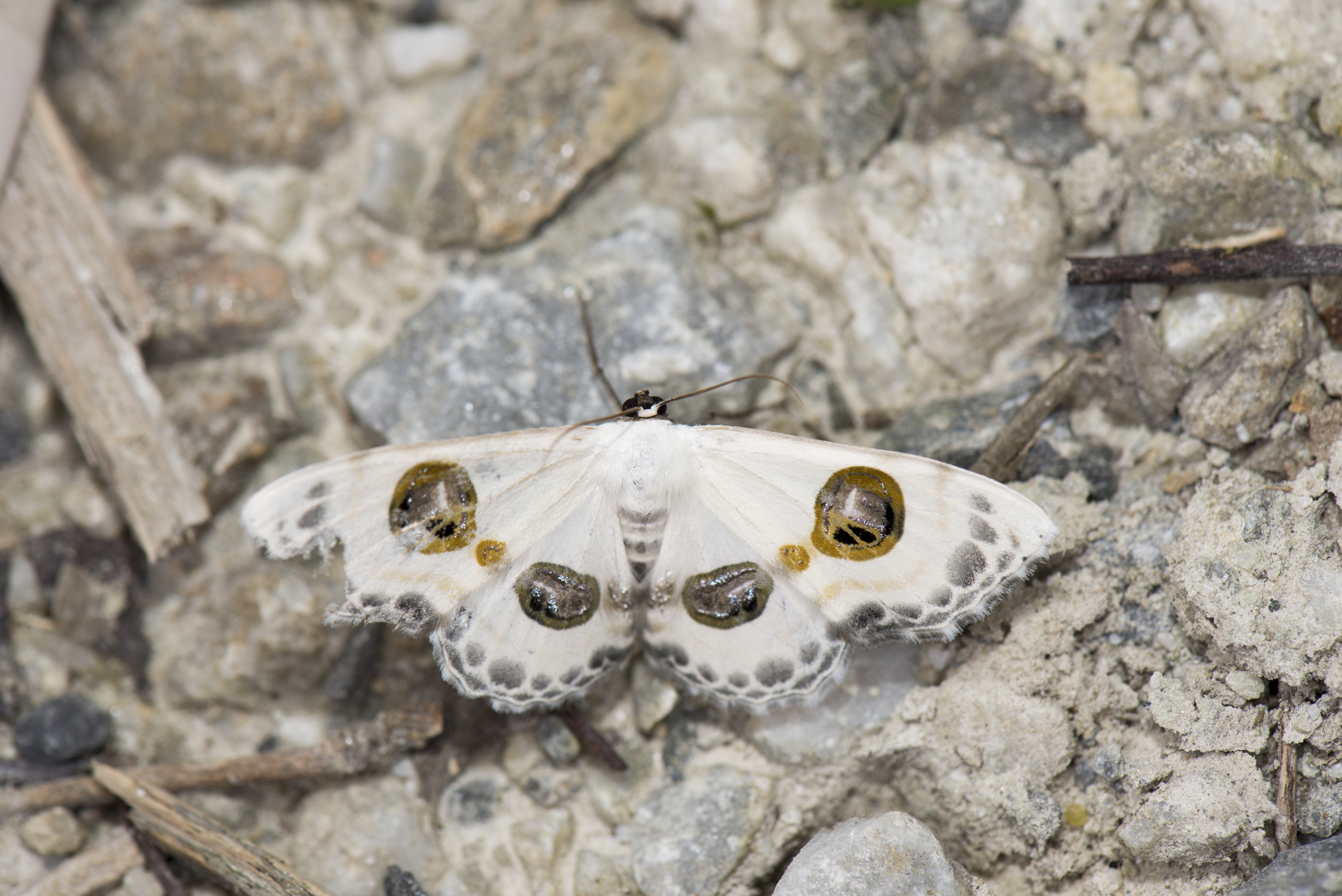

Scientific classification
- Kingdom: Animalia
- Phylum: Arthropoda
- Clade: Pancrustacea
- Class: Insecta
- Order: Lepidoptera
- Family: Geometridae
- Genus: Problepsis
- Species: P. discophora

Binomial name
- Problepsis discophora Fixsen, 1887

Synonyms
- Problepsis superans coreana Bryk, 1949

= Problepsis discophora =

Species of moth

Problepsis discophora is a moth of the family Geometridae. It is found in Korea, Taiwan and the Russian Far East.

== Subspecies ==
- Problepsis discophora discophora (Korea)
- Problepsis discophora kardakoffi Prout, 1938 (Russia: Ussuri)
