= Problepsis transposita =

Scientific classification
- Kingdom: Animalia
- Phylum: Arthropoda
- Clade: Pancrustacea
- Class: Insecta
- Order: Lepidoptera
- Family: Geometridae
- Genus: Problepsis
- Species: P. transposita

Binomial name
- Problepsis transposita Warren, 1903

Species of moth

Problepsis transposita is a moth of the family Geometridae. It is found in New Guinea and Australia.
