= Pollex modus =

Scientific classification
- Domain: Eukaryota
- Kingdom: Animalia
- Phylum: Arthropoda
- Class: Insecta
- Order: Lepidoptera
- Superfamily: Noctuoidea
- Family: Erebidae
- Genus: Pollex
- Species: P. modus

Binomial name
- Pollex modus Fibiger, 2008

Species of moth

Pollex modus is a moth of the family Erebidae first described by Michael Fibiger in 2007. It is known from Borneo.
