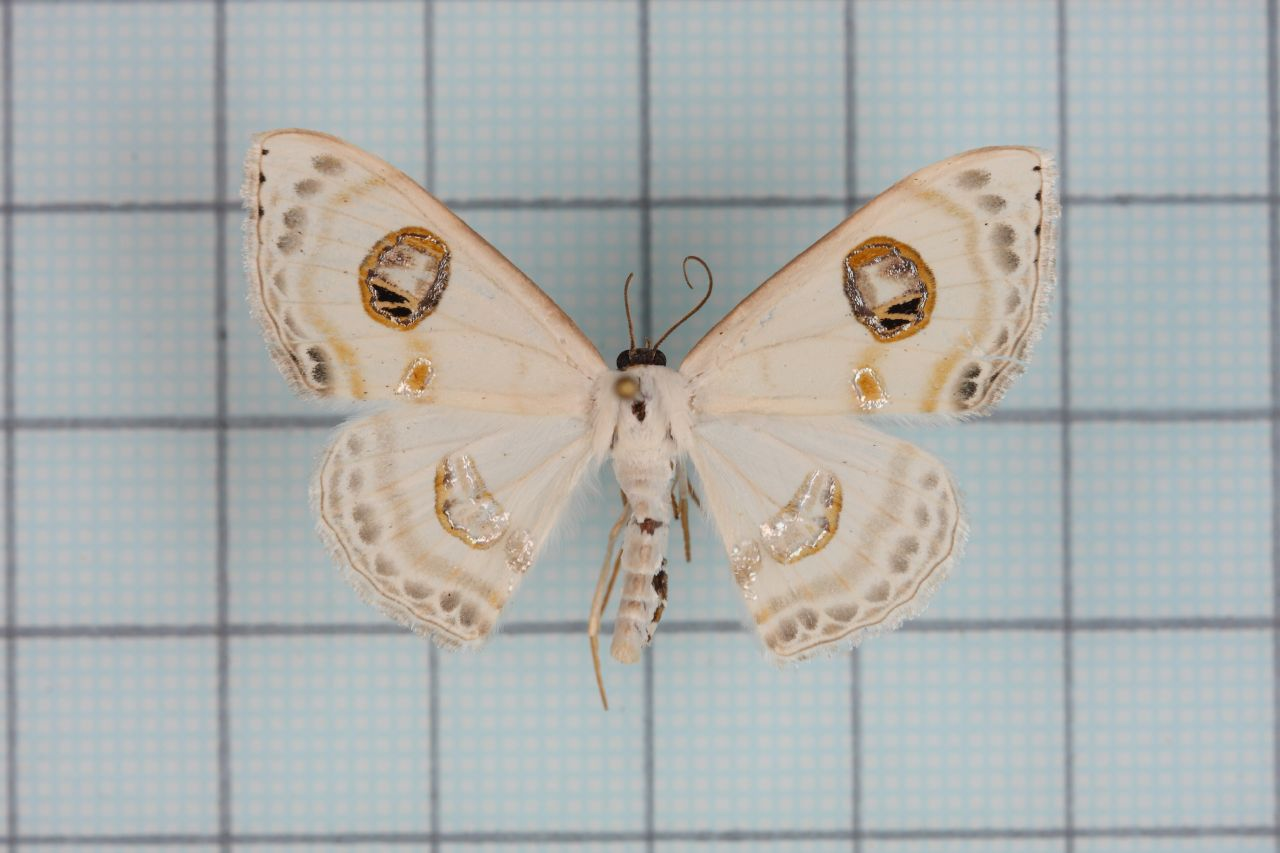
- Problepsis albidior matsumurai

Scientific classification
- Kingdom: Animalia
- Phylum: Arthropoda
- Clade: Pancrustacea
- Class: Insecta
- Order: Lepidoptera
- Family: Geometridae
- Genus: Problepsis
- Species: P. albidior

Binomial name
- Problepsis albidior Warren, 1899

= Problepsis albidior =

Species of moth

Problepsis albidior is a species of moth of the family Geometridae. It is found in Asia, including India, Taiwan and Japan.

The wingspan is 36–40 mm.

== Subspecies ==
- Problepsis albidior albidior
- Problepsis albidior matsumurai Prout 1938 (Japan, Taiwan)
