= Problepsis exanimata =

Scientific classification
- Kingdom: Animalia
- Phylum: Arthropoda
- Clade: Pancrustacea
- Class: Insecta
- Order: Lepidoptera
- Family: Geometridae
- Genus: Problepsis
- Species: P. exanimata

Binomial name
- Problepsis exanimata Prout, 1935

Species of moth

Problepsis exanimata is a moth of the family Geometridae. It is found on Java.
