= Problepsis diazoma =

Scientific classification
- Kingdom: Animalia
- Phylum: Arthropoda
- Clade: Pancrustacea
- Class: Insecta
- Order: Lepidoptera
- Family: Geometridae
- Genus: Problepsis
- Species: P. diazoma

Binomial name
- Problepsis diazoma Prout, 1938

Species of moth

Problepsis diazoma is a moth of the family Geometridae. It is found in Korea and Japan.

The wingspan is 32–41 mm.
