= Problepsis longipannis =

Scientific classification
- Kingdom: Animalia
- Phylum: Arthropoda
- Clade: Pancrustacea
- Class: Insecta
- Order: Lepidoptera
- Family: Geometridae
- Genus: Problepsis
- Species: P. longipannis

Binomial name
- Problepsis longipannis Prout, 1917

Species of moth

Problepsis longipannis is a moth of the family Geometridae. It is found in India (the Khasia Hills).
