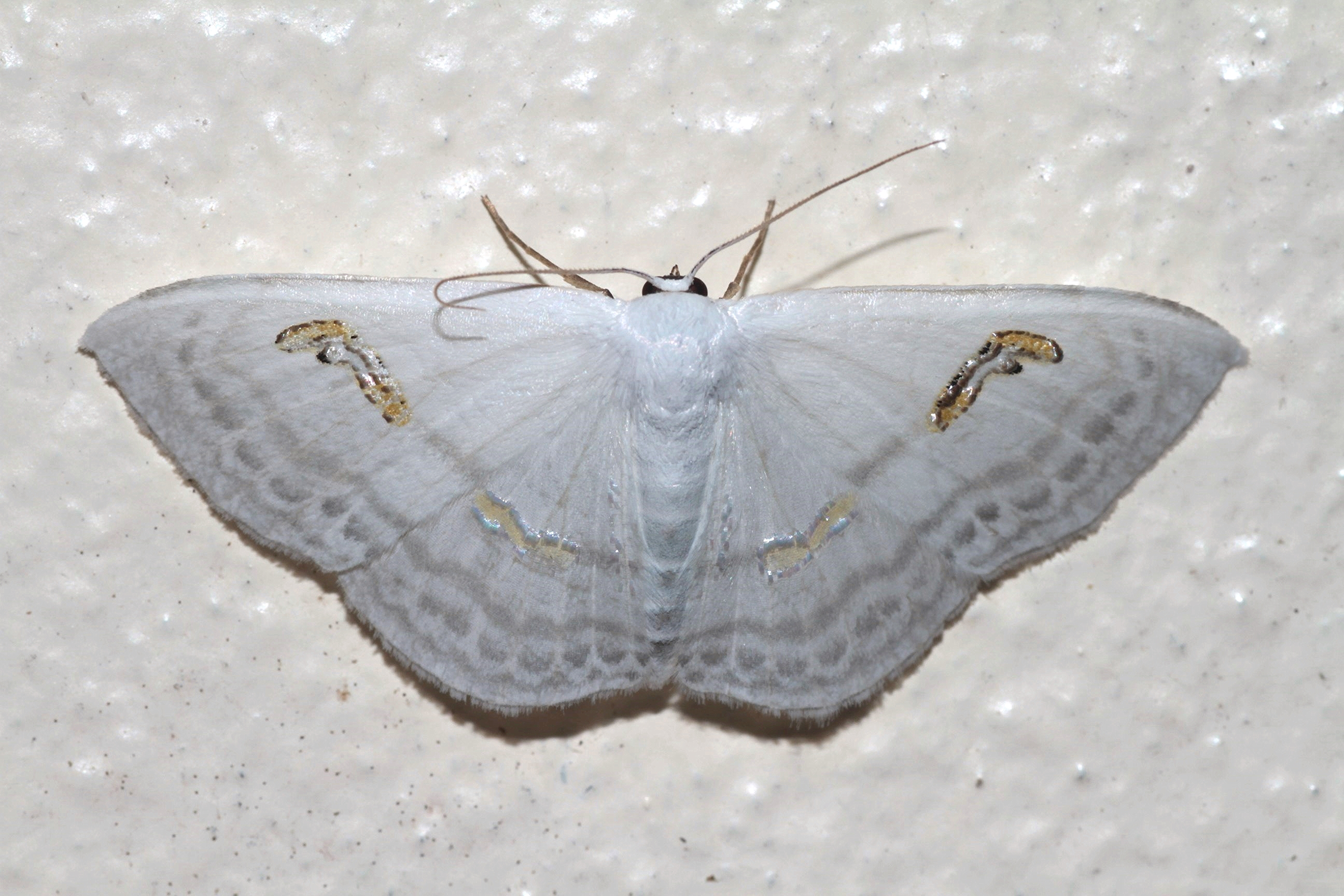

Scientific classification
- Kingdom: Animalia
- Phylum: Arthropoda
- Clade: Pancrustacea
- Class: Insecta
- Order: Lepidoptera
- Family: Geometridae
- Genus: Problepsis
- Species: P. digammata

Binomial name
- Problepsis digammata Kirby, 1896

Synonyms
- Problepsis digrammata Prout, 1933

= Problepsis digammata =

Species of moth

Problepsis digammata is a moth of the family Geometridae. It is found in Ethiopia, Kenya, Sierra Leone, South Africa, Tanzania and Uganda.
