= Problepsis centrophora =

Scientific classification
- Kingdom: Animalia
- Phylum: Arthropoda
- Clade: Pancrustacea
- Class: Insecta
- Order: Lepidoptera
- Family: Geometridae
- Genus: Problepsis
- Species: P. centrophora

Binomial name
- Problepsis centrophora (Prout, 1915)

Synonyms
- Somatina centrophora Prout, 1915

Species of moth

Problepsis centrophora is a moth of the family Geometridae. It is found in South Africa.
