= Problepsis mitis =

Scientific classification
- Kingdom: Animalia
- Phylum: Arthropoda
- Clade: Pancrustacea
- Class: Insecta
- Order: Lepidoptera
- Family: Geometridae
- Genus: Problepsis
- Species: P. mitis

Binomial name
- Problepsis mitis de Joannis, 1932

Species of moth

Problepsis mitis is a moth of the family Geometridae. It is found in Mauritius.
