= Problepsis triocellata =

Scientific classification
- Kingdom: Animalia
- Phylum: Arthropoda
- Clade: Pancrustacea
- Class: Insecta
- Order: Lepidoptera
- Family: Geometridae
- Genus: Problepsis
- Species: P. triocellata

Binomial name
- Problepsis triocellata Bastelberger, 1908

Synonyms
- Somatina triocellata (Bastelberger, 1908); Somatina scenica Prout, 1938

Species of moth

Problepsis triocellata is a moth of the family Geometridae. It is found in northern Australia and on Sulawesi.

== Subspecies ==
- Problepsis triocellata triocellata
- Problepsis triocellata scenica (Prout, 1938) (Sulawesi)
