= Problepsis metallopictata =

Scientific classification
- Kingdom: Animalia
- Phylum: Arthropoda
- Clade: Pancrustacea
- Class: Insecta
- Order: Lepidoptera
- Family: Geometridae
- Genus: Problepsis
- Species: P. metallopictata

Binomial name
- Problepsis metallopictata (Pagenstecher, 1888)

Synonyms
- Argyris metallopictata Pagenstecher, 1888; Problepsis venus Thierry-Mieg, 1905

Species of moth

Problepsis metallopictata is a moth of the family Geometridae. It is found on Ambon Island.
