= Problepsis neumanni =

Scientific classification
- Kingdom: Animalia
- Phylum: Arthropoda
- Clade: Pancrustacea
- Class: Insecta
- Order: Lepidoptera
- Family: Geometridae
- Genus: Problepsis
- Species: P. neumanni

Binomial name
- Problepsis neumanni Prout, 1932

Species of moth

Problepsis neumanni is a moth of the family Geometridae. It is found in Ethiopia.
