= Pollex lomboki =

Scientific classification
- Kingdom: Animalia
- Phylum: Arthropoda
- Clade: Pancrustacea
- Class: Insecta
- Order: Lepidoptera
- Superfamily: Noctuoidea
- Family: Erebidae
- Genus: Pollex
- Species: P. lomboki

Binomial name
- Pollex lomboki Fibiger, 2007

Species of moth

Pollex lomboki is a moth of the family Erebidae first described by Michael Fibiger in 2007. It is found on Lombok in Indonesia.
