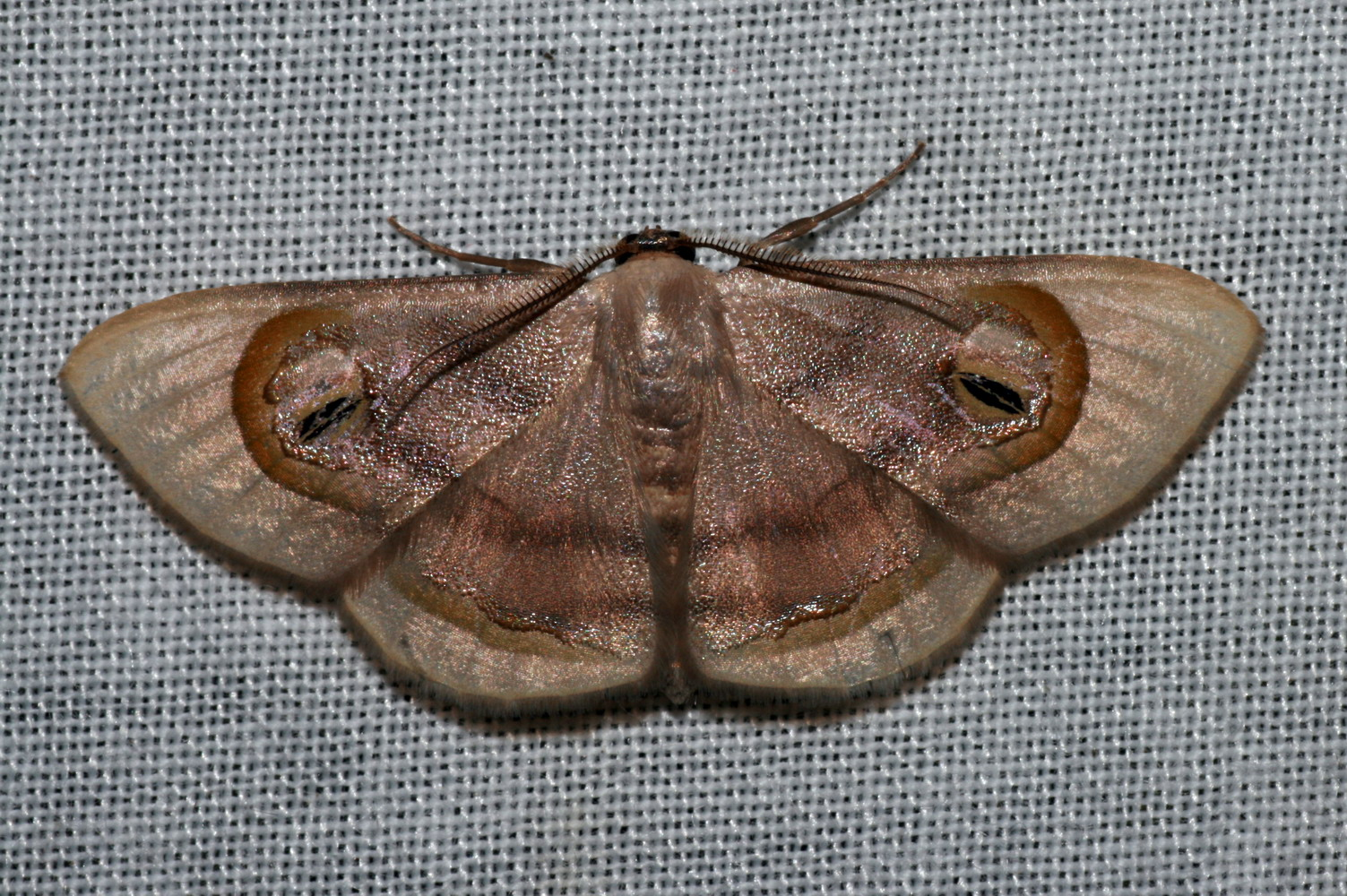
- Problepsis achlyobathra

Scientific classification
- Kingdom: Animalia
- Phylum: Arthropoda
- Class: Insecta
- Order: Lepidoptera
- Family: Geometridae
- Tribe: Scopulini
- Genus: Problepsis; Lederer, 1853

Synonyms
- Argyris Guenée, 1858; Problepsiodes Warren, 1899; Caloptera Frivaldsky, 1845

= Problepsis =

Genus of moths

Problepsis is a genus of moths in the family Geometridae.

== Description ==
Palpi thick scaled and reaching just beyond the frons. Hindleg of male small, tibia dilated with a fold containing a tuft of long hair, where the first joint of tarsus dilated and large. Forewings with vein 3 from, or from before angle of cell. Vein 5 from somewhat above middle of discocellulars. Veins 7, 8, 9 and 10 stalked from before upper angle, and vein 11 anastomosing (fusing) slightly with them to form the areole. Hindwings from, or from before, angle of cell. Vein 5 from somewhat above middle of discocellulars and vein 6 from before upper angle.

== Selected species ==
- Problepsis achlyobathra Prout, 1928
- Problepsis aegretta Felder & Rogenhofer, 1875
- Problepsis albidior Prout, 1938
- Problepsis apollinaria (Guenée, [1858])
- Problepsis argentea Warren, 1900
- Problepsis asira Wiltshire, 1982
- Problepsis borneamagna Holloway, 1997
- Problepsis centrophora (Prout, 1915)
- Problepsis clemens Lucas, 1890
- Problepsis conjunctiva Prout, 1917
- Problepsis craspediata Warren, 1897
- Problepsis crassinotata Prout, 1917
- Problepsis deducta Herbulot, 1962
- Problepsis deliaria Guenée, [1858]
- Problepsis delphiaria Guenée, ([1858])
- Problepsis diazoma Prout, 1938
- Problepsis digammata Kirby, 1896
- Problepsis discophora Fixsen, 1887
- Problepsis erythra Wiltshire, 1982
- Problepsis eucircota Prout, 1913
- Problepsis evanida Prout, 1932
- Problepsis exanimata Prout, 1935
- Problepsis flavistigma Swinhoe, 1904
- Problepsis herbuloti Viette, 1968
- Problepsis insignita Prout, 1938
- Problepsis korinchiana Rothschild, 1920
- Problepsis latonaria Guenée, ([1858])
- Problepsis longipannis Prout, 1917
- Problepsis lucifimbria (Warren, 1902)
- Problepsis magna Warren, 1906
- Problepsis maxima Thierry-Mieg, 1905
- Problepsis meroearia Saalmüller, 1884
- Problepsis metallopictata (Pagenstecher, 1888)
- Problepsis minuta Inoue, 1958
- Problepsis mitis de Joannis, 1932
- Problepsis neumanni Prout, 1932
- Problepsis ocellata (Frivaldszky, 1845)
- Problepsis ochripicta Warren, 1901
- Problepsis paredra Prout, 1917
- Problepsis phoebearia Erschoff, 1870
- Problepsis plagiata (Butler, 1881)
- Problepsis plenorbis Prout, 1917
- Problepsis rorida Prout, 1932
- Problepsis sancta Meyrick, 1888
- Problepsis shirozui Inoue, 1986
- Problepsis similinotata Prout, 1917
- Problepsis subreferta Prout, 1935
- Problepsis superans (Bulter, 1885)
- Problepsis transposita Warren, 1903
- Problepsis triocellata Bastelberger, 1908
- Problepsis vulgaris Butler, 1889
