= Problepsis borneamagna =

Scientific classification
- Kingdom: Animalia
- Phylum: Arthropoda
- Clade: Pancrustacea
- Class: Insecta
- Order: Lepidoptera
- Family: Geometridae
- Genus: Problepsis
- Species: P. borneamagna

Binomial name
- Problepsis borneamagna Holloway, 1997

Species of moth

Problepsis borneamagna is a moth of the family Geometridae. It is found on Sabah and Borneo. The habitat consists of montane forests.

The wingspan is 17–19 mm.
