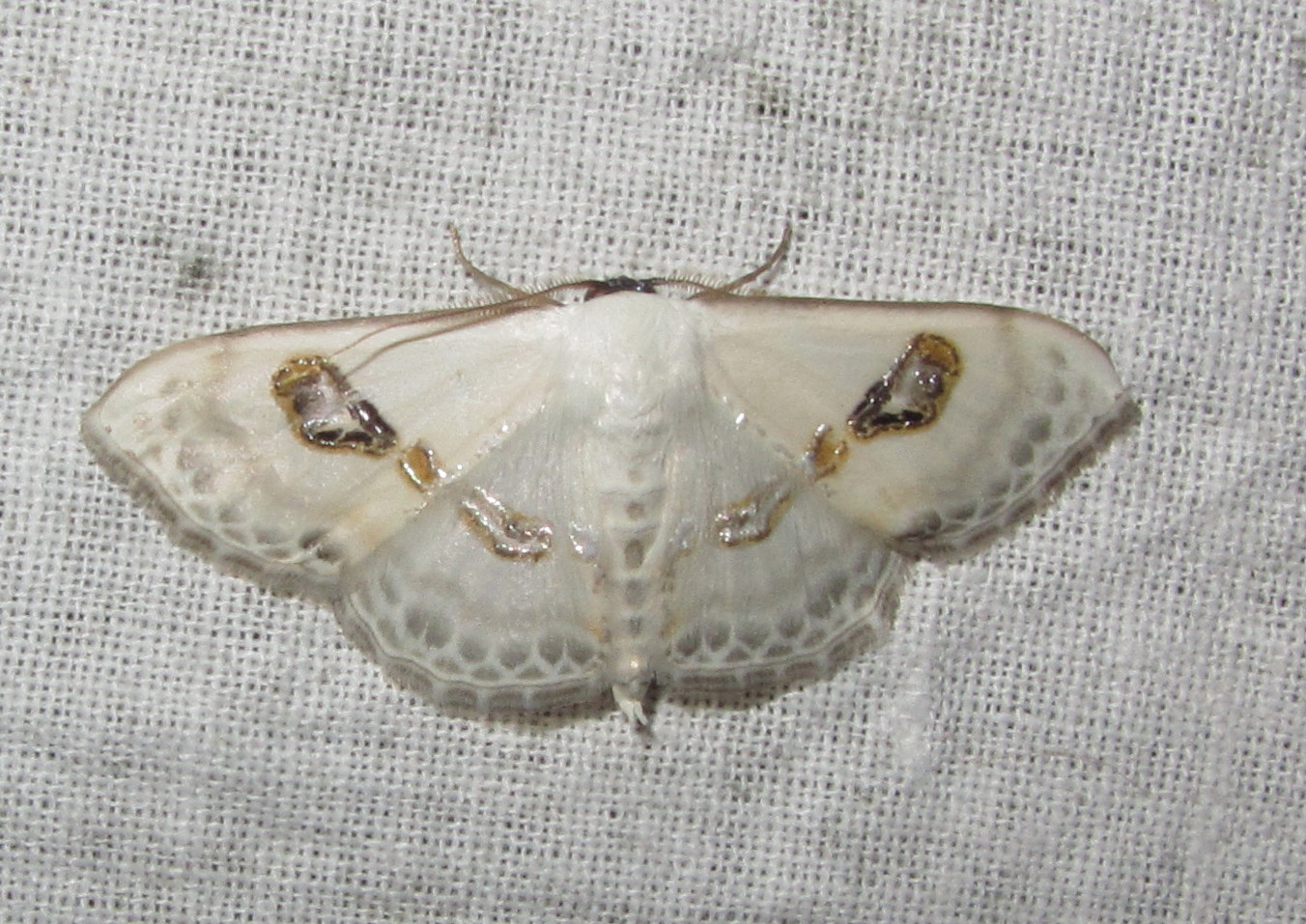

Scientific classification
- Kingdom: Animalia
- Phylum: Arthropoda
- Clade: Pancrustacea
- Class: Insecta
- Order: Lepidoptera
- Family: Geometridae
- Genus: Problepsis
- Species: P. vulgaris

Binomial name
- Problepsis vulgaris Butler, 1889

Synonyms
- Problepsis attenuata Warren, 1909

= Problepsis vulgaris =

Species of moth

Problepsis vulgaris is a moth of the family Geometridae. It is found in Asia, including India and Thailand.
