= Problepsis minuta =

Scientific classification
- Kingdom: Animalia
- Phylum: Arthropoda
- Clade: Pancrustacea
- Class: Insecta
- Order: Lepidoptera
- Family: Geometridae
- Genus: Problepsis
- Species: P. minuta

Binomial name
- Problepsis minuta Inoue, 1958

Species of moth

Problepsis minuta is a moth of the family Geometridae. It is found in Japan.
