= Problepsis latonaria =

Scientific classification
- Kingdom: Animalia
- Phylum: Arthropoda
- Clade: Pancrustacea
- Class: Insecta
- Order: Lepidoptera
- Family: Geometridae
- Genus: Problepsis
- Species: P. latonaria

Binomial name
- Problepsis latonaria (Guenée, [1858])

Synonyms
- Argyris latonaria Guenee, 1858

Species of moth

Problepsis latonaria is a moth of the family Geometridae. It is found in Malawi and South Africa.
