= Problepsis insignita =

Scientific classification
- Kingdom: Animalia
- Phylum: Arthropoda
- Clade: Pancrustacea
- Class: Insecta
- Order: Lepidoptera
- Family: Geometridae
- Genus: Problepsis
- Species: P. insignita

Binomial name
- Problepsis insignita Prout, 1938

Species of moth

Problepsis insignita is a moth of the family Geometridae. It is found on Sulawesi.
