= Problepsis craspediata =

Scientific classification
- Kingdom: Animalia
- Phylum: Arthropoda
- Clade: Pancrustacea
- Class: Insecta
- Order: Lepidoptera
- Family: Geometridae
- Genus: Problepsis
- Species: P. craspediata

Binomial name
- Problepsis craspediata Warren, 1897

Species of moth

Problepsis craspediata is a moth of the family Geometridae. It is found in New Guinea.

== Subspecies ==
- Problepsis craspediata craspediata (New Guinea)
- Problepsis craspediata frosti Prout, 1938 (Kei Islands)
- Problepsis craspediata rotifera Prout, 1916 (New Guinea)
