= Problepsis argentea =

Scientific classification
- Kingdom: Animalia
- Phylum: Arthropoda
- Clade: Pancrustacea
- Class: Insecta
- Order: Lepidoptera
- Family: Geometridae
- Genus: Problepsis
- Species: P. argentea

Binomial name
- Problepsis argentea Warren, 1900

Species of moth

Problepsis argentea is a moth of the family Geometridae. It is found on Dammer Island (the Maluku Islands).

The wingspan is about 32 mm. The forewings and hindwings are silvery white, sprinkled with fine black scales, without any markings. The underside is also white, but without any black scales.
