= Problepsis erythra =

Scientific classification
- Kingdom: Animalia
- Phylum: Arthropoda
- Clade: Pancrustacea
- Class: Insecta
- Order: Lepidoptera
- Family: Geometridae
- Genus: Problepsis
- Species: P. erythra

Binomial name
- Problepsis erythra Wiltshire, 1982

Species of moth

Problepsis erythra is a moth of the family Geometridae. It is found in Eritrea.
