= Problepsis eucircota =

Scientific classification
- Kingdom: Animalia
- Phylum: Arthropoda
- Clade: Pancrustacea
- Class: Insecta
- Order: Lepidoptera
- Family: Geometridae
- Genus: Problepsis
- Species: P. eucircota

Binomial name
- Problepsis eucircota Prout, 1913

Species of moth

Problepsis eucircota is a moth of the family Geometridae. It is found in China and Japan.
