= Problepsis delphiaria =

Scientific classification
- Kingdom: Animalia
- Phylum: Arthropoda
- Clade: Pancrustacea
- Class: Insecta
- Order: Lepidoptera
- Family: Geometridae
- Genus: Problepsis
- Species: P. delphiaria

Binomial name
- Problepsis delphiaria Guenée, ([1858])

Synonyms
- Argyris delphiaria Guenee 1858; Problepsiodes argentisquama Warren 1899

Species of insect

Problepsis delphiaria is a moth of the family Geometridae. It is found in south-east Asia, including India, Singapore, Peninsular Malaysia, Burma, Thailand, Sumatra and Borneo.

== Subspecies ==
- Problepsis delphiaria delphiaria
- Problepsis delphiaria auriculifera Warren, 1897
