= Problepsis meroearia =

Scientific classification
- Kingdom: Animalia
- Phylum: Arthropoda
- Clade: Pancrustacea
- Class: Insecta
- Order: Lepidoptera
- Family: Geometridae
- Genus: Problepsis
- Species: P. meroearia

Binomial name
- Problepsis meroearia Saalmüller, 1884

Synonyms
- Argyris mayottaria Oberthur 1923

Species of moth

Problepsis meroearia is a moth of the family Geometridae. It is found on Madagascar and Mayotte.

== Subspecies ==
- Problepsis meroearia meroearia (Madagascar)
- Problepsis meroearia mayottaria (Oberthür, 1923) (Mayotte)
