= Harry Amos Bullis =

American businessman (1890–1963)

Harry Amos Bullis (7 October 1890 – 28 September 1963) was an American business executive who served as president and chairman of General Mills.

He joined the company as a mill hand in 1919, and he soon became the confidant of founder James Ford Bell. He helped expand their breakfast foods (Wheaties, Cheerios) and diversified into convenience foods (Betty Crocker cake mixes) and non-food businesses.

In 1948 Bullis married Countess Maria Smorczewska, a Polish refugee.

He died of Hodgkin's disease in Minneapolis, Minnesota.
