= Problepsis maxima =

Scientific classification
- Kingdom: Animalia
- Phylum: Arthropoda
- Clade: Pancrustacea
- Class: Insecta
- Order: Lepidoptera
- Family: Geometridae
- Genus: Problepsis
- Species: P. maxima

Binomial name
- Problepsis maxima Thierry-Mieg, 1905

Species of moth

Problepsis maxima is a moth of the family Geometridae. It is found in Japan.
