= Buli language =

Buli language may refer to:

- Buli language (Ghana), a Gur language
- Buli language (Indonesia), a South Halmahera language
- Biyanda-Buli language, a Gbaya language of the Central African Republic
- a dialect of the Chadic Polci language in Nigeria
- a dialect of the Mongo-Nkundu language
