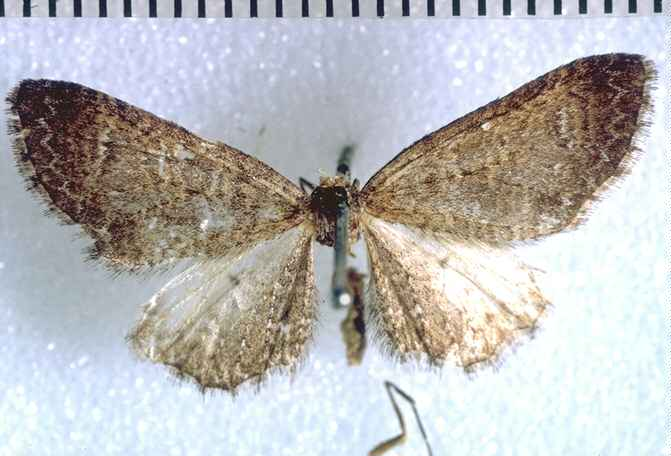
- Male holotype

Scientific classification
- Kingdom: Animalia
- Phylum: Arthropoda
- Class: Insecta
- Order: Lepidoptera
- Family: Geometridae
- Genus: Pasiphila
- Species: P. acompsa

Binomial name
- Pasiphila acompsa (Prout, 1927)

Synonyms
- Chloroclystis acompsa Prout, 1927; Chloroclystis modesta Philpott, 1915 (preocc.)

= Pasiphila acompsa =

Species of moth endemic to New Zealand

Pasiphila acompsa is a moth in the family Geometridae. It was described by Louis Beethoven Prout in 1927. It is endemic to New Zealand and has been observed in mountainous locations in both the North and South Islands. Larvae of this species have been reared on plants within the Veronica genus. Adults are on the wing from December to February.

== Taxonomy ==
This species was first described by Alfred Philpott in 1915 and named Chloroclystis modesta. However the species name Chloroclystis acompsa was proposed by Louis Beethoven Prout as a replace name for the name given by Alfred Philpott which Prout regarded as being preoccupied by Chloroclystis modesta described by William Warren. In 1971 John S. Dugdale placed this species in the genus Pasiphila. In 1988 John S. Dugdale discussed this species under the name Pasiphila acompsa and in 2010 Robert Hoare in the New Zealand Inventory of Biodiversity followed this placement. The male holotype specimen was collected at Bold Peak in the Otago by Charles Cuthbert Fenwick and is now held at Te Papa.

== Description ==
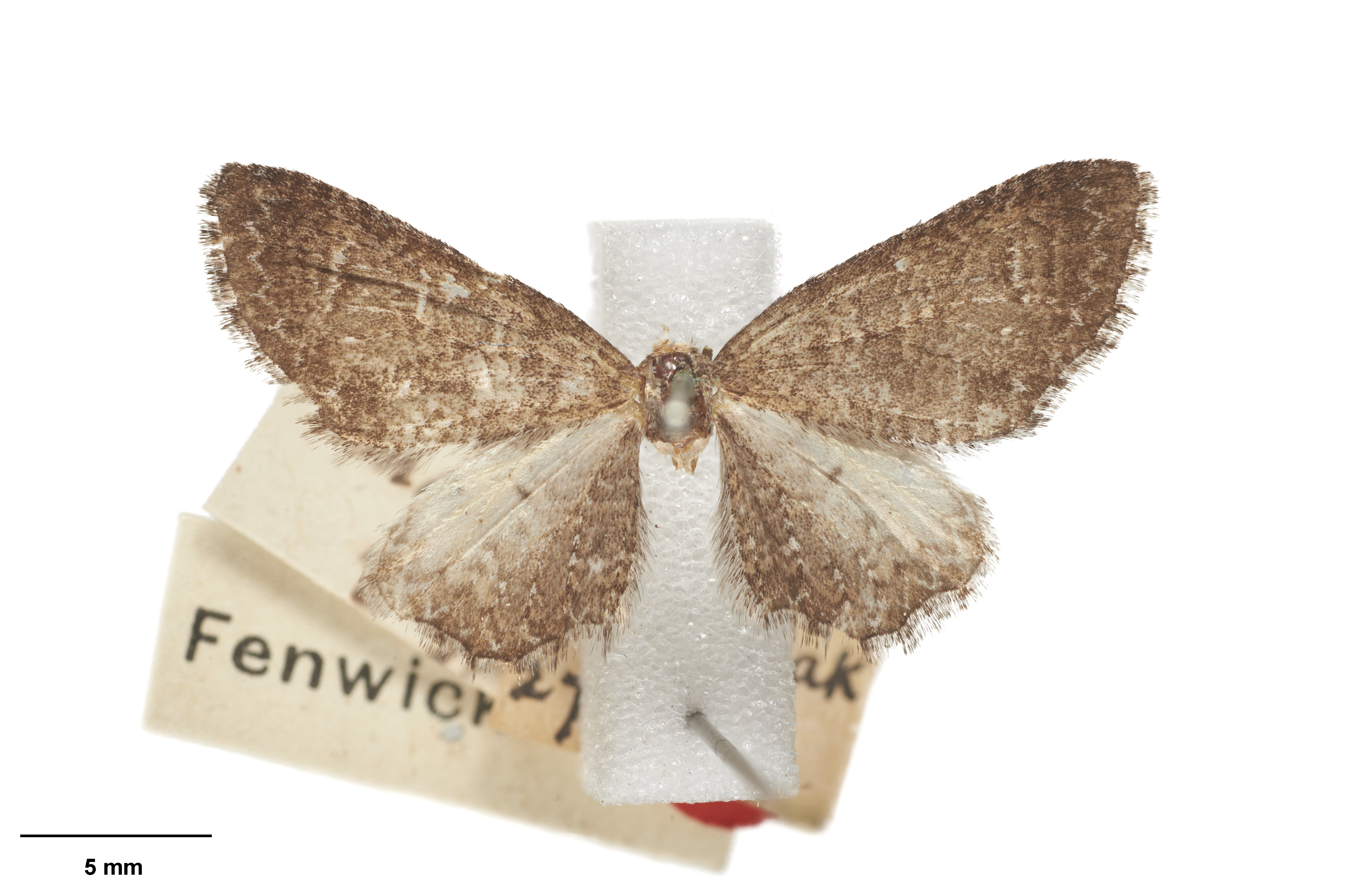
Holotype specimen of Chloroslystis modesta now known as Pasiphila acompsa.

Philpott's description of this species is as follows:

♂♀ 26–29 mm. Head, thorax, and abdomen dark brownish-fuscous, sparsely mixed with grey. Palpi reddish-tinged, 2 1/2. Antennae in ♂ ciliate-fasciculate, ciliations 4 1/2. Forewings rather narrow, costa subsinuate, slightly arched, termen sinuate on lower half, moderately oblique; fuscous-brown; markings obscure, grey-whitish; veins interruptedly marked with blackish; many irregularly serrate or waved transverse striae; a more distinct pair at 1/3, and 3 or 4 similar ones defining outer edge of median band at 2/3; an obscure blackish discal dot; a faintly greenish-tinged serrate subterminal line: cilia fuscous with paler median line, sometimes indistinctly barred with darker. Hindwings, termen irregularly rounded, prominent at veins 3 and 4; fuscous-grey, darker dorsally; a dark discal dot; some lighter striae obscurely indicated on dorsum: cilia as in forewings. Differs from Chloroclystis halianthes Meyr. in the irregular termen of the hindwings. It is also much darker in colour, and the cilia are not distinctly barred.

This species is similar in appearance to Pasiphila dryas but it lacks the pink-brown shade of the latter species.

== Distribution ==
This species is endemic to New Zealand and has been observed on Mount Taranaki and Mount Ruapehu in the North Island and on Ben Lomond, Bold Peak and around Lake Wakatipu, all in Otago in the South Island. P. acompsa has been observed at altitudes of between 3,000 and 4,000 feet.

== Behaviour ==
Adults of this species are on the wing from December to February.

== Hosts ==
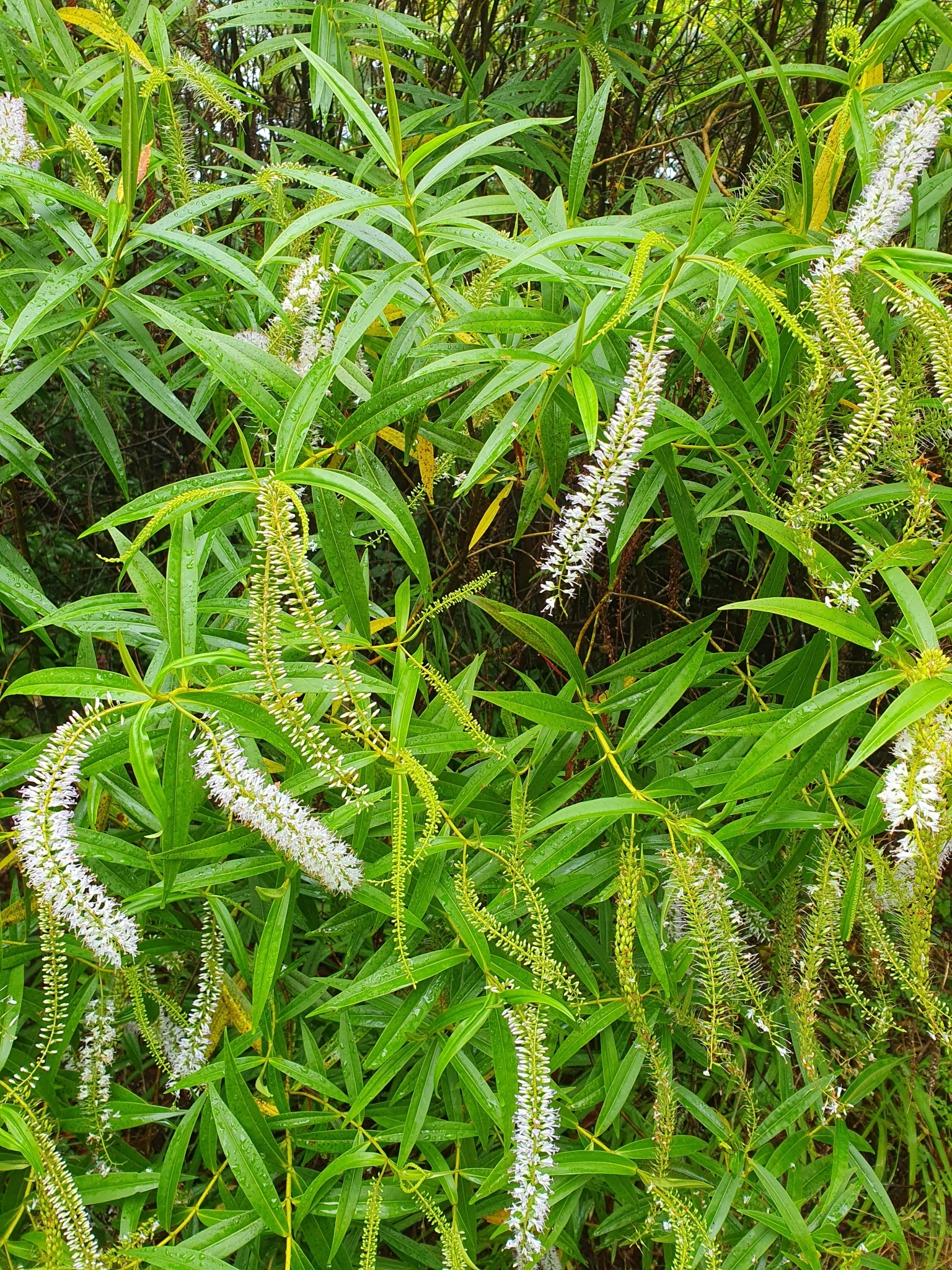
Larval host Veronica stricta

Larvae of this species have been reared on plants within the Veronica genus.
