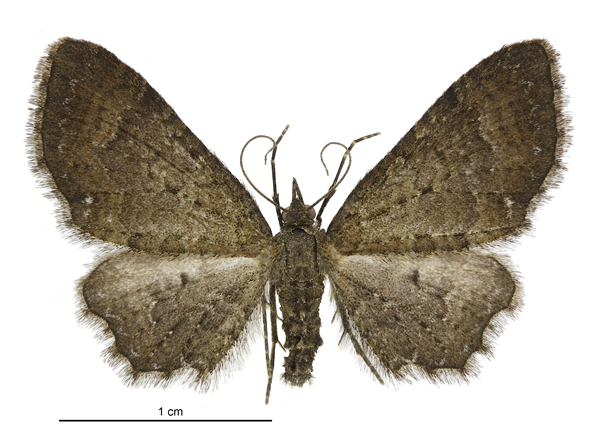
- Female specimen
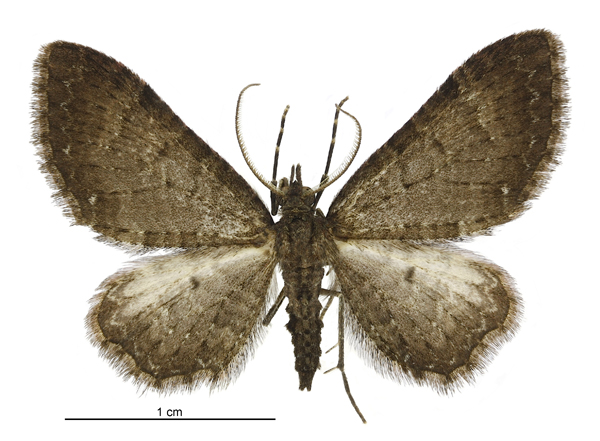
- Male specimen

Scientific classification
- Kingdom: Animalia
- Phylum: Arthropoda
- Clade: Pancrustacea
- Class: Insecta
- Order: Lepidoptera
- Family: Geometridae
- Genus: Pasiphila
- Species: P. dryas

Binomial name
- Pasiphila dryas Meyrick, 1891

Synonyms
- Chloroclystis dryas (Meyrick, 1891)

= Pasiphila dryas =

Species of moth endemic to New Zealand

Pasiphila dryas is a moth of the family Geometridae. It was first described by Edward Meyrick in 1891. This species is endemic to New Zealand and has been observed in the southern half of the North Island and throughout the South Island. The larval host plant for this species is Veronica salicifolia. Adults are most commonly on the wing from November until May and may occasionally be observed during New Zealand's winter months. The adult moth is attracted to light.

== Taxonomy ==
This species was first described by Edward Meyrick in 1891 using a specimen collected by George Hudson in Wellington and named Pasiphila dryas. Hudson discussed this in both his 1898 and 1924 books under the name Chloroclystis dryas. In 1988 John S. Dugdale confirmed the placement of this species in the genus Pasiphila. The male holotype specimen is held at the Natural History Museum, London.

== Description ==
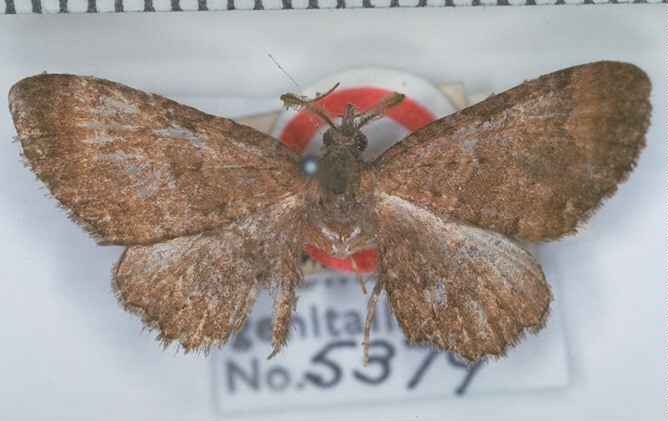
Male holotype specimen of Pasiphila dryas

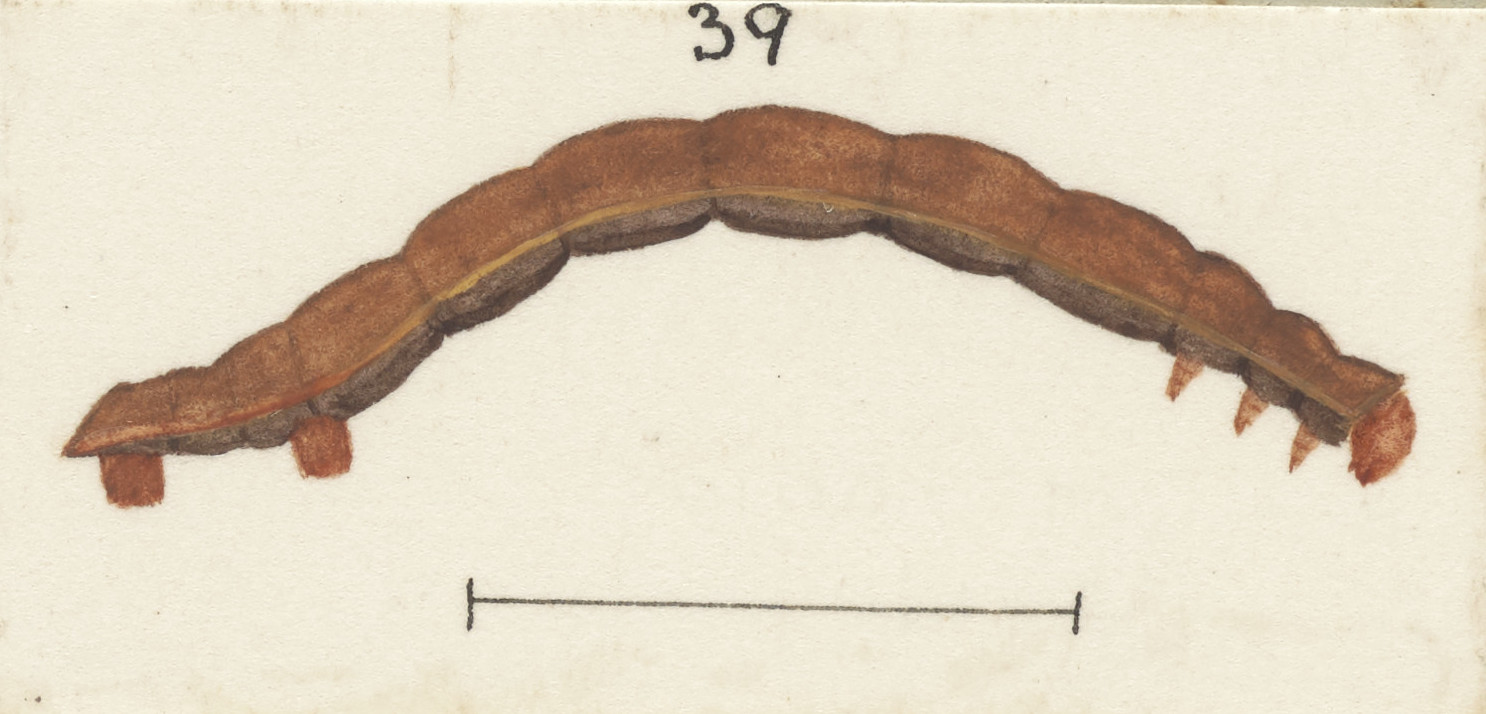
Illustration of larva.

Meyrick described the adult male of this species as follows:

♂. 25mm. Head, palpi, thorax, and abdomen light reddish-brown irrorated with blackish; palpi 2 1/2. Antennas light fuscous, ciliated with long fascicles (4). Legs dark fuscous, apex of joints whitish. Fore wings with hindmargin bowed, oblique, crenulate, slightly sinuate above anal angle; rather light reddish-brown; numerous curved waved cloudy dark fuscous transverse lines, somewhat marked with black on veins; anterior edge of median band from 3/8 of costa to 2/5 of inner margin, shortly angulated near costa; posterior edge from before 3/4 of costa to 3/4 of inner margin, forming a broadly-triangular projection in middle; a faint pale waved subterminal line, forming a whitish dot above anal angle : cilia pale brownish, irrorated with dark fuscous. Hindwings with hindmargin unevenly rounded, crenulate, sinuate above middle and above anal angle; light reddish-brown, irrorated with dark luscous, forming obscure waved transverse lines; a blackish hindmarginal line; cilia as in forewings.

Hudson described the larva of this species as follows:

The larva ... is about 3/4 inch in length, much flattened with prominent lateral ridges; the head and segments 2, 3, and 4 are small, and the posterior segments are slightly attenuated; the general colour is dark reddish-brown tinged with purple on the ventral surface; there is an obscure yellowish lateral line and darker dorsal line. The head, legs and prolegs are bright orange-brown.

Hudson also describes the pupa as being enclosed in a very light cocoon of silk and refuse. Hudson pointed out that the adults of this species are very similar in appearance to what is now known as Pasiphila acompsa but that this latter species lacks the pink-brown shade of P. dryas.

== Distribution ==
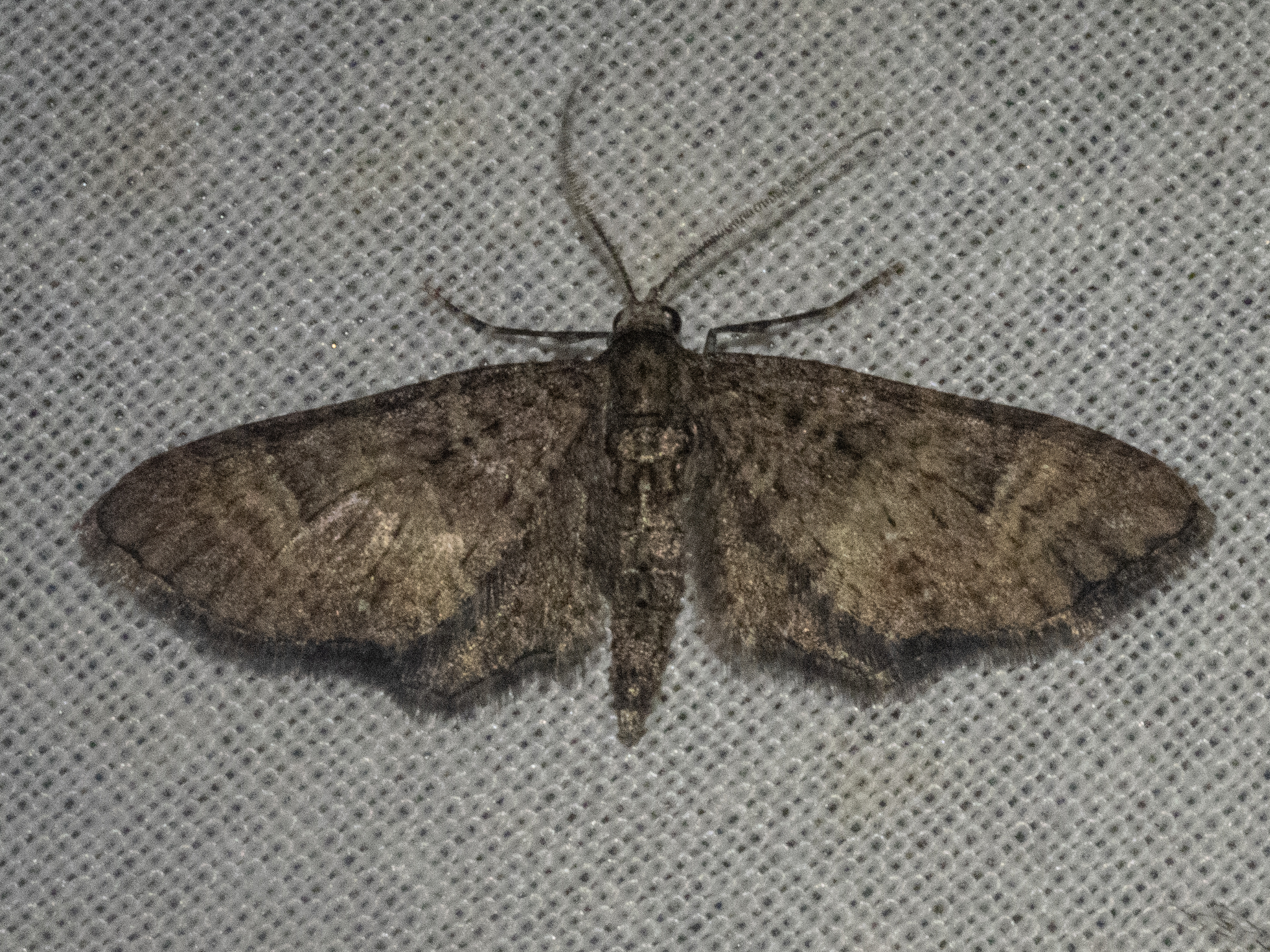
Living specimen of P. dryas.

This species is endemic to New Zealand. This species has been observed in the southern half of the North Island and throughout the South Island.

== Habitat and hosts ==
The larval host plant for this species is Veronica salicifolia with larvae feeding on both the blossoms and the leaves of this plant.

== Behaviour ==
The larva rest by clinging firmly to its host plant, and rigidly extends its body thus imitating a twig. This species pupates on the ground underneath its host plant. Adults are most commonly on wing from November until May but are occasionally observed in New Zealand's winter months. Adults are attracted to light.
