= List of moths of Russia (Geometroidea-Bombycoidea) =

This is a list of the Russian moth species of the superfamilies Geometroidea and Bombycoidea. It also acts as an index to the species articles and forms part of the full List of moths of Russia.

== Geometroidea ==
=== Uraniidae ===
- Acropteris iphiata (Guenée, 1857)
- Dysaethria cretacea (Butler, 1881)
- Dysaethria erasaria (Christoph, 1881)
- Dysaethria illotata (Christoph, 1881)
- Dysaethria moza (Butler, 1878)
- Eversmannia exornata (Eversmann, 1837)
- Oroplema plagifera (Butler, 1881)

=== Geometridae ===
- Abraxas fulvobasalis Warren, 1894
- Abraxas grossulariata (Linnaeus, 1758)
- Abraxas karafutonis Matsumura, 1925
- Abraxas latifasciata Warren, 1894
- Abraxas niphonibia Wehrli, 1935
- Abraxas pantaria (Linnaeus, 1767)
- Abraxas sylvata (Scopoli, 1763)
- Acasis appensata (Eversmann, 1842)
- Acasis viretata (Hübner, [1799])
- Acrodontis kotshubjei Sheljuzhko, 1944
- Aethalura ignobilis (Butler, 1878)
- Aethalura nanaria (Staudinger, 1897)
- Aethalura punctulata ([Denis & Schiffermüller], 1775)
- Agaraeus parva (Hedemann, 1881)
- Agathia carissima Butler, 1878
- Agriopis aurantiaria (Hübner, [1799])
- Agriopis bajaria ([Denis & Schiffermüller], 1775)
- Agriopis declinans (Staudinger, 1879)
- Agriopis dira (Butler, 1878)
- Agriopis leucophaearia ([Denis & Schiffermüller], 1775)
- Agriopis marginaria (Fabricius, [1776])
- Alcis castigataria (Bremer, 1864)
- Alcis deversata (Staudinger, 1892)
- Alcis extinctaria (Eversmann, 1851)
- Alcis jubata (Thunberg, 1788)
- Alcis medialbifera Inoue, 1972
- Alcis picata (Butler, 1881)
- Alcis pryeraria (Leech, 1897)
- Alcis repandata (Linnaeus, 1758)
- Aleucis distinctata (Herrich-Schäffer, [1839])
- Alsophila aceraria ([Denis & Schiffermüller], 1775)
- Alsophila aescularia ([Denis & Schiffermüller], 1775)
- Alsophila bulawski Beljaev, 1996
- Alsophila japonensis (Warren, 1894)
- Alsophila murinaria Beljaev, 1996
- Alsophila vladimiri Viidalepp, 1986
- Alsophila zabolne Inoue, 1941
- Alsophiloides kurentzovi Viidalepp, 1986
- Amorphogynia necessaria (Zeller, 1849)
- Amraica superans (Butler, 1878)
- Angerona prunaria (Linnaeus, 1758)
- Anticlea derivata ([Denis & Schiffermüller], 1775)
- Anticollix sparsata (Treitschke, 1828)
- Anticypella diffusaria (Leech, 1897)
- Aoshakuna lucia (Thierry-Mieg, 1916)
- Apeira syringaria (Linnaeus, 1758)
- Aplasta ononaria (Fuessly, 1783)
- Aplocera annexata (Freyer, 1830)
- Aplocera columbata (Metzner, 1845)
- Aplocera efformata (Guenée, [1858])
- Aplocera numidaria (Herrich-Schäffer, 1852)
- Aplocera perelegans (Warren, 1894)
- Aplocera plagiata (Linnaeus, 1758)
- Aplocera praeformata (Hübner, [1826])
- Aplocera roddi Vasilenko, 1995
- Aplocera uniformata (Urbahn, 1971)
- Apoaspilates tristrigaria (Bremer & Grey, 1853)
- Apocheima cinerarius (Erschoff, 1874)
- Apocheima hispidaria ([Denis & Schiffermüller], 1775)
- Apochima flabellaria (Heeger, 1838)
- Apochima juglansiaria (Graeser, 1889)
- Apocolotois arnoldiaria (Oberthür, 1912)
- Aporhoptrina semiorbiculata (Christoph, 1881)
- Aracima muscosa Butler, 1878
- Arbognophos amoenaria (Staudinger, 1897)
- Archiearis notha (Hübner, [1803])
- Archiearis parthenias (Linnaeus, 1761)
- Arichanna albomacularia Leech, 1891
- Arichanna flavomacularia Leech, 1897
- Arichanna melanaria (Ltnnaeus, 1758)
- Arichanna tetrica (Butler, 1878)
- Artiora evonymaria ([Denis & Schiffermüller], 1775)
- Ascotis selenaria ([Denis & Schiffermüller], 1775)
- Asovia maeoticaria (Alphéraky, 1876)
- Aspilobapta sylvicola Djakonov, 1952
- Aspitates acuminaria (Eversmann, 1851)
- Aspitates gilvaria ([Denis & Schiffermüller], 1775)
- Astegania honesta (Prout, 1908)
- Asthena albulata (Hufnagel, 1767)
- Asthena amurensis (Staudinger, 1897)
- Asthena anseraria (Herrich-Schäffer, 1855)
- Asthena corculina Butler, 1878
- Asthena nymphaeata (Staudinger, 1897)
- Asthena ochrifasciaria Leech, 1897
- Asthena ojrotica Vasilenko, 1998
- Asthena percandidata (Christoph, 1893)
- Asthena sachaliensis (Matsumura, 1925)
- Autotrichia heterogynoides (Wehrli, 1927)
- Autotrichia karanguica Vasilenko, [2003]
- Autotrichia lysimeles (Prout, 1924)
- Autotrichia pellucida (Staudinger, 1890)
- Baptria hiroobi Inoue, 1954
- Baptria tibiale (Esper, 1804)
- Biston achyra Wehrli, 1936
- Biston betularia (Linnaeus, 1758)
- Biston hypoleucos Kusnezov, 1901
- Biston regalis (Moore, 1888)
- Biston robustum Butler, 1879
- Biston strataria (Hufnagel, 1767)
- Biston thoracicaria (Oberthür, 1884)
- Brabira artemidora (Oberthür, 1884)
- Bupalus piniaria (Linnaeus, 1758)
- Bupalus vestalis Staudinger, 1897
- Cabera exanthemata (Scopoli, 1763)
- Cabera griseolimbata (Oberthür, 1879)
- Cabera leptographa Wehrli, 1936
- Cabera purus (Butler, 1878)
- Cabera pusaria (Linnaeus, 1758)
- Cabera schaefferi Bremer, 1864
- Calcaritis pallida Hedemann, 1881
- Calicha nooraria (Bremer, 1864)
- Calicha ornataria (Leech, 1891)
- Callabraxas fabiolaria (Oberthür, 1884)
- Callabraxas ludovicaria (Oberthür, 1880)
- Callabraxas whitelyi (Butler, 1878)
- Campaea honoraria ([Denis & Schiffermüller], 1775)
- Campaea margaritaria (Linnaeus, 1761)
- Camptogramma bilineata (Linnaeus, 1758)
- Carige duplicaria Walker, [1863]
- Carsia lythoxylata (Hübner, [1799])
- Carsia sororiata (Hübner, [1813])
- Casilda antophillaria (Hübner, [1813])
- Cataclysme riguata (Hübner, [1813])
- Catarhoe cuculata (Hufnagel, 1767)
- Catarhoe putridaria (Herrich-Schäffer, 1852)
- Catarhoe rubidata ([Denis & Schiffermüller], 1775)
- Catarhoe yokohamae (Butler, 1881)
- Cepphis advenaria (Hübner, 1790)
- Chariaspilates formosaria (Eversmann, 1837)
- Charissa certhiatus (Rebel & Zerny, [1931])
- Charissa obscurata ([Denis & Schiffermüller], 1775)
- Charissa pallescens (Rjabov, 1964)
- Charissa talyshensis (Wehrli, 1936)
- Charissa zejae (Wehrli, 1953)
- Chelegnophos ravistriolaria (Wehrli, 1922)
- Chesias legatella ([Denis & Schiffermüller], 1775)
- Chesias rufata (Fabricius, 1775)
- Chiasmia aestimaria (Hübner, [1809])
- Chiasmia clathrata (Linnaeus, 1758)
- Chiasmia pluviata (Fabricius, 1798)
- Chiasmia saburraria (Eversmann, 1851)
- Chlorissa amphitritaria (Oberthür, 1879)
- Chlorissa anadema (Prout, 1930)
- Chlorissa cloraria (Hübner, [1813])
- Chlorissa inornata (Matsumura, 1925)
- Chlorissa obliterata (Walker, [1863])
- Chlorissa viridata (Linnaeus, 1758)
- Chloroclysta miata (Linnaeus, 1758)
- Chloroclysta siterata (Hufnagel, 1767)
- Chloroclystis v-ata (Haworth, 1809)
- Chrysoctenis filacearia (Herrich-Schäffer, 1847)
- Cidaria distinctata Staudinger, 1892
- Cidaria fulvata (Forster, 1771)
- Cidaria luteata Choi, 1998
- Cinglis humifusaria (Eversmann, 1837)
- Cleora cinctaria ([Denis & Schiffermüller], 1775)
- Cleora insolita (Butler, 1878)
- Cleora leucophaea (Butler, 1878)
- Cleorodes lichenaria (Hufnagel, 1767)
- Cleta jacutica Viidalepp, 1976
- Cleta perpusillaria (Eversmann, 1847)
- Cnestrognophos annubilata (Christoph, 1885)
- Coenocalpe lapidata (Hübner, [1809])
- Colostygia aptata (Hübner, [1813])
- Colostygia olivata ([Denis & Schiffermüller], 1775)
- Colostygia pectinataria (Knoch, 1781)
- Colostygia turbata (Hübner, [1799])
- Colotois pennaria (Linnaeus, 1761)
- Comibaena amoenaria (Oberthür, 1880)
- Comibaena bajularia ([Denis & Schiffermüller], 1775)
- Comibaena delicator (Warren, 1897)
- Comibaena ingrata (Wileman, 1911)
- Comibaena tancrei (Graeser, 1890)
- Comibaena tenuisaria (Graeser, 1889)
- Comostola subtiliaria (Bremer, 1864)
- Cosmorhoe ocellata (Linnaeus, 1758)
- Costaconvexa caespitaria (Christoph, 1881)
- Costaconvexa polygrammata (Borkhausen, 1794)
- Crocallis elinguaria (Linnaeus, 1758)
- Crocallis inexpectata Warnecke, 1940
- Crocallis tusciaria (Borkhausen, 1793)
- Crypsicometa incertaria (Leech, 1891)
- Cryptochorina amphidasyaria (Oberthür, 1880)
- Ctenognophos burmesteri (Graeser, 1889)
- Ctenognophos grandinaria (Motschulsky, [1861])
- Ctenognophos tetarte Wehrli, 1931
- Culpinia diffusa (Walker, 1861)
- Cusiala stipitaria (Oberthür, 1880)
- Cyclophora albiocellaria (Hilbner, 1789)
- Cyclophora albipunctata (Hufnagel, 1767)
- Cyclophora annularia (Fabricius, 1775)
- Cyclophora linearia (Hübner, [1799])
- Cyclophora pendularia (Clerck, 1759)
- Cyclophora porata (Linnaeus, 1767)
- Cyclophora punctaria (Linnaeus, 1758)
- Cyclophora puppillaria (Hübner, [1799])
- Cyclophora quercimontaria (Bastelberger, 1897)
- Cyclophora suppunctaria (Zeller, 1847)
- Cystidia couaggaria Guenée, [1858]
- Cystidia stratonice (Stoll, 1782)
- Cystidia truncangulata Wehrli, 1934
- Deileptenia mandschuriaria (Bremer, 1864)
- Deileptenia ribeata (Clerck, 1759)
- Descoreba simplex Butler, 1878
- Devenilia corearia (Leech, 1891)
- Diaprepesilla flavomarginaria (Bremer, 1864)
- Dicrognophos sartata (Treitschke, 1827)
- Digrammia rippertaria (Duponchel, 1830)
- Dithecodes erasa Warren, 1900
- Dyschloropsis impararia (Guenée, [1858])
- Dyscia conspersaria ([Denis & Schiffermüller], 1775)
- Dyscia fagaria (Thunberg, 1784)
- Dyscia innocentaria (Christoph, 1885)
- Dysgnophos macgufftni Smiles, 1979
- Dysgnophos sibiriata (Guenée, [1858])
- Dysgnophos subsplendidaria (Wehrli, 1922)
- Dysgnophos turfosaria (Wehrli, 1922)
- Dysgnophos urmensis (Wehrli, 1953)
- Dysstroma cinereata (Moore, 1867)
- Dysstroma citrata (Linnaeus, 1761)
- Dysstroma infuscata (Tengstrom, 1869)
- Dysstroma korbi (Heydemann, 1929)
- Dysstroma latefasciata (Staudinger, 1892)
- Dysstroma pseudimmanata (Heydemann, 1929)
- Dysstroma truncata (Hufnagel, 1767)
- Earophila badiata ([Denis & Schiffermüller], 1775)
- Earophila kolomietsi Vasilenko, 2003
- Echthrocollix minuta (Butler, 1881)
- Ecliptopera capitata (Herrich-Schäffer, [1839])
- Ecliptopera pryeri (Butler, 1881)
- Ecliptopera silaceata ([Denis & Schiffermüller], 1775)
- Ecliptopera umbrosaria (Motschulsky, [1861])
- Ectephrina semilutata (Lederer, 1853)
- Ectropis aigneri Prout, 1930
- Ectropis crepuscularia ([Denis & Schiffermüller], 1775)
- Ectropis excellens (Butler, 1884)
- Ectropis obliqua (Prout, 1915)
- Eilicrinia cordiaria (Hübner, 1790)
- Eilicrinia nuptaria Bremer, 1864
- Eilicrinia subcordaria (Herrich-Schäffer, 1852)
- Eilicrinia trinotata (Metzner, 1845)
- Eilicrinia unimacularia Pungeler, 1914
- Eilicrinia wehrliii Djakonov, 1933
- Electrophaes corylata (Thunberg, 1792)
- Electrophaes recens Inoue, 1982
- Elophos dilucidaria ([Denis & Schiffermüller], 1775)
- Elophos dognini (Thierry-Mieg, 1910)
- Elophos vittaria (Thunberg, 1788)
- Ematurga atomaria (Linnaeus, 1758)
- Endropiodes indictinaria (Bremer, 1864)
- Ennomos alniaria (Linnaeus, 1758)
- Ennomos autumnaria (Werneburg, 1859)
- Ennomos effractaria Freyer, 1841
- Ennomos erosaria ([Denis & Schiffermüller], 1775)
- Ennomos fuscantaria (Haworth, 1809)
- Ennomos infidelis (Prout, 1929)
- Ennomos nephotropa Prout, 1930
- Ennomos quercaria (Hübner, [1813])
- Ennomos quercinaria (Hufnagel, 1767)
- Entephria amplicosta Inoue, 1955
- Entephria beringiana Troubridge, 1997
- Entephria caesiata ([Denis & Schiffermüller], 1775)
- Entephria calcephila Tikhonov, 1994
- Entephria cyanata (Hübner, [1809])
- Entephria flavicinctata (Hübner, [1813])
- Entephria ignorata (Staudinger, 1892)
- Entephria kidluitata (Munroe, 1951)
- Entephria kodara Vasilenko, 2002
- Entephria muscosaria (Christoph, 1893)
- Entephria nobiliaria (Herrich-Schäffer, 1852)
- Entephria occata (Piingeler, 1904)
- Entephria olgae Vasilenko, 1990
- Entephria polata (Duponchel, 1830)
- Entephria punctipes (Curtis, 1835)
- Entephria ravaria (Lederer, 1853)
- Entephria sachaensis Vasilenko, 1988
- Entephria tjemurovi Tikhonov, 1994
- Entephria transsibirica Vasilenko, 1990
- Entephria tzygankovi Wehrli, 1929
- Entephria zolotarenkoi Vasilenko, 2003
- Epholca arenosa (Butler, 1878)
- Epilobophora kostjuki Tikhonov, 1994
- Epione emundata Christoph, 1881
- Epione exaridaria Graeser, 1890
- Epione repandaria (Hufnagel, 1767)
- Epione vespertaria (Linnaeus, 1767)
- Epirranthis diversata ([Denis & Schiffermüller], 1775)
- Epirrhoe alternata (Miiller, 1764)
- Epirrhoe galiata ([Denis & Schiffermüller], 1775)
- Epirrhoe hastulata (Hübner, 1790)
- Epirrhoe molluginata (Hübner, [1813])
- Epirrhoe pupillata (Thunberg, 1788)
- Epirrhoe rivata (Hilbner, [1813])
- Epirrhoe supergressa (Butler, 1878)
- Epirrhoe tartuensis Mols, 1965
- Epirrhoe tristata (Linnaeus, 1758)
- Epirrita autumnata (Borkhausen, 1794)
- Epirrita christyi (Allen, 1906)
- Epirrita dilutata ([Denis & Schiffermüller], 1775)
- Episteira nigrilinearia (Leech, 1897)
- Epobeidia tigrata (Guenée, [1858])
- Erannis defoliaria (Clerck, 1759)
- Erannis golda Djakonov, 1929
- Erannis jacobsoni (Djakonov, 1926)
- Esakiopteryx volitans (Butler, 1878)
- Euchoeca nebulata (ScopoIi, 1763)
- Euchristophia cumulata (Christoph, 1881)
- Euchrognophos symmicta (Wehrli, 1953)
- Eucyclodes difficta (Walker, 1861)
- Eulithis achatinellaria (Oberthür, 1880)
- Eulithis convergenata (Bremer, 1864)
- Eulithis ledereri (Bremer, 1864)
- Eulithis mellinata (Fabricius, 1787)
- Eulithis populata (Linnaeus, 1758)
- Eulithis prunata (Linnaeus, 1758)
- Eulithis pyropata (Hübner, [1809])
- Eulithis testata (Linnaeus, 1761)
- Eumannia oppositaria (Mann, 1864)
- Euphyia biangulata (Haworth, 1809)
- Euphyia cineraria (Butler, 1878)
- Euphyia coangulata (Prout, 1914)
- Euphyia frustata (Treitschke, 1828)
- Euphyia sintenisi (Staudinger, 1892)
- Euphyia unangulata (Haworth, 1809)
- Eupithecia abbreviata Stephens, 1831
- Eupithecia abietaria (Goeze, 1781)
- Eupithecia absinthiata (Clerck, 1759)
- Eupithecia actaeata Walderdorff, 1869
- Eupithecia addictata Dietze, 1908
- Eupithecia albidulata Staudinger, 1892
- Eupithecia aliena Vojnits, 1982
- Eupithecia alliaria Staudinger, 1870
- Eupithecia amasina Bohatsch, 1893
- Eupithecia amplexata Christoph, 1881
- Eupithecia analoga Djakonov, 1926
- Eupithecia arenbergeri Pinker, 1976
- Eupithecia assa Mironov, 1989
- Eupithecia assimilata Doubleday, 1856
- Eupithecia barteli Dietze, 1908
- Eupithecia bastelbergeri Dietze, 1910
- Eupithecia bella Staudinger, 1897
- Eupithecia biornata Christoph, 1867
- Eupithecia bohatschi Staudinger, 1897
- Eupithecia breviculata (Donzel, 1837)
- Eupithecia carpophilata Staudinger, 1897
- Eupithecia cauchiata (Duponchel, 1830)
- Eupithecia centaureata ([Denis & Schiffermüller], 1775)
- Eupithecia clavifera Inoue, 1955
- Eupithecia consortaria Leech, 1897
- Eupithecia conterminata (Lienig & Zeller, 1846)
- Eupithecia corroborata Dietze, 1908
- Eupithecia daemionata Dietze, 1904
- Eupithecia denotata (Hübner, [1813])
- Eupithecia denticulata (Treitschke, 1828)
- Eupithecia despectaria Lederer, 1853
- Eupithecia detritata Staudinger, 1897
- Eupithecia dissertata (Pungeler, 1905)
- Eupithecia distinctaria Herrich-Schäffer, 1848
- Eupithecia dodoneata Guenée,[1858]
- Eupithecia egenaria Herrich-Schäffer, 1848
- Eupithecia emanata Dietze, 1908
- Eupithecia ericeata (Rambur, 1833)
- Eupithecia exiguata (Hübner, [1813])
- Eupithecia expallidata Doubleday, 1856
- Eupithecia extensaria (Freyer, 1845)
- Eupithecia extraversaria Herrich-Schäffer, 1852
- Eupithecia fennoscandica Knaben, 1949
- Eupithecia fuscicostata Christoph, 1887
- Eupithecia gelidata Moschler, 1860
- Eupithecia gigantea Staudinger, 1897
- Eupithecia graphata (Treitschke, 1828)
- Eupithecia gratiosata Herrich-Schäffer, 1861
- Eupithecia groenblomi Urbahn, 1969
- Eupithecia gueneata Milli&re, 1862
- Eupithecia habermani Viidalepp & Mironov, 1988
- Eupithecia haworthiata Doubleday, 1856
- Eupithecia holti Viidalepp, 1973
- Eupithecia homogrammata Dietze, 1908
- Eupithecia icterata (De Villers, 1789)
- Eupithecia immundata (Lienig & Zeller, 1846)
- Eupithecia inculta Vojnits, 1975
- Eupithecia indigata (Hübner, [1813])
- Eupithecia innotata (Hufnagel, 1767)
- Eupithecia insigniata (Hübner, 1790)
- Eupithecia insignioides Wehrli, 1923
- Eupithecia interpunctaria Inoue, 1979
- Eupithecia intricata (Zetterstedt, 1839)
- Eupithecia inturbata (Hübner, [1817])
- Eupithecia irriguata (Hübner, [1813])
- Eupithecia jezonica Matsumura, 1927
- Eupithecia kobayashii Inoue, 1958
- Eupithecia kurilensis Bryk, 1942
- Eupithecia lacteolata Dietze, 1906
- Eupithecia lanceata (Hübner, [1825])
- Eupithecia laquaearia Herrich-Schäffer, 1848
- Eupithecia lariciata (Freyer, 1842)
- Eupithecia leptogrammata Staudinger, 1882
- Eupithecia linariata ([Denis & Schiffermiiller], 1775)
- Eupithecia lvovskyi Mironov, 1988
- Eupithecia mandschurica Staudinger, 1897
- Eupithecia marginata Staudinger, 1892
- Eupithecia memorata Mironov, 1988
- Eupithecia millefoliata Rossler, 1866
- Eupithecia minusculata (Alphéraky, 1882)
- Eupithecia moecha Dietze, 1904
- Eupithecia nanata (Hübner, [1813])
- Eupithecia neosatyrata Inoue, 1979
- Eupithecia nobilitata Staudinger, 1882
- Eupithecia ochridata Schiitze & Pinker, 1968
- Eupithecia orphnata W.Petersen, 1909
- Eupithecia pernotata Guenée, [1858]
- Eupithecia persuastrix Mironov, 1990
- Eupithecia pfeifferi Wehrli, 1929
- Eupithecia pimpinellata (Hübner, [1813])
- Eupithecia plumbeolata (Haworth, 1809)
- Eupithecia praepupillata Wehrli, 1927
- Eupithecia proterva Butler, 1878
- Eupithecia pseudassimilata Viidalepp & Mironov, 1988
- Eupithecia pseudoicterata Schiitze, 1960
- Eupithecia pseudosatyrata Djakonov, 1929
- Eupithecia puengeleri Dietze, 1913
- Eupithecia pusillata ([Denis & Schiffermüller], 1775)
- Eupithecia pygmaeata (Hübner, [1799])
- Eupithecia pyreneata Mabille, 1871
- Eupithecia recens Dietze, 1904
- Eupithecia repentina Vojnits & De Laever, 1978
- Eupithecia rubeni Viidalepp, 1976
- Eupithecia satyrata (Hübner, [1813])
- Eupithecia scalptata Christoph, 1885
- Eupithecia schiefereri Bohatsch, 1893
- Eupithecia scribai Prout, 1938
- Eupithecia selinata Herrich-Schäffer, 1861
- Eupithecia semigraphata Bruand, [1851]
- Eupithecia serenata Staudinger, 1896
- Eupithecia silenata Assmann, 1848
- Eupithecia silenicolata Mabille, 1867
- Eupithecia simpliciata (Haworth, 1809)
- Eupithecia sinuosaria (Eversmann, 1848)
- Eupithecia sophia Butler, 1878
- Eupithecia spadiceata Zerny, 1933
- Eupithecia spadix Inoue, 1955
- Eupithecia spissilineata (Metzner, 1846)
- Eupithecia subbreviata Staudinger, 1897
- Eupithecia subbrunneata Dietze, 1904
- Eupithecia subdeverrata Vojnits, 1975
- Eupithecia subfenestrata Staudinger, 1892
- Eupithecia subfuscata (Haworth, 1809)
- Eupithecia suboxydata Staudinger, 1897
- Eupithecia subumbrata ([Denis & Schiffermüller], 1775)
- Eupithecia subvulgata Vojnits, 1982
- Eupithecia succenturiata (Linnaeus, 1758)
- Eupithecia sutiliata Christoph, 1876
- Eupithecia tabidaria Iuoue, 1955
- Eupithecia takao Inoue, 1955
- Eupithecia tantillaria Boisduval, 1840
- Eupithecia tantilloides Inoue, 1958
- Eupithecia tenuiata (Hübner, [1813])
- Eupithecia thalictrata (PiiugeIer, 1902)
- Eupithecia tribunaria Herrich-Schäffer, 1852
- Eupithecia tricornuta Inoue, 1980
- Eupithecia tripunctaria Herrich-Schäffer, 1852
- Eupithecia trisignaria Herrich-Schäffer, 1848
- Eupithecia usbeca Viidalepp, 1992
- Eupithecia valerianata (Hübner, [1813])
- Eupithecia variostrigata Alphéraky, 1876
- Eupithecia vaticina Vojnits, 1982
- Eupithecia venosata (Fabricius, 1787)
- Eupithecia veratraria Herrich-Schäffer, 1848
- Eupithecia virgaureata Doubleday, 1861
- Eupithecia vitiosata Mironov, 2001
- Eupithecia vulgata (Haworth, 1809)
- Eupithecia zibellinata Christoph, 1881
- Eustroma aerosa (Butler, 1878)
- Eustroma melancholica (Butler, 1878)
- Eustroma reticulata ([Denis & Schiffermüller], 1775)
- Exangerona prattiaria (Leech, 1891)
- Gagitodes parvaria (Leech, 1891)
- Gagitodes sagittata (Fabricius, 1787)
- Gandaritis agnes (Butler, 1878)
- Gandaritis evanescens (Butler, 1881)
- Gandaritis fixseni (Bremer, 1864)
- Gandaritis placida (Butler, 1878)
- Gandaritis pyraliata ([Denis & Schiffermüller], 1775)
- Garueus mirandus (Butler, 1881)
- Geometra albovenaria Bremer, 1864
- Geometra dieckmanni Graeser, 1889
- Geometra giaucaria Menetries, 1859
- Geometra papilionaria (Linnaeus, 1758)
- Geometra sponsaria (Bremer, 1864)
- Geometra ussuriensis (Sauber, 1915)
- Geometra valida R.Felder & Rogenhofer, 1875
- Glaucorhoe unduliferaria (Motschulsky, [1861])
- Glossotrophia diffinaria Prout, 1913
- Gnophos obfuscata ([Denis & Schiffermüller], 1775)
- Gymnoscelis esakii Inoue, 1955
- Gymnoscelis rufifasciata (Haworth, 1809)
- Gypsochroa renitidata (Hübner, [1817])
- Hastina subfalcaria (Christoph, 1881)
- Heliomata glarearia ([Denis & Schiffermüller], 1775)
- Hemistola chrysoprasaria (Esper, 1795)
- Hemistola nemoriata (Staudinger, 1897)
- Hemistola tenuilinea (Alphéraky, 1897)
- Hemistola zimmermanni (Hedemann, 1879)
- Hemithea aestivaria (Hübner, [1799])
- Herbulotia agilata (Christoph, 1881)
- Heterarmia buettneri (Hedemann, 1881)
- Heterarmia charon (Butler, 1878)
- Heterarmia dissimilis (Staudinger, 1897)
- Heterolocha laminaria (Herrich-Schäffer, 1852)
- Heterophleps confusa (Wileman, 1911)
- Heterothera kurenzovi Choi, Viidalepp & Vasiurin, 1998
- Heterothera postalbida (Wileman, 1911)
- Heterothera quadrifulta (Prout, 1938)
- Heterothera serraria (Lienig & Zeller, 1846)
- Heterothera serrataria (Prout, 1914)
- Heterothera taigana (Djakonov, 1926)
- Hirasa paupera (Butler, 1881)
- Holarctias rufinaria (Staudinger, 1861)
- Horisme aemulata (Hübner, [1813])
- Horisme aquata (Hübner, [1813])
- Horisme calligraphata (Herrich-Schäffer, 1838)
- Horisme corticata (Treitschke, 1835)
- Horisme falcata (Bang-Haas, 1907)
- Horisme incurvaria (Erschoff, 1877)
- Horisme lucillata (Guenée, [1858])
- Horisme milvaria (Christoph, 1893)
- Horisme scotosiata (Guenée, [1858])
- Horisme stratata (Wileman, 1911)
- Horisme tersata (Denis & Schiffermüller, 1775)
- Horisme vitalbata (Denis & Schiffermüller), 1775)
- Hydrelia adesma Prout, 1930
- Hydrelia bicauliata Prout, 1914
- Hydrelia flammeolaria (Hufnagel, 1767)
- Hydrelia gracilipennis Inoue, 1982
- Hydrelia musculata (Staudinger, 1897)
- Hydrelia nisaria (Christoph, 1881)
- Hydrelia parvulata (Staudinger, 1897)
- Hydrelia shioyana (Matsumura, 1927)
- Hydrelia sylvata ([Denis & Schiffermüller], 1775)
- Hydrelia tenera (Staudinger, 1897)
- Hydria cervinalis (Scopoli, 1763)
- Hydria flavipes (Menetries, 1858)
- Hydria hedemannaria (Oberthür, 1880)
- Hydria inanata (Christoph, 1881)
- Hydria incertata (Staudinger, 1882)
- Hydria latifasciaria (Leech, 1891)
- Hydria neocervinalis (Inoue, 1982)
- Hydria undulata (Linnaeus, 1758)
- Hydria veternata (Christoph, 1881)
- Hydriomena furcata (Thunberg, 1784)
- Hydriomena impluviata ([Denis & Schiffermüller], 1775)
- Hydriomena ruberata (Freyer, [1831])
- Hylaea fasciaria (Linnaeus, 1758)
- Hypomecis akiba (Inoue, 1963)
- Hypomecis crassestrigata (Christoph, 1881)
- Hypomecis kuriligena (Bryk, 1942)
- Hypomecis lunifera (Butler, 1878)
- Hypomecis phantomaria (Graeser, 1890)
- Hypomecis pseudopunctinalis (Wehrli, 1923)
- Hypomecis punctinalis (ScopoIi, 1763)
- Hypomecis roboraria ([Denis & Schiffermüller], 1775)
- Hypoxystis mandli Schawerda, 1924
- Hypoxystis pluviaria (Fabricius, 1787)
- Hypoxystis pulcheraria (Herz, 1905)
- Hysterura declinans (Staudinger, 1897)
- Idaea admiranda Hausmann, 2004
- Idaea aureolaria ([Denis & Schiffermüller], 1775)
- Idaea auricruda (Butler, 1879)
- Idaea aversata (Linnaeus, 1758)
- Idaea biselata (Hufnagel, 1767)
- Idaea camparia (Herrich-Schäffer, 1852)
- Idaea consanguinaria (Lederer, 1853)
- Idaea degeneraria (Hübner, [1799])
- Idaea denudaria (Prout, 1913)
- Idaea descitaria (Christoph, 1893)
- Idaea deversaria (Herrich-Schäffer, 1847)
- Idaea dilutaria (Hübner, [1799])
- Idaea dimidiata (Hufnagel, 1767)
- Idaea dohlmanni (Hedemann, 1881)
- Idaea effusaria (Christoph, 1881)
- Idaea elongaria (Rambur, 1833)
- Idaea emarginata (Linnaeus, 1758)
- Idaea falckii (Hedemann, 1879)
- Idaea foedata (Butler, 1879)
- Idaea fuscovenosa (Goeze, 1781)
- Idaea humiliata (Hufnagel, 1767)
- Idaea imbecilla (Inoue, 1955)
- Idaea inquinata (Scopoli, 1763)
- Idaea invalida (Butler, 1879)
- Idaea jakima (Butler, 1878)
- Idaea khankaensis Beljaev, 2006
- Idaea laevigata (Scopoli, 1763)
- Idaea mancipiata (Staudinger, 1871)
- Idaea moniliata ([Denis & Schiffermüller], 1775)
- Idaea muricata (Hufnagel, 1767)
- Idaea nielseni (Hedemann, 1879)
- Idaea nitidata (Herrich-Schäffer, 1861)
- Idaea nudaria (Christoph, 1881)
- Idaea obsoletaria (Rambur, 1833)
- Idaea ochrata (Scopoli, 1763)
- Idaea ossiculata (Lederer, 1870)
- Idaea pallidata ([Denis & Schiffermüller], 1775)
- Idaea politaria (Hübner, [1799])
- Idaea promiscuaria (Leech, 1897)
- Idaea pseudoaversata Vasilenko, 2007
- Idaea pseudopromiscuaria Vasilenko, 2000
- Idaea remissa (WiIeman, 1911)
- Idaea roseomarginaria (Inoue, 1958)
- Idaea rubraria (Staudinger, 1901)
- Idaea rufaria (Hübner, [1799])
- Idaea rusticata ([Denis & Schiffermüller], 1775)
- Idaea salutaria (Christoph, 1881)
- Idaea seriata (Schrank, 1802)
- Idaea sericeata (Hübner, [1813])
- Idaea serpentata (Hufnagel, 1767)
- Idaea straminata (Borkhausen, 1794)
- Idaea subsericeata (Haworth, 1809)
- Idaea sylvestraria (Hübner, [1799])
- Idaea terpnaria (Prout, 1913)
- Idaea trigeminata (Haworth, 1809)
- Idiochlora ussuriaria (Bremer, 1864)
- Idiotephria amelia (Butler, 1878)
- Idiotephria debilitata (Leech, 1891)
- Idiotephria evanescens (Staudinger, 1897)
- Inurois brunneus Viidalepp, 1986
- Inurois fumosa Inoue, [1944]
- Inurois membranaria (Christoph, 1881)
- Inurois punctigera (Prout, 1915)
- Inurois viidaleppi BeIjaev, 1996
- Iotaphora admirabilis (Oberthür, 1883)
- Isturgia roraria (Fabricius, [1776])
- Ithysia pravata (Hübner, [1813])
- Jankowskia athleta Oberthür, 1884
- Jankowskia bituminaria (Lederer, 1853)
- Jankowskia pseudathleta Sato, 1980
- Jodis lactearia (Linnaeus, 1758)
- Jodis praerupta (Butler, 1878)
- Jodis putata (Linnaeus, 1758)
- Juxtephria consentaria (Freyer, [1846])
- Kemtrognophos ambiguata (Duponchel, 1830)
- Kemtrognophos ciscaucasica (Rjabov, 1964)
- Kemtrognophos onustaria (Herrich-Schäffer, 1852)
- Kemtrognophos remmi Viidalepp, 1988
- Laciniodes denigrata Warren, 1896
- Lampropteryx albigirata (Kollar, [1844])
- Lampropteryx jameza (Butler, 1878)
- Lampropteryx korschunovi (Viidalepp, 1976)
- Lampropteryx minna (Butler, 1881)
- Lampropteryx otregiata (Metcalfe, 1917)
- Lampropteryx suffumata ([Denis & Schiffermüller], 1775)
- Larentia clavaria (Haworth, 1809)
- Larerannis felipjevi Wehrli, 1935
- Larerannis orthogrammaria (Wehrli, 1927)
- Leptostegna tenerata Christoph, 1881
- Leucobrephos middendorfii (Menetries, 1858)
- Ligdia adustata ([Denis & Schiffermüller], 1775)
- Lignyoptera fumidaria (Hübner, [1825])
- Limeria macraria Staudinger, 1892
- Lithostege bosporaria (Herrich-Schäffer, 1848)
- Lithostege coassata (Hübner, [1825])
- Lithostege farinata (Hufnagel, 1767)
- Lithostege griseata ([Denis & Schiffermüller], 1775)
- Lithostege infuscata (Eversmann, 1837)
- Lithostege ochraceata Staudinger, 1897
- Lithostege odessaria (Boisduval, 1848)
- Lithostege onkhoica Vasilenko & Gordeeva, 2004
- Lithostege pallescens Staudinger, 1897
- Lobogonodes erectana (Leech, 1897)
- Lobophora halterata (Hufnagel, 1767)
- Lomaspilis marginata (Linnaeus, 1758)
- Lomaspilis opis Butler, 1878
- Lomographa bimaculata (Fabricius, 1775)
- Lomographa buraetica (Staudinger, 1892)
- Lomographa lungtanensis (Wehrli, 1939)
- Lomographa nivea (Djakonov, 1936)
- Lomographa pulverata (Bang-Haas, 1910)
- Lomographa subspersata (Wehrli, 1939)
- Lomographa temerata ([Denis & Schiffermüller], 1775)
- Luxiaria amasa (Butler, 1878)
- Lycia hanoviensis (Heymons, 1891)
- Lycia hirtaria (Clerck, 1759)
- Lycia lapponaria (Boisduval, 1840)
- Lycia pomonaria (Hübner, 1790)
- Lycia zonaria ([Denis & Schiffermüller], 1775)
- Lythria cruentaria (Hufnagel, 1767)
- Lythria purpuraria (Linnaeus, 1758)
- Macaria alternata ([Denis & Schiffermüller], 1775)
- Macaria artesiaria ([Denis & Schiffermüller], 1775)
- Macaria brunneata (Thunberg, 1784)
- Macaria carbonaria (Clerck, 1759)
- Macaria circumflexaria (Eversmann, 1848)
- Macaria continuaria (Eversmann, 1852)
- Macaria fuscaria (Leech, 1891)
- Macaria halituaria (Guenée, [1858])
- Macaria liturata (Clerck, 1759)
- Macaria loricaria (Eversmann, 1837)
- Macaria notata (Linnaeus, 1758)
- Macaria shanghaisaria Walker, 1861
- Macaria signaria (Hübner, [1809])
- Macaria wauaria (Linnaeus, 1758)
- Malacodea regelaria Tengstrom, 1869
- Martania fulvida (Butler, 1881)
- Martania minimata (Staudinger, 1897)
- Martania saxea (Wileman, 1911)
- Martania taeniata (Stephens, 1831)
- Maxates fuscofrons (Inoue, 1954)
- Maxates grandificaria (Graeser, 1890)
- Megabiston plumosaria (Leech, 1891)
- Megametopon griseolaria (Eversmann, 1848)
- Megaspilates mundataria (Stoll, 1782)
- Melanthia mandshuricata (Bremer, 1864)
- Melanthia procellata ([Denis & Schiffermüller], 1775)
- Menophra senilis (Butler, 1878)
- Mesastrape fulguraria (Walker, 1860)
- Mesoleuca albicillata (Linnaeus, 1758)
- Mesotype didymata (Linnaeus, 1758)
- Mesotype parallelolineata (Retzius, 1783)
- Mesotype verberata (Scopoli, 1763)
- Metabraxas clerica Butler, 1881
- Metacrocallis vernalis Beljaev, 1997
- Meteima mediorufa (Bastelberger, 1911)
- Microbiston lanaria (Eversmann, 1852)
- Microbiston phaeothorax Wehrli, 1941
- Microcalicha sordida (Butler, 1878)
- Microloxia herbaria (Hübner, [1813])
- Minoa murinata (Scopoli, 1763)
- Monocerotesa lutearia (Leech, 1891)
- Mujiaoshakua plana (Wileman, 1911)
- Napuca albaria (Bartel, 1903)
- Napuca curvaria (Eversmann, 1852)
- Napuca forbesi (Munroe, 1963)
- Napuca kozhantchikovi (Munroe, 1963)
- Napuca mongolicus (Vojnits, 1975)
- Napuca obscurata (Wehrli, 1953)
- Napuca ochrearia (Rossi, 1794)
- Napuca orciferaria Walker, [1863]
- Napuca staudingeri (Vojnits, 1975)
- Napuca taylori (Butler, 1893)
- Narraga fasciolaria (Hufnagel, 1767)
- Narraga tessularia (Metzner, 1845)
- Naxa seriaria (Motschulsky, 1866)
- Nebula approximata (Staudinger, 1879)
- Nebula egenata (Prout, 1914)
- Nebula mongoliata (Staudinger, 1897)
- Nebula nebulata (Treitschke, 1828)
- Nebula propagata (Christoph, 1893)
- Neognopharmia stevenaria (Boisduval, 1840)
- Nothocasis bellaria (Leech, 1891)
- Nothocasis sertata (Hübner, [1817])
- Nothomiza submediostrigata Wehrli, 1939
- Nychiodes divergaria Staudinger, 1892
- Nyssiodes lefuarius (Erschoff, 1872)
- Ochodontia adustaria (Fischer von Waldheim, 1840)
- Ochyria quadrifasiata (Clerck, 1759)
- Ocoelophora lentiginosaria (Leech, 1891)
- Odezia atrata (Linnaeus, 1758)
- Odontognophos dumetata (Treitschke, 1827)
- Odontognophos zacharia (Staudinger, 1879)
- Odontopera aurata (Prout, 1915)
- Odontopera bidentata (Clerck, 1759)
- Odontorhoe fidonaria (Staudinger, 1892)
- Operophtera brumata (Linnaeus, 1758)
- Operophtera brunnea Nakajima, 1991
- Operophtera elegans Beljaev, 1996
- Operophtera fagata (Scharfenberg, 1805)
- Operophtera japonaria (Leech, 1891)
- Operophtera peninsularis Djakonov, 1931
- Operophtera rectipostmediana Inoue, 1942
- Operophtera relegata Prout, 1908
- Ophthalmitis albosignaria (Bremer & Grey, 1853)
- Ophthalmitis irrorataria (Bremer & Grey, 1853)
- Opisthograptis luteolata (Linnaeus, 1758)
- Orihostixis cribraria (Hübner, [1799])
- Orthonama obstipata (Fabricius, 1794)
- Orthonama vittata (Borkhausen, 1794)
- Ourapteryx falciformis Inoue, 1993
- Ourapteryx japonica Inoue, 1993
- Ourapteryx koreana Inoue, 1993
- Ourapteryx maculicaudaria (Motschulsky, 1866)
- Ourapteryx sambucaria (Linnaeus, 1758)
- Ourapteryx ussurica Inoue, 1993
- Pachycnemia hippocastanaria (Hübner, [1799])
- Pachyerannis obliquaria (Motschulsky, [1861])
- Parabapta aetheriata (Graeser, 1889)
- Parabapta clarissa (Butler, 1878)
- Paradarisa consonaria (Hübner, [1799])
- Paradysstroma corussaria (Oberthür, 1880)
- Paraleptomiza bilinearia (Leech, 1897)
- Parectropis nigrosparsa (WiIeman & South, 1917)
- Parectropis similaria (Hufnagel, 1767)
- Pareulype berberata ([Denis & Schiffermüller], 1775)
- Pareulype consanguinea (Butler, 1878)
- Pasiphila chloerata (Mabille, 1870)
- Pasiphila debiliata (Hübner, [1817])
- Pasiphila excisa (Butler, 1878)
- Pasiphila obscura (West, 1929)
- Pasiphila rectangulata (Linnaeus, 1758)
- Pasiphila subcinctata (Prout, 1915)
- Pelurga comitata (Linnaeus, 1758)
- Pelurga onoi (Inoue, 1965)
- Pelurga taczanowskiaria (Oberthür, 1880)
- Pennithera comis (Butler, 1879)
- Pennithera djakonovi (Kurentzov, 1950)
- Perconia strigillaria (Hübner, [1787])
- Peribatodes correptaria (Zeller, 1847)
- Peribatodes rhomboidaria ([Denis & Schiffermüller], 1775)
- Peribatodes secundaria ([Denis & Schiffermüller], 1775)
- Perizoma affinitata (Stephens, 1831)
- Perizoma albulata ([Denis & Schiffermüller], 1775)
- Perizoma alchemillata (Linnaeus, 1758)
- Perizoma bifaciata (Haworth, 1809)
- Perizoma blandiata ([Denis & Schiffermüller], 1775)
- Perizoma contrita (Prout, 1914)
- Perizoma flavofasciata (Thunberg, 1792)
- Perizoma haasi (Hedemann, 1881)
- Perizoma hydrata (Treitschke, 1829)
- Perizoma illepida (Inoue, 1955)
- Perizoma lugdunaria (Herrich-Schäffer, 1855)
- Perizoma minorata (Treitschke, 1828)
- Perizoma parahydrata (Alberti, 1969)
- Petrophora chlorosata (Scopoli, 1763)
- Phaiogramma etruscaria (Zeller, 1849)
- Phanerothyris sinearia (Guenée, [1858])
- Phaselia serrularia (Eversmann, 1847)
- Phibalapteryx virgata (Hufnagel, 1767)
- Phigalia djakonovi Moltrecht, 1933
- Phigalia pilosaria ([Denis & Schiffermüller], 1775)
- Phigalia sinuosaria Leech, 1897
- Phigalia verecundaria (Leech, 1897)
- Phigalia viridularia Beljaev, 1996
- Phigaliohybernia latifasciaria Beljaev, 1996
- Philereme corrugata Butler, 1884
- Philereme transversata (Hufnagel, 1767)
- Philereme vetulata ([Denis & Schiffermüller], 1775)
- Photoscotosia atrostrigata (Bremer, 1864)
- Photoscotosia palaearctica (Staudinger, 1882)
- Phthonandria emaria (Bremer, 1864)
- Phthonosema corearia (Leech, 1891)
- Phthonosema invenustaria (Leech, 1891)
- Phthonosema serratilinearia (Leech, 1897)
- Phthonosema tendinosaria (Bremer, 1864)
- Phyllometra culminaria (Eversmann, 1843)
- Plagodis dolabraria (Linnaeus, 1767)
- Plagodis pulveraria (Linnaeus, 1758)
- Planociampa antipala Prout, 1930
- Plemyria rubiginata ([Denis & Schiffermüller], 1775)
- Plerotocera insignilinearia Beljaev, 1994
- Plerotocera ussurica Djakonov, 1949
- Polythrena coloraria (Herrich-Schäffer, 1855)
- Praethera anomala (Inoue, 1954)
- Praethera praefecta (Prout, 1914)
- Problepsis phoebearia Erschoff, 1870
- Problepsis plagiata (Butler, 1881)
- Problepsis superans Butler, 1885
- Protalcis concinnata (Wileman, 1911)
- Proteostrenia leda (Butler, 1878)
- Proteostrenia reticulata (Sterneck, 1928)
- Proteuchloris neriaria (Herrich-Schäffer, 1852)
- Protoboarmia faustinata (Warren, 1897)
- Protoboarmia simpliciaria (Leech, 1897)
- Protorhoe corollaria (Herrich-Schäffer, 1848)
- Protorhoe unicata (Guenée, [1858])
- Protothera firmata (Hübner, [1822])
- Pseudentephria lamata (Staudinger, 1897)
- Pseuderannis lomozemia (Prout, 1930)
- Pseudobaptria corydalaria (Graeser, 1889)
- Pseudopanthera macularia (Linnaeus, 1758)
- Pseudostegania defectata (Christoph, 1881)
- Pseudoterpna pruinata (Hufnagel, 1767)
- Psilalcis keytiparki Beljaev & Stuning, 2000
- Psodos coracina (Esper, 1805)
- Psodos sajana Wehrli, 1919
- Psychophora cinderella Viidalepp, 2001
- Psychophora sabini Kirby, 1824
- Psyra boarmiata (Graeser, 1893)
- Pterapherapteryx sexalata (Retzius, 1783)
- Pterygnophos agnitaria (Staudinger, 1897)
- Pterygnophos creperaria (Erschoff, 1877)
- Pterygnophos dorkadiaria (Wehrli, 1922)
- Pterygnophos ochrofasciata (Staudinger, 1896)
- Ptygmatophora staudingeri (Christoph, 1881)
- Pungeleria capreolaria ([Denis & Schiffermüller], 1775)
- Pygmaena fusca (Thunberg, 1792)
- Rheumaptera hastata (Linnaeus, 1758)
- Rheumaptera hecate (Butler, 1878)
- Rheumaptera subhastata (Nolcken, 1870)
- Rhodometra sacraria (Linnaeus, 1767)
- Rhodostrophia badiaria (Freyer, 1841)
- Rhodostrophia calabra (Petagna, 1786)
- Rhodostrophia jacularia (Hübner, [1813])
- Rhodostrophia terrestraria (Lederer, 1869)
- Rhodostrophia vibicaria (Clerck, 1759)
- Rhopalognophos glaucinaria (Hübner, [1799])
- Scardamia aurantiacaria Bremer, 1864
- Scardamia obliquaria Leech, 1897
- Schistostege nubilaria (Hübner, [1799])
- Scionomia anomala (Butler, 1881)
- Scionomia mendica (Butler, 1879)
- Scionomia parasinuosa Inoue, 1982
- Scopula aequifasciata (Christoph, 1881)
- Scopula agutsaensis Vasilenko, 1997
- Scopula albiceraria (Herrich-Schäffer, 1844)
- Scopula apicipunctata (Christoph, 1881)
- Scopula arenosaria (Staudinger, 1879)
- Scopula asthena Inoue, 1943
- Scopula astheniata Viidalepp, 2005
- Scopula axiata (Pungeler, 1909)
- Scopula beckeraria (Lederer, 1853)
- Scopula cajanderi (Herz, 1904)
- Scopula coniaria (Prout, 1913)
- Scopula corrivalaria (Kretschmar, 1862)
- Scopula decorata ([Denis & Schiffermüller], 1775)
- Scopula dignata (Guenée, [1858])
- Scopula disclusaria (Christoph, 1881)
- Scopula divisaria (Christoph, 1893)
- Scopula eunupta Vasilenko, 1998
- Scopula flaccidaria (Zeller, 1852)
- Scopula floslactata (Haworth, 1809)
- Scopula frigidaria (Moschler, 1860)
- Scopula ichinosawana (Matsumura, 1925)
- Scopula ignobilis (Warren, 1901)
- Scopula imitaria (Hübner, [1799])
- Scopula immistaria (Herrich-Schäffer, 1852)
- Scopula immorata (Linnaeus, 1758)
- Scopula immutata (Linnaeus, 1758)
- Scopula impersonata (Walker, 1861)
- Scopula incanata (Linnaeus, 1758)
- Scopula marginepunctata (Goeze, 1781)
- Scopula modicaria (Leech, 1897)
- Scopula nemoraria (Hübner, [1799])
- Scopula nigropunctata (Hufnagel, 1767)
- Scopula nivearia (Leech, 1897)
- Scopula nupta (Butler, 1878)
- Scopula ochraceata (Staudinger, 1901)
- Scopula orientalis (Alphéraky, 1876)
- Scopula ornata (Scopoli, 1763)
- Scopula permutata (Staudinger, 1897)
- Scopula prouti Djakonov, 1935
- Scopula pudicaria (Motschulsky, [1861])
- Scopula rubiginata (Hufnagel, 1767)
- Scopula semignobilis Inoue, 1942
- Scopula submutata (Treitschke, 1828)
- Scopula subpunctaria (Herrich-Schäffer, 1847)
- Scopula subtilata (Christoph, 1867)
- Scopula superior (Butler, 1878)
- Scopula supernivearia Inoue, 1963
- Scopula tenuisocius Inoue, 1942
- Scopula ternata Schrank, 1802
- Scopula tessellaria (Boisduval, 1840)
- Scopula turbulentaria (Staudinger, 1870)
- Scopula umbelaria (Hübner, [1813])
- Scopula virginalis (Fourcroy, 1785)
- Scopula virgulata ([Denis & Schiffermüller], 1775)
- Scopula vojnitsi Inoue, 1992
- Scotopteryx acutangulata (Inoue, 1941)
- Scotopteryx aelptes (Prout, 1937)
- Scotopteryx alpherakii (Erschoff, 1877)
- Scotopteryx bipunctaria ([Denis & Schiffermüller], 1775)
- Scotopteryx burgaria (Eversmann, 1843)
- Scotopteryx chenopodiata (Linnaeus, 1758)
- Scotopteryx coarctaria ([Denis & Schiffermüller], 1775)
- Scotopteryx langi (Christoph, 1885)
- Scotopteryx luridata (Hufnagel, 1767)
- Scotopteryx moeniata (Scopoli, 1763)
- Scotopteryx mucronata (Scopoli, 1763)
- Scotopteryx pinnaria (Christoph, 1888)
- Scotopteryx subvicinaria (Staudinger, 1892)
- Scotopteryx transbaicalica (Djakonov, 1955)
- Selenia dentaria (Fabricius, 1775)
- Selenia lunularia (Hübner, [1788])
- Selenia ononica I.Kostjuk, 1991
- Selenia sordidaria Leech, 1897
- Selenia tetralunaria (Hufnagel, 1767)
- Seleniopsis evanescens (Butler, 1881)
- Selidosema brunnearia (De Villers, 1789)
- Selidosema plumaria ([Denis & Schiffermüller], 1775)
- Sibatania mactata (R. Felder & Rogenhofer, 1875)
- Siona lineata (Scopoli, 1763)
- Solitanea defricata (Pungeler, 1904)
- Somatina indicataria (Walker, 1861)
- Spargania luctuata ([Denis & Schiffermüller], 1775)
- Spartopteryx kindermannaria (Staudinger, 1871)
- Spilopera debilis (Butler, 1878)
- Spiralisigna subpumilata (Inoue, 1972)
- Stamnodes danilovi Erschoff, 1877
- Stamnodes depeculata (Lederer, 1870)
- Stamnodes pauperaria (Eversmann, 1848)
- Stegania cararia (Hübner, 1790)
- Stegania dalmataria (Guenée, [1858])
- Stegania dilectaria (Hübner, 1790)
- Stegania trimaculata (De Villers, 1789)
- Synegia ichinosawana (Matsumura, 1925)
- Synopsia sociaria (Hübner, [1799])
- Synopsia strictaria (Lederer, 1853)
- Taeniophila unio (Oberthür, 1880)
- Tephrina arenacearia ([Denis & Schiffermüller], 1775)
- Tephrina inconspicuaria (Hübner, [1819])
- Tephrina kaszabi Vojnits, 1974
- Tephrina murinaria ([Denis & Schiffermüller], 1775)
- Tephronia sepiana (Hufnagel, 1767)
- Thalera chlorosaria Graeser, 1890
- Thalera fimbrialis (Scopoli, 1763)
- Thalera lacerataria Graeser, 1889
- Thera bellisi Viidalepp, 1977
- Thera britannica (Turner, 1925)
- Thera cognata (Thunberg, 1792)
- Thera juniperata (Linnaeus, 1758)
- Thera obeliscata (Hübner, [1787])
- Thera variata ([Denis & Schiffermüller], 1775)
- Thera vetustata ([Denis & Schiffermüller], 1775)
- Therapis flavicaria ([Denis & Schiffermüller], 1775)
- Theria crypta Wehrli, 1940
- Theria rupicapraria ([Denis & Schiffermüller], 1775)
- Thetidia albocostaria (Bremer, 1864)
- Thetidia chlorophyllaria (Hedemann, 1879)
- Thetidia correspondens (Alphéraky, 1883)
- Thetidia smaragdaria (Fabricius, 1787)
- Timandra apicirosea (Prout, 1935)
- Timandra comae Schmidt, 1931
- Timandra comptaria Walker, [1863]
- Timandra dichela (Prout, 1935)
- Timandra griseata W.Petersen, 1902
- Timandra paralias (Prout, 1935)
- Timandra recompta (Prout, 1930)
- Timandra rectistrigaria (Eversmann, 1851)
- Trichobaptria exsecuta (R.Felder & Rogenhofer, 1875)
- Trichodezia haberhaueri (Lederer, 1864)
- Trichodezia kindermanni (Bremer, 1864)
- Trichopteryx carpinata (Borkhausen, 1794)
- Trichopteryx exportata (Staudinger, 1897)
- Trichopteryx fastuosa Inoue, 1958
- Trichopteryx grisearia (Leech, 1891)
- Trichopteryx hemana (Butler, 1878)
- Trichopteryx incerta Yazaki, 1978
- Trichopteryx polycommata ([Denis & Schiffermüller], 1775)
- Trichopteryx terranea (Butler, 1878)
- Trichopteryx ussurica (Wehrli, 1927)
- Trichopteryx ustata (Christoph, 1881)
- Triphosa dubitata (Linnaeus, 1758)
- Triphosa sabaudiata (Duponchel, 1830 )
- Triphosa sericata (Butler, 1879)
- Triphosa taochata Lederer, 1870
- Triphosa vashti (Butler, 1878)
- Tristrophis veneris (Butler, 1878)
- Tyloptera bella (Butler, 1878)
- Venusia blomeri (Curtis, 1832)
- Venusia cambrica Curtis, 1839
- Venusia laria Oberthür, 1893
- Venusia phasma (Butler, 1879)
- Venusia semistrigata (Christoph, 1881)
- Wilemania nitobei (Nitobe, 1907)
- Xanthorhoe abrasaria (Herrich-Schäffer, [1855])
- Xanthorhoe abraxina (Butler, 1879)
- Xanthorhoe annotinata (Zetterstedt, 1839)
- Xanthorhoe aridela (Prout, 1937)
- Xanthorhoe asiatica (Staudinger, 1882)
- Xanthorhoe biriviata (Borkhausen, 1794)
- Xanthorhoe decoloraria (Esper, [1806])
- Xanthorhoe deflorata (Erschoff, 1877)
- Xanthorhoe derzhavini (Djakonov, 1931)
- Xanthorhoe designata (Hufnagel, 1767)
- Xanthorhoe evae Viidalepp & Remm, 1982
- Xanthorhoe ferrugata (Clerck, 1759)
- Xanthorhoe fluctuata (Linnaeus, 1758)
- Xanthorhoe hortensiaria (Graeser, 1890)
- Xanthorhoe insperata (Djakonov, 1926)
- Xanthorhoe kamtshatica (Djakonov, 1929)
- Xanthorhoe majorata Heydemann, 1936
- Xanthorhoe montanata ([Denis & Schiffermüller], 1775)
- Xanthorhoe muscicapata (Christoph, 1881)
- Xanthorhoe okchotinaria Beljaev & Vasilenko, 1998
- Xanthorhoe pseudomajorata Vasilenko, 2003
- Xanthorhoe rectantemediana (Wehrli, 1927)
- Xanthorhoe rectifasciaria (Lederer, 1853)
- Xanthorhoe sajanaria (Prout, 1914)
- Xanthorhoe spadicearia ([Denis & Schiffermüller], 1775)
- Xanthorhoe stupida (Alphéraky, 1897)
- Xanthorhoe uralensis Choi, 2003
- Xenortholitha propinguata (Kollar, [1844])
- Xerodes albonotaria (Bremer, 1864)
- Xerodes rufescentaria (Motschulsky, [1861])
- Zanclidia testacea (Butler, 1881)
- Zola terranea (Butler, 1879)

== Bombycoidea ==
=== Lasiocampidae ===
- Amurilla subpurpurea (Butler, 1881)
- Bhima eximia Oberthür, 1880
- Bhima idiota (Graeser, 1888)
- Chilena sordida (Erschoff, 1874)
- Cosmotriche lobulina ([Denis & Schiffermüller], 1775)
- Dendrolimus pini (Linnaeus, 1758)
- Dendrolimus spectabilis (Butler, 1877)
- Dendrolimus superans (Butler, 1881)
- Eriogaster arbusculae Freyer, 1849
- Eriogaster henkei (Staudinger, 1879)
- Eriogaster lanestris (Linnaeus, 1758)
- Eriogaster neogena (Fisher von Waldheim, 1824)
- Euthrix albomaculata (Bremer, 1861)
- Euthrix laeta (Walker, 1855)
- Euthrix potatoria (Linnaeus, 1758)
- Gastropacha clathrata Bryk, 1948
- Gastropacha orientalis Sheljuzhko, 1943
- Gastropacha populifolia (Esper, 1784)
- Gastropacha quercifolia (Linnaeus, 1758)
- Kunugia undans (Walker, 1855)
- Lasiocampa eversmanni (Kindermann, 1843)
- Lasiocampa quercus (Linnaeus, 1758)
- Lasiocampa trifolii ([Denis & Schiffermüller], 1775)
- Macrothylacia rubi (Linnaeus, 1758)
- Malacosoma castrense (Linnaeus, 1758)
- Malacosoma franconicum ([Denis & Schiffermüller], 1775)
- Malacosoma neustrium (Linnaeus, 1758)
- Malacosoma squalorum Zolotuhin, 1994
- Odonestis pruni (Linnaeus, 1758)
- Pachypasa otus (Drury, 1773)
- Paralebeda femorata (Menetries, 1858)
- Phyllodesma griseum I.Kostjuk & Zolotuhin, 1994
- Phyllodesma ilicifolium (Linnaeus, 1758)
- Phyllodesma japonicum (Leech, [1889])
- Phyllodesma joannisi de Lajonquiere, 1963
- Phyllodesma jurii I.Kostjuk, 1992
- Phyllodesma tremulifolium (Hübner, [1810])
- Poecilocampa aphelia Tschistjakov & Zolotuhin, 1994
- Poecilocampa populi (Linnaeus, 1758)
- Poecilocampa tamanukii (Matsumura, 1928)
- Poecilocampa tenera Bang-Haas, 1927
- Somadasys brevivenis (Butler, 1885)
- Streblote stupidum (Staudinger, 1887)
- Syrastrenopsis moltrechti Grünberg, 1914
- Takanea excisa (Wileman, 1910)
- Trabala vishnou (Lefebvre, 1827)
- Trichiura crataegi (Linnaeus, 1758)

=== Bombycidae ===
- Bombyx mori (Linnaeus, 1758)
- Oberthueria caeca (Oberthür, 1880)
- Rondotia menciana Moore, 1885

=== Endromididae ===
- Endromis versicolora (Linnaeus, 1758)
- Mirina christophi (Staudinger, 1887)

=== Saturniidae ===
- Actias artemis (Bremer & Grey, 1852)
- Actias gnoma (Butler, 1877)
- Aglia japonica Leach, [1889]
- Aglia tau (Linnaeus, 1758)
- Antheraea pernyi (Guérin-Méneville, 1861)
- Antheraea yamamai (Guérin-Méneville, 1855)
- Caligula boisduvalii (Eversmann, 1846)
- Caligula japonica Moore, 1862
- Eriogyna pyretorum (Westwood, 1847)
- Eudia pavonia (Linnaeus, 1758)
- Eudia spini ([Denis &, Schiffermüller], 1775)
- Neoris huttoni Moore, 1862
- Rhodinia fugax (Butler, 1877)
- Rhodinia jankowskii (Oberthür, 1880)
- Samia cynthia (Drury, [1773])
- Saturnia pyri ([Denis & Schiffermüller], 1775)

=== Lemoniidae ===
- Lemonia taraxaci ([Dennis & Schiffermüller], 1775)
- Lemonia dumi (Linnaeus, 1761)
- Lemonia ballioni (Christoph, 1888)
- Lemonia balcanica (Herrich-Schäffer, 1847)

=== Brahmaeidae ===
- Brahmaea tancrei Austaut, 1896

=== Sphingidae ===
- Acherontia atropos (Linnaeus, 1758)
- Acherontia lachesis (Fabricius, 1798)
- Acosmeryx naga (Moore, [1858])
- Agrius convolvuli (Linnaeus, 1758)
- Ampelophaga rubiginosa Bremer & Grey, 1853
- Callambulyx tatarinovii (Bremer & Grey, 1853)
- Cephonodes hylas (Linnaeus, [1771])
- Choerocampa askoldensis (Oberthür, 1879)
- Choerocampa porcellus (Linnaeus, 1758)
- Choerocampa suellus (Staudinger, 1878)
- Clanis bilineata (Walker, 1866)
- Clanis undulosa Moore, 1879
- Daphnis nerii (Linnaeus, 1758)
- Deilephila elpenor (Linnaeus, 1758)
- Dolbina exacta Staudinger, 1892
- Dolbina tancrei Staudinger, 1887
- Hemaris affinis (Bremer, 1861)
- Hemaris alternata (Butler, 1874)
- Hemaris croatica (Esper, [1800])
- Hemaris fuciformis (Linnaeus, 1758)
- Hemaris radians (Walker, 1856)
- Hemaris saldaitisi Eitschberger, Danner & Surholt, 1998
- Hemaris staudingeri Leech, 1890
- Hemaris tityus (Linnaeus, 1758)
- Hippotion celerio (Linnaeus, 1758)
- Hyles chuvilini Danner, Eitschberger & Surholt, 1998
- Hyles costata (Nordmann, [1851])
- Hyles euphorbiae (Linnaeus, 1758)
- Hyles gallii (Rottemburg, 1775)
- Hyles hippophaes (Esper, [1793])
- Hyles livornica (Esper,[1779])
- Hyles nicaea (Prunner, 1798)
- Hyles vespertilio (Esper, [1780])
- Hyles zygophylli (Ochsenheimer, 1808)
- Hyloicus morio Rothschild & Jordan, 1903
- Hyloicus pinastri (Linnaeus, 1758)
- Kentrochrysalis consimilis Rothschild & Jordan, 1903
- Kentrochrysalis sieversi Alphéraky, 1897
- Kentrochrysalis streckeri (Staudinger, 1880)
- Laothoe amurensis (Staudinger, 1892)
- Laothoe populeti Bienert, 1870
- Laothoe populi (Linnaeus, 1758)
- Macroglossum bombylans Boisduval, [1875]
- Macroglossum pyrrhosticta Butler, 1875
- Macroglossum saga Butler, 1878
- Macroglossum stellatarum (Linnaeus, 1758)
- Marumba gaschkewitschii (Bremer & Grey, 1853)
- Marumba jankowskii (Oberthür, 1880)
- Marumba maackii (Bremer, 1861)
- Marumba quercus ([Denis & Schiffermüller], 1775)
- Marumba sperchius (Menetries, 1857)
- Mimas christophi (Staudinger, 1887)
- Mimas tiliae (Linnaeus, 1758)
- Phyllosphingia dissimilis (Bremer, 1861)
- Proserpinus proserpina (Pallas, 1772)
- Psilogramma menephron (Cramer, [1780])
- Rhagastis mongoliana (Butler, [1876])
- Smerinthus caecus Menetries, 1857
- Smerinthus ocellatus (Linnaeus, 1758)
- Smerinthus planus Walker, 1856
- Sphecodina caudata (Bremer & Grey, 1853)
- Sphingonaepiopsis gorgoniades (Hübner, [1819])
- Sphingonaepiopsis kuldjaensis (Graeser, 1892)
- Sphingulus mus Staudinger, 1887
- Sphinx ligustri Linnaeus, 1758
- Theretra alecto (Linnaeus, 1758)
- Theretra japonica (Boisduval, 1869)
- Theretra oldenlandiae (Fabricius, 1775)
