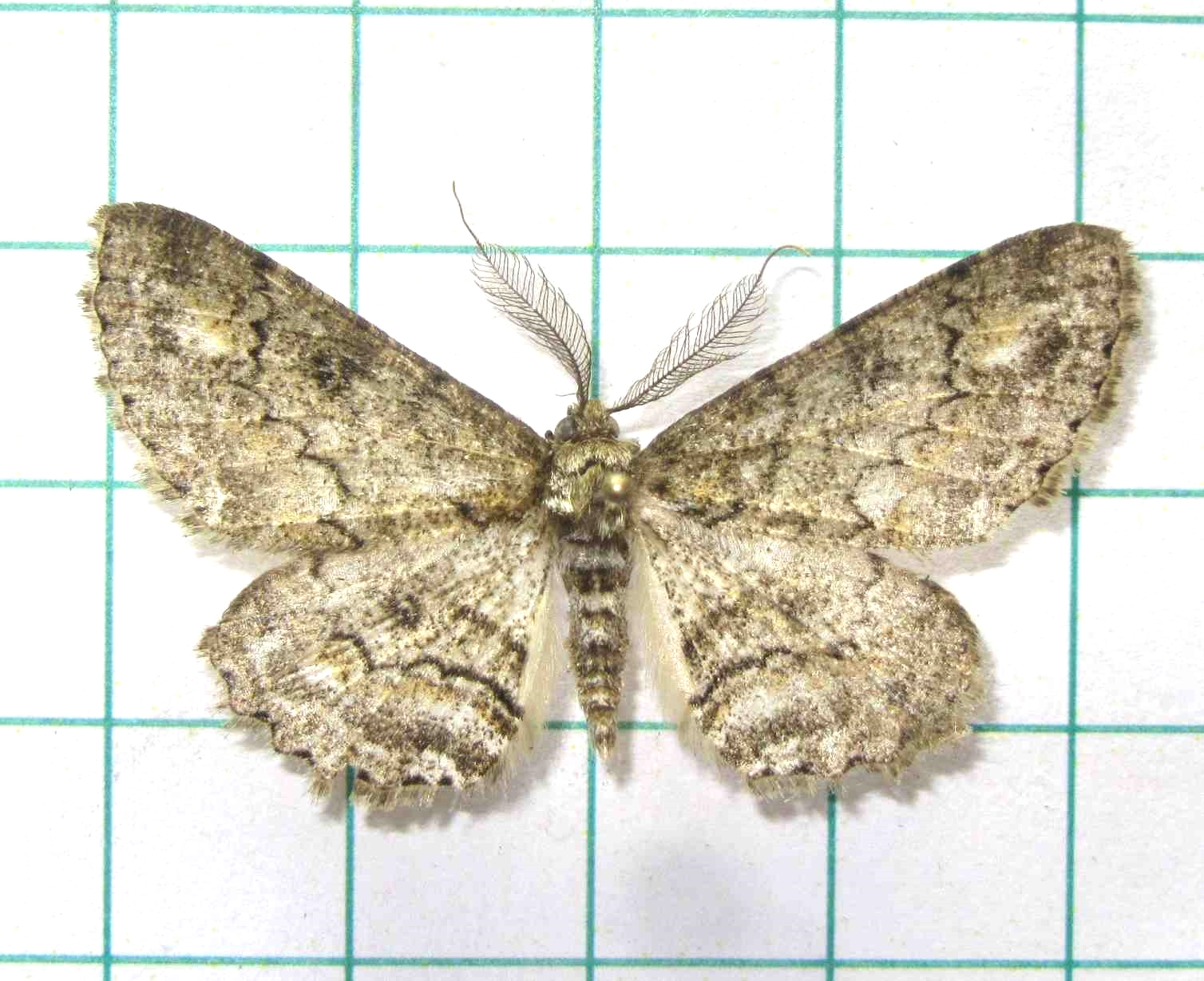
- Cleora leucophaea taiwanensis (Sato, 2002)

Scientific classification
- Domain: Eukaryota
- Kingdom: Animalia
- Phylum: Arthropoda
- Class: Insecta
- Order: Lepidoptera
- Family: Geometridae
- Genus: Cleora
- Species: C. leucophaea

Binomial name
- Cleora leucophaea (Butler, 1878)

Subspecies
- Cleora leucophaea taiwanensis (Sato, 2002)

Synonyms
- Boarmia leucophaea Butler, 1878; Boarmia elegans Oberthür, 1884; Boarmia pagina Wileman, 1911; Boarmia (Cleora) leucophaea ab. pagina, L.B. Prout, 1915; Boarmia leucophaea nigrofasciaria (Leech, 1897); Boarmia nigrofasciaria (Püngeler, 1897); Cleora elegans (Oberthur, 1884); Cleora leucophaea (Butler, 1878); Cleora pagina (Wileman, 1911)

= Cleora leucophaea =

Species of moth

Cleora leucophaea is a species of moth in the family Geometridae. It is found in East Asia (Russia, Taiwan, Japan, South Korea).

== Subspecies ==
- Cleora leucophaea leucophaea
- Cleora leucophaea taiwanensis Sato, 2002

== See also ==
- List of moths of Taiwan
- List of moths of Russia (Geometroidea-Bombycoidea)
- List of moths of Japan (Bombycoidea-Geometroidea)
