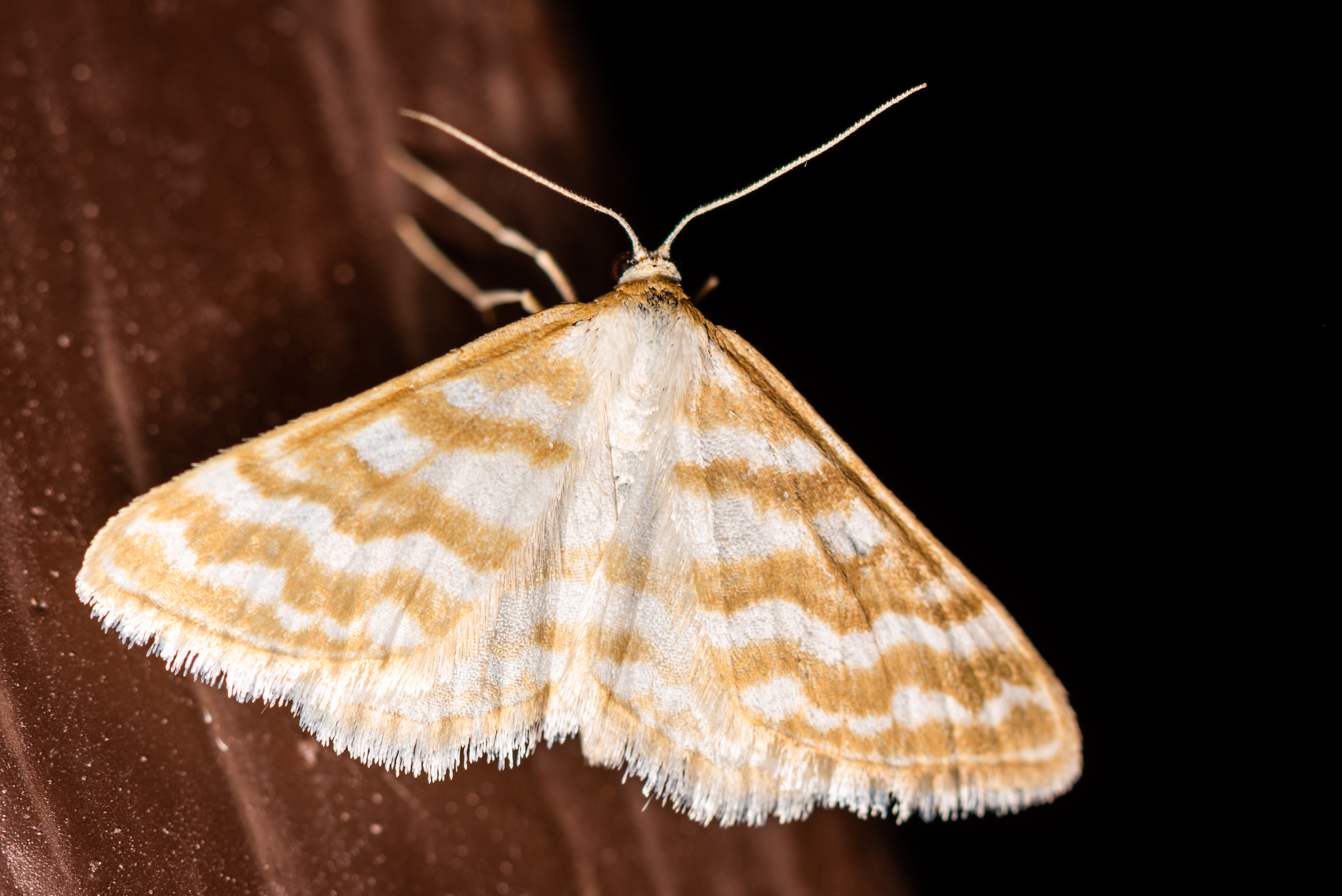

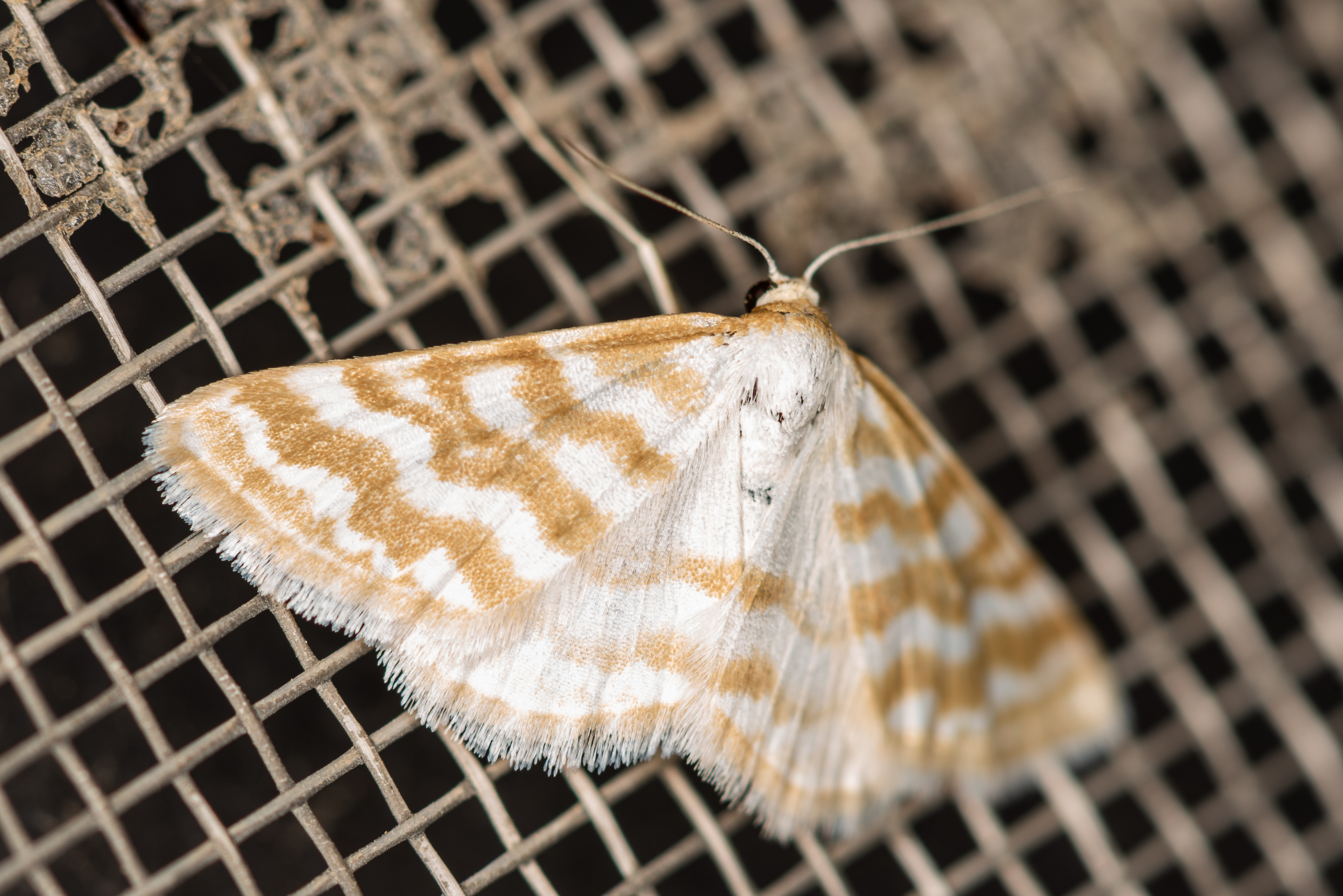

Scientific classification
- Domain: Eukaryota
- Kingdom: Animalia
- Phylum: Arthropoda
- Class: Insecta
- Order: Lepidoptera
- Family: Geometridae
- Genus: Scopula
- Species: S. ochraceata

Binomial name
- Scopula ochraceata (Staudinger, 1901)

Synonyms
- Acidalia ochraceata Staudinger, 1901

= Scopula ochraceata =

Species of geometer moth in subfamily Sterrhinae

Scopula ochraceata is a moth of the family Geometridae. It is found in Bulgaria, North Macedonia, Greece, Turkey, the Near East, southern Russia and Ukraine.
