= Scopula aequifasciata =

Scientific classification
- Domain: Eukaryota
- Kingdom: Animalia
- Phylum: Arthropoda
- Class: Insecta
- Order: Lepidoptera
- Family: Geometridae
- Genus: Scopula
- Species: S. aequifasciata

Binomial name
- Scopula aequifasciata (Christoph, 1881)

Synonyms
- Acidalia aequifasciata Christoph, 1881; Acidalia aequifasciaria Hedemann, 1881

Species of geometer moth in subfamily Sterrhinae

Scopula aequifasciata is a moth of the family Geometridae. It was described by Hugo Theodor Christoph in 1881. It is found in the Russian Far East.
