= Eupithecia indissolubilis =

Scientific classification
- Kingdom: Animalia
- Phylum: Arthropoda
- Clade: Pancrustacea
- Class: Insecta
- Order: Lepidoptera
- Family: Geometridae
- Genus: Eupithecia
- Species: E. indissolubilis

Binomial name
- Eupithecia indissolubilis Vojnits, 1979

Synonyms
- Eupithecia subita Vojnits, 1979; Eupithecia assa Mironov, 1989

Species of moth

Eupithecia indissolubilis is a moth in the family Geometridae. It is found in the Shaanxi province of China, and in parts of Russia (Southern Siberia). It has been found at altitudes between 1100 and 1700 meters. Adults are on wing from early June to early July.

Eupithecia indissolubilis has dark brownish grey forewings with minimal, dark markings in the shape of three costal spots, a discal dot and barely visible transverse lines. The hindwings are fuscous grey with a large, pale discal dot. The medial transverse line is darkened and evenly curved.
