= Scopula impersonata =

Scientific classification
- Kingdom: Animalia
- Phylum: Arthropoda
- Class: Insecta
- Order: Lepidoptera
- Family: Geometridae
- Genus: Scopula
- Species: S. impersonata

Binomial name
- Scopula impersonata (Walker, 1861)

Synonyms
- Acidalia impersonata Walker, 1861; Acidalia accurataria Christoph, 1881; Acidalia muscularia Staudinger, 1897; Acidalia macescens Butler, 1879

Species of geometer moth in subfamily Sterrhinae

Scopula impersonata is a moth of the family Geometridae. It is found in China, the Russian Far East, Taiwan and Japan.

The wingspan is 15–20 mm.

== Subspecies ==
- Scopula impersonata impersonata (China)
- Scopula impersonata accurataria (Christoph, 1881) (Siberia, Amur, Primorye)
- Scopula impersonata macescens (Butler, 1879) (Japan)
