= Scopula axiata =

Scientific classification
- Domain: Eukaryota
- Kingdom: Animalia
- Phylum: Arthropoda
- Class: Insecta
- Order: Lepidoptera
- Family: Geometridae
- Genus: Scopula
- Species: S. axiata

Binomial name
- Scopula axiata (Püngeler, 1909)

Synonyms
- Acidalia axiata Pungeler, 1909

Species of geometer moth in subfamily Sterrhinae

Scopula axiata is a moth of the family Geometridae. It was described by Püngeler in 1909. It is endemic to Russia.
