= Eupithecia pseudoicterata =

Scientific classification
- Domain: Eukaryota
- Kingdom: Animalia
- Phylum: Arthropoda
- Class: Insecta
- Order: Lepidoptera
- Family: Geometridae
- Genus: Eupithecia
- Species: E. pseudoicterata

Binomial name
- Eupithecia pseudoicterata Schütze, 1960

Species of moth

Eupithecia pseudoicterata is a moth in the family Geometridae. It is found in Iran and Russia (the Caucasus).
