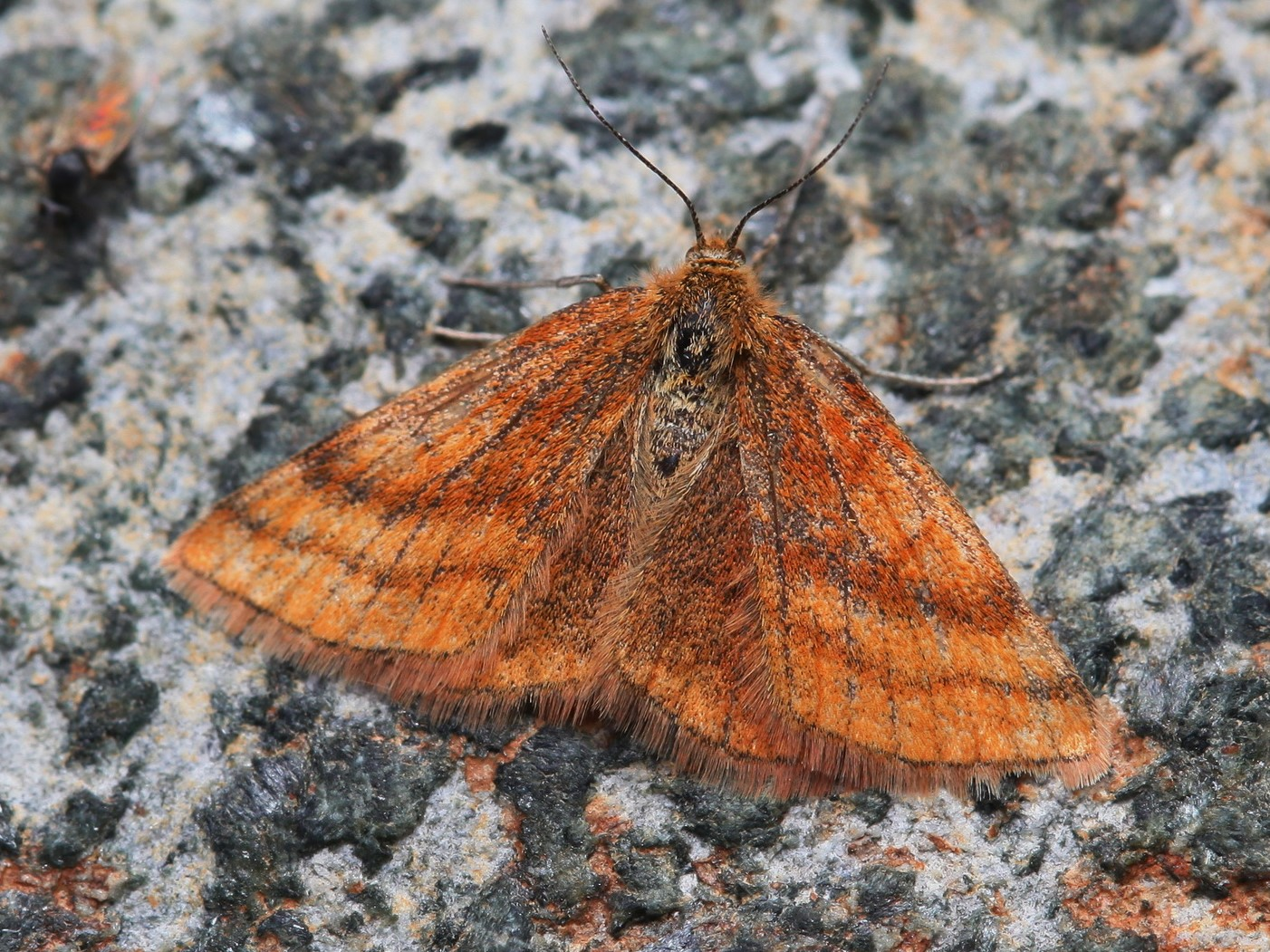
- S. sentinaria rufinaria

Scientific classification
- Kingdom: Animalia
- Phylum: Arthropoda
- Class: Insecta
- Order: Lepidoptera
- Family: Geometridae
- Genus: Scopula
- Species: S. sentinaria

Binomial name
- Scopula sentinaria (Geyer, 1837)

Synonyms
- Haematopis sentinaria Geyer, 1837; Holarctias sentinaria; Thamnonoma gracilior Butler, 1893; Aspilates spuraria Christoph, 1858; Acidalia rufinularia Staudinger, 1901; Acidalia rufinaria Staudinger, 1861; Holarctias rufinaria (Staudinger, 1861); Acidalia rufociliaria Bremer, 1864

= Scopula sentinaria =

Species of geometer moth in subfamily Sterrhinae

Scopula sentinaria is a species of moth of the family Geometridae. It is found from Alaska to Labrador, south in the prairies to southern Manitoba, Saskatchewan, Alberta and British Columbia. In the mountains it ranges south to Colorado. The species is also found in northern Russia and the Sayan Mountains. The habitat consists of dry shrubby clearings and edges.

The wingspan is 20–27 mm. Adults are on wing from early June to late July in one generation in North America.

Larvae have been reared on Polygonum aviculare. Fourth or fifth instar larvae overwinter.

== Subspecies ==
- Scopula sentinaria sentinaria - North America
- Scopula sentinaria rufinaria (Staudinger, 1861) - northern Russia
- Scopula sentinaria rufinularia (Staudinger, 1901) - Sayan Mountains
