= Eupithecia biornata =

Scientific classification
- Domain: Eukaryota
- Kingdom: Animalia
- Phylum: Arthropoda
- Class: Insecta
- Order: Lepidoptera
- Family: Geometridae
- Genus: Eupithecia
- Species: E. biornata

Binomial name
- Eupithecia biornata Christoph, 1867

Species of moth

Eupithecia biornata is a moth in the family Geometridae. It is found in Romania, Bulgaria, Greece, Ukraine and Russia, east to the Near East and the eastern Palearctic realm.

The wingspan is about 23 mm.
