= Eupithecia nobilitata =

Scientific classification
- Domain: Eukaryota
- Kingdom: Animalia
- Phylum: Arthropoda
- Class: Insecta
- Order: Lepidoptera
- Family: Geometridae
- Genus: Eupithecia
- Species: E. nobilitata

Binomial name
- Eupithecia nobilitata Staudinger, 1882

Synonyms
- Eupithecia nobiliata; Tephroclystia medionotata Warren, 1899

Species of moth

Eupithecia nobilitata is a moth in the family Geometridae. It is found in Russia (the South Siberian Mountains).
