= Eupithecia holti =

Scientific classification
- Domain: Eukaryota
- Kingdom: Animalia
- Phylum: Arthropoda
- Class: Insecta
- Order: Lepidoptera
- Family: Geometridae
- Genus: Eupithecia
- Species: E. holti

Binomial name
- Eupithecia holti Viidalepp, 1973

Species of moth

Eupithecia holti is a moth in the family Geometridae. It is found in Russia (the South Siberian Mountains).
