= Eupithecia subtacincta =

Scientific classification
- Kingdom: Animalia
- Phylum: Arthropoda
- Clade: Pancrustacea
- Class: Insecta
- Order: Lepidoptera
- Family: Geometridae
- Genus: Eupithecia
- Species: E. subtacincta

Binomial name
- Eupithecia subtacincta Hampson, 1895

Synonyms
- Eupithecia tabidaria Inoue, 1955; Eupithecia gozmanyi ussurii Vojnits, 1972; Eupithecia ussuri Vojnits, 1972; Eupithecia minibursae Vojnits, 1973

Species of moth

Eupithecia subtacincta is a moth in the family Geometridae. It is found in the Himalaya, from Jammu and Kashmir through China to the Russian Far East, Korea and Japan. It is also found from south-east Asia to Borneo.

The wingspan is about 12–15 mm.

Larvae have been reared on Clematis species and have also been reported feeding on Cornus controversa.
