= Eupithecia amplexata =

Scientific classification
- Domain: Eukaryota
- Kingdom: Animalia
- Phylum: Arthropoda
- Class: Insecta
- Order: Lepidoptera
- Family: Geometridae
- Genus: Eupithecia
- Species: E. amplexata

Binomial name
- Eupithecia amplexata Christoph, 1881

Species of moth

Eupithecia amplexata is a moth in the family Geometridae. It is found in China, Russia and Japan.

The wingspan is about 17–20 mm.

== Subspecies ==
- Eupithecia amplexata amplexata
- Eupithecia amplexata pryeriaria Leech, 1897
