= Eupithecia albidulata =

Scientific classification
- Domain: Eukaryota
- Kingdom: Animalia
- Phylum: Arthropoda
- Class: Insecta
- Order: Lepidoptera
- Family: Geometridae
- Genus: Eupithecia
- Species: E. albidulata

Binomial name
- Eupithecia albidulata Staudinger, 1892

Synonyms
- Eupithecia centricaucasica Alberti, 1969; Eupithecia postulata Vojnits, 1975

Species of moth

Eupithecia albidulata is a moth in the family Geometridae. It is found in the Caucasus.
