= Eupithecia bohatschi =

Scientific classification
- Domain: Eukaryota
- Kingdom: Animalia
- Phylum: Arthropoda
- Class: Insecta
- Order: Lepidoptera
- Family: Geometridae
- Genus: Eupithecia
- Species: E. bohatschi

Binomial name
- Eupithecia bohatschi Staudinger, 1897

Synonyms
- Eupithecia kawakamiana Matsumura, 1925; Eupithecia tuvinica Viidalepp, 1976

Species of moth

Eupithecia bohatschi is a moth in the family Geometridae first described by Otto Staudinger in 1897. It is found in Tuva, Transbaikalia, the Russian Far East, Mongolia, northern China and Korea.

The wingspan is about 18 mm.
