= Eupithecia praepupillata =

Scientific classification
- Domain: Eukaryota
- Kingdom: Animalia
- Phylum: Arthropoda
- Class: Insecta
- Order: Lepidoptera
- Family: Geometridae
- Genus: Eupithecia
- Species: E. praepupillata

Binomial name
- Eupithecia praepupillata Wehrli, 1927

Species of moth

Eupithecia praepupillata is a moth in the family Geometridae. It is found in Russia (southern Primorje) and Korea.

The wingspan is 18.5–23 mm. There is one generation per year with adults on wing from early September to late October. The species possibly overwinters as an egg.
