= Eupithecia bella =

Scientific classification
- Domain: Eukaryota
- Kingdom: Animalia
- Phylum: Arthropoda
- Class: Insecta
- Order: Lepidoptera
- Family: Geometridae
- Genus: Eupithecia
- Species: E. bella

Binomial name
- Eupithecia bella Staudinger, 1897

Species of moth

Eupithecia bella is a moth in the family Geometridae. It is found in Russia (Amur).
