= Eupithecia lacteolata =

Scientific classification
- Domain: Eukaryota
- Kingdom: Animalia
- Phylum: Arthropoda
- Class: Insecta
- Order: Lepidoptera
- Family: Geometridae
- Genus: Eupithecia
- Species: E. lacteolata

Binomial name
- Eupithecia lacteolata Dietze, 1906

Synonyms
- Eupithecia sublacteolata Wehrli, 1929

Species of moth

Eupithecia lacteolata is a moth in the family Geometridae. It is found in Russia and Turkey.
