= Scopula permutata =

Scientific classification
- Domain: Eukaryota
- Kingdom: Animalia
- Phylum: Arthropoda
- Class: Insecta
- Order: Lepidoptera
- Family: Geometridae
- Genus: Scopula
- Species: S. permutata

Binomial name
- Scopula permutata (Staudinger, 1897)

Synonyms
- Acidalia permutata Staudinger, 1897; Acidalia gnophosaria Leech, 1897

Species of geometer moth in subfamily Sterrhinae

Scopula permutata is a moth of the family Geometridae. It is found in Mongolia, Russia and Tibet.
