= Eupithecia habermani =

Scientific classification
- Kingdom: Animalia
- Phylum: Arthropoda
- Clade: Pancrustacea
- Class: Insecta
- Order: Lepidoptera
- Family: Geometridae
- Genus: Eupithecia
- Species: E. habermani

Binomial name
- Eupithecia habermani Viidalepp & Mironov, 1988

Species of moth

Eupithecia habermani is a moth in the family Geometridae first described by Jaan Viidalepp and Vladimir Mironov in 1988. It is found in the Russian Far East.

The wingspan is 21.5–22 mm. Adults are on wing in August.
