= Eupithecia vaticina =

Scientific classification
- Kingdom: Animalia
- Phylum: Arthropoda
- Clade: Pancrustacea
- Class: Insecta
- Order: Lepidoptera
- Family: Geometridae
- Genus: Eupithecia
- Species: E. vaticina

Binomial name
- Eupithecia vaticina Vojnits, 1982

Synonyms
- Eupithecia vacitina

Species of moth

Eupithecia vaticina is a moth in the family Geometridae which is endemic to Dagestan.
