= Scopula arenosaria =

Scientific classification
- Domain: Eukaryota
- Kingdom: Animalia
- Phylum: Arthropoda
- Class: Insecta
- Order: Lepidoptera
- Family: Geometridae
- Genus: Scopula
- Species: S. arenosaria

Binomial name
- Scopula arenosaria (Staudinger, 1879)

Synonyms
- Acidalia arenosaria Staudinger 1879

Species of geometer moth in subfamily Sterrhinae

Scopula arenosaria is a moth of the family Geometridae. It was described by Staudinger in 1879. It is found in south-eastern Russia.

The wingspan is 21–22 millimetres (0.83–0.87 in).
