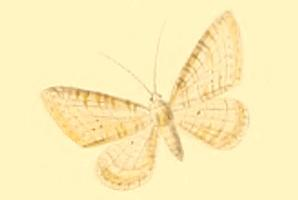

Scientific classification
- Domain: Eukaryota
- Kingdom: Animalia
- Phylum: Arthropoda
- Class: Insecta
- Order: Lepidoptera
- Family: Geometridae
- Genus: Eupithecia
- Species: E. fuscicostata

Binomial name
- Eupithecia fuscicostata Christoph, 1887

Synonyms
- Eupithecia domogledana Vojnits & Szabo, 1988; Eupithecia salami Brandt, 1938

= Eupithecia fuscicostata =

Species of moth

Eupithecia fuscicostata is a moth in the family Geometridae. It is found in Romania, North Macedonia and Greece, as well as the Near East and Iran.
