= Eupithecia consortaria =

Scientific classification
- Domain: Eukaryota
- Kingdom: Animalia
- Phylum: Arthropoda
- Class: Insecta
- Order: Lepidoptera
- Family: Geometridae
- Genus: Eupithecia
- Species: E. consortaria

Binomial name
- Eupithecia consortaria Leech, 1897

Synonyms
- Eupithecia pacifica Inoue, 1980

Species of moth

Eupithecia consortaria is a moth in the family Geometridae. It is found in Russia, Japan and Korea.

The wingspan is about 18 mm.
