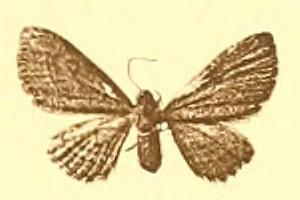

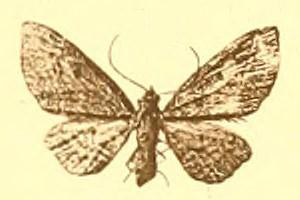

Scientific classification
- Domain: Eukaryota
- Kingdom: Animalia
- Phylum: Arthropoda
- Class: Insecta
- Order: Lepidoptera
- Family: Geometridae
- Genus: Eupithecia
- Species: E. barteli

Binomial name
- Eupithecia barteli Dietze, 1908

Synonyms
- Eupithecia artshae Viidalepp, 1988

= Eupithecia barteli =

Species of moth

Eupithecia barteli is a moth in the family Geometridae. It is found in Afghanistan, the southeastern part of European Russia, north-western Kazakhstan, Tajikistan, Nepal, India (Himachal Pradesh) and China (Shaanxi, Yunnan).

The wingspan is about 17 mm.
