= Eupithecia proterva =

Scientific classification
- Domain: Eukaryota
- Kingdom: Animalia
- Phylum: Arthropoda
- Class: Insecta
- Order: Lepidoptera
- Family: Geometridae
- Genus: Eupithecia
- Species: E. proterva

Binomial name
- Eupithecia proterva Butler, 1878

Species of moth

Eupithecia proterva is a moth in the family Geometridae. It is found in Russia, Japan, Taiwan and Korea.

The wingspan is about 16–20 mm. Adults are on wing from March to May in one generation per year.

The larvae feed on Acer mono, Quercus mongolica and Viburnum plicatum.
