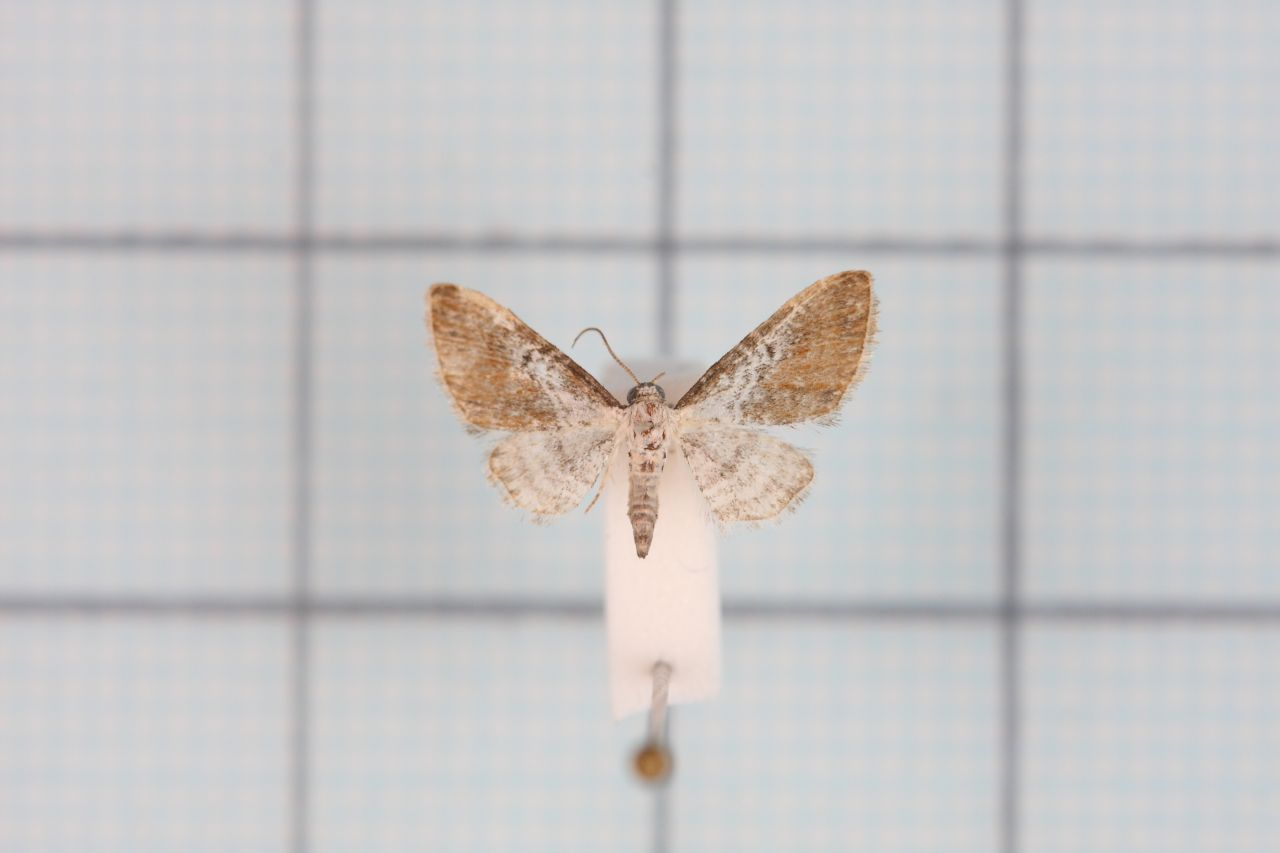

Scientific classification
- Kingdom: Animalia
- Phylum: Arthropoda
- Clade: Pancrustacea
- Class: Insecta
- Order: Lepidoptera
- Family: Geometridae
- Genus: Eupithecia
- Species: E. jezonica

Binomial name
- Eupithecia jezonica Matsumura, 1927

Synonyms
- Eupithecia viidaleppi Vojnits, 1981; Eupithecia catosophia Inoue, 1988

= Eupithecia jezonica =

Species of moth

Eupithecia jezonica is a moth in the family Geometridae. It is found in Asia, including India and Nepal. It has also been recorded from Kazakhstan, the Russian Far East and Korea, Japan and Taiwan.

The wingspan is about 20 mm.
