= Scopula apicipunctata =

Scientific classification
- Domain: Eukaryota
- Kingdom: Animalia
- Phylum: Arthropoda
- Class: Insecta
- Order: Lepidoptera
- Family: Geometridae
- Genus: Scopula
- Species: S. apicipunctata

Binomial name
- Scopula apicipunctata (Christoph, 1881)

Synonyms
- Acidalia apicipunctata Christoph, 1881; Acidalia arenaria Leech, 1897

Species of geometer moth in subfamily Sterrhinae

Scopula apicipunctata is a moth of the family Geometridae. It was described by Hugo Theodor Christoph in 1881. It is found in Siberia, the Kuriles and Japan.

The wingspan is 15–24 millimetres (0.59–0.94 in).
