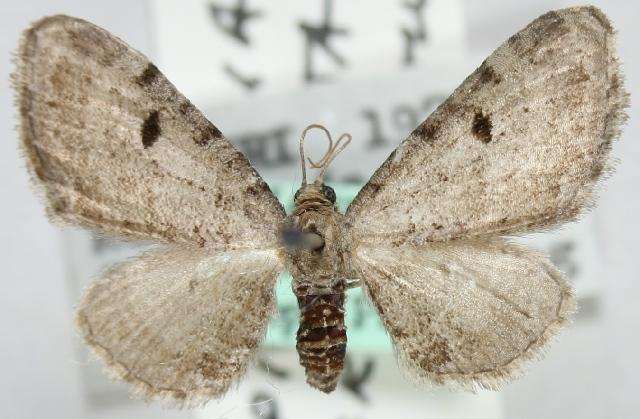

Scientific classification
- Kingdom: Animalia
- Phylum: Arthropoda
- Class: Insecta
- Order: Lepidoptera
- Family: Geometridae
- Genus: Eupithecia
- Species: E. interpunctaria

Binomial name
- Eupithecia interpunctaria Inoue, 1979

= Eupithecia interpunctaria =

Species of moth

Eupithecia interpunctaria is a moth in the family Geometridae. It is found in Russia, Japan and Taiwan.
