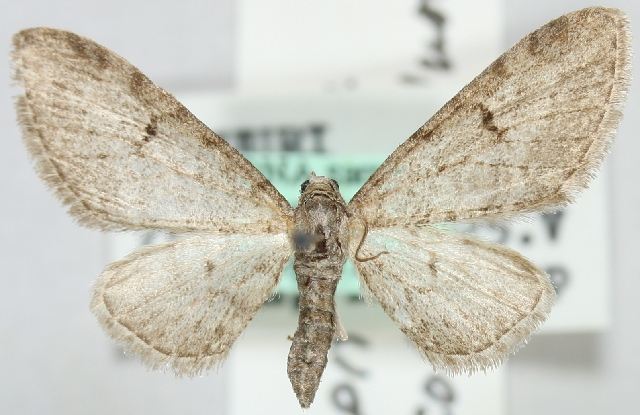

Scientific classification
- Domain: Eukaryota
- Kingdom: Animalia
- Phylum: Arthropoda
- Class: Insecta
- Order: Lepidoptera
- Family: Geometridae
- Genus: Eupithecia
- Species: E. quadripunctata

Binomial name
- Eupithecia quadripunctata Warren, 1888

Synonyms
- Eupithecia tricornuta Inoue, 1988; Eupithecia abiecta Vojnits, 1980

= Eupithecia quadripunctata =

Species of moth

Eupithecia quadripunctata is a moth in the family Geometridae. It is found in India, Pakistan, Nepal, Russia, China (Shanxi, Shaanxi, Gansu, Hebei, Henan, Heilongjiang), Taiwan, Korea, Japan and northern Thailand.

The wingspan is about 15–25 millimetres (0.59–0.98 in). There are two generations per year. The aestival brood is much smaller than the vernal brood.
