= Scopula immistaria =

Scientific classification
- Domain: Eukaryota
- Kingdom: Animalia
- Phylum: Arthropoda
- Class: Insecta
- Order: Lepidoptera
- Family: Geometridae
- Genus: Scopula
- Species: S. immistaria

Binomial name
- Scopula immistaria (Herrich-Schäffer, 1852)

Synonyms
- Acidalia immistaria Herrich-Schäffer, 1852

Species of geometer moth in subfamily Sterrhinae

Scopula immistaria is a moth of the family Geometridae. It is found in Bulgaria, Ukraine and Russia.

== Subspecies ==
- Scopula immistaria immistaria
- Scopula immistaria beshkovi Gelbrecht & Hausmann, 1997 (Bulgaria)
