= Scopula astheniata =

Scientific classification
- Domain: Eukaryota
- Kingdom: Animalia
- Phylum: Arthropoda
- Class: Insecta
- Order: Lepidoptera
- Family: Geometridae
- Genus: Scopula
- Species: S. astheniata

Binomial name
- Scopula astheniata Viidalepp, 2005

Species of geometer moth in subfamily Sterrhinae

Scopula astheniata is a moth of the family Geometridae first described by Viidalepp in 2005. It is endemic to Russia.
