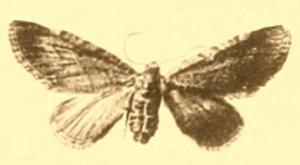

Scientific classification
- Kingdom: Animalia
- Phylum: Arthropoda
- Clade: Pancrustacea
- Class: Insecta
- Order: Lepidoptera
- Family: Geometridae
- Genus: Eupithecia
- Species: E. moecha

Binomial name
- Eupithecia moecha Dietze, 1902

Synonyms
- Eupithecia magnifica Vojnits & Laever, 1973

= Eupithecia moecha =

Species of moth

Eupithecia moecha is a moth in the family Geometridae. It is found in the southeastern part of European Russia and north-western Kazakhstan.
