= Eupithecia carpophilata =

Scientific classification
- Kingdom: Animalia
- Phylum: Arthropoda
- Class: Insecta
- Order: Lepidoptera
- Family: Geometridae
- Genus: Eupithecia
- Species: E. carpophilata

Binomial name
- Eupithecia carpophilata Staudinger, 1897

Synonyms
- Eupithecia carpophilata var. collega Dietze, 1908

Species of moth

Eupithecia carpophilata is a moth in the family Geometridae. It is found in Russia (Siberia) and India (Himachal Pradesh).
