= Scopula albiceraria =

Scientific classification
- Domain: Eukaryota
- Kingdom: Animalia
- Phylum: Arthropoda
- Class: Insecta
- Order: Lepidoptera
- Family: Geometridae
- Genus: Scopula
- Species: S. albiceraria

Binomial name
- Scopula albiceraria (Herrich-Schäffer, 1847)

Synonyms
- Acidalia albiceraria Herrich-Schaffer, 1847; Acidalia sulphuraria Freyer, 1847; Acidalia vitellinaria Eversmann, 1851; Acidalia mannerheimatia Erschoff, 1871

Species of geometer moth in subfamily Sterrhinae

Scopula albiceraria is a moth of the family Geometridae. It was described by Gottlieb August Wilhelm Herrich-Schäffer in 1847. It is found in Transcaucasia and Siberia.

== Subspecies ==
- Scopula albiceraria albiceraria
- Scopula albiceraria vitellinaria (Eversmann, 1851)
