= Scopula agutsaensis =

Scientific classification
- Domain: Eukaryota
- Kingdom: Animalia
- Phylum: Arthropoda
- Class: Insecta
- Order: Lepidoptera
- Family: Geometridae
- Genus: Scopula
- Species: S. agutsaensis

Binomial name
- Scopula agutsaensis Vasilenko, 1997

Species of geometer moth in subfamily Sterrhinae

Scopula agutsaensis is a moth of the family Geometridae. It was described by Vasilenko in 1997. It is found in Russia (Transbaikal).
