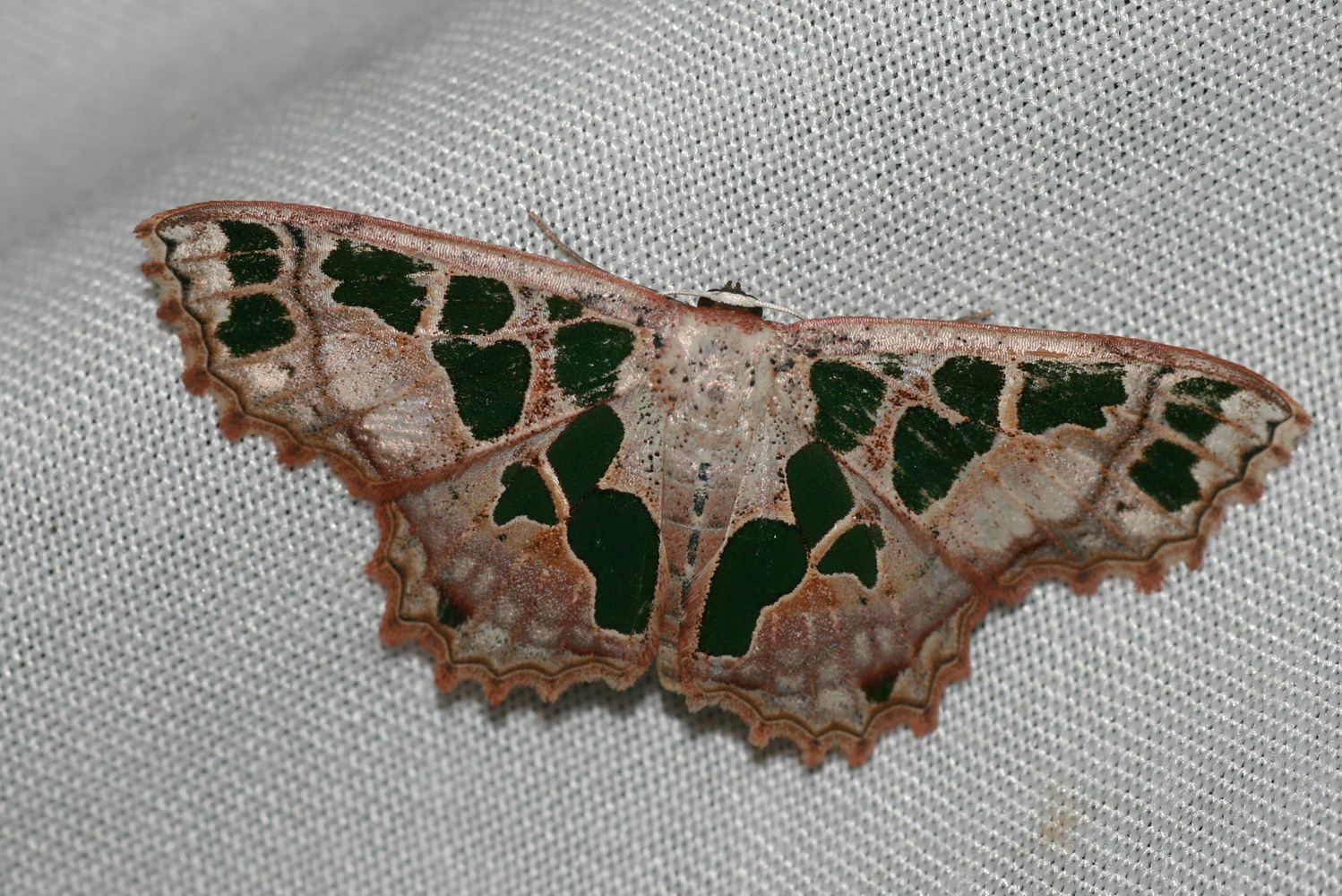

Scientific classification
- Kingdom: Animalia
- Phylum: Arthropoda
- Class: Insecta
- Order: Lepidoptera
- Family: Geometridae
- Genus: Scopula
- Species: S. divisaria

Binomial name
- Scopula divisaria (Walker, 1861)

Synonyms
- Macaria divisaria Walker, 1861; Trygodes divisaria; Antitrygodes divisaria

= Scopula divisaria =

Species of geometer moth in subfamily Sterrhinae

Scopula divisaria is a moth of the family Geometridae. It is found from the Indian subregion, Sri Lanka to Taiwan and Sulawesi.

== Description ==
Its wingspan is about 40 mm. Both wings with highly crenulate outer margin and produced to points at all the veins except vein 5. It is a greyish moth with slightly fuscous irrorations (sprinkles) and a violaceous tinge. Frons blackish. Vertex of head whitish. Forewings with rufous costa. A bright verditer-greenish sub-basal patch found below cell and spot above it in cell and spot above it in cell. There is a quadrate patch found in end of cell another from below it to inner margin, and one beyond cell, a slightly sinuous dark postmedial line terminating at outer angle in a crimson mark. Two large quadrate green sub-apical patches can be seen. Hindwings with large quadrate green patch in cell, another below cell extending to inner margin and to near anal angle. a trilobate patch found beyond cell. Outer area purplish, with some red beyond the green patches. A sinuous postmedial medial line terminating in a crimson line at anal angle, A crimson subapical line and spot. Both wings with dark marginal line can be seen. Ventral side is pale, mostly with fuscous suffusion.

== Subspecies ==
- Scopula divisaria divisaria
- Scopula divisaria perturbata (Prout, 1914) (Taiwan)
- Scopula divisaria virentiplaga (Prout, 1938) (Sri Lanka)
