= Eupithecia leptogrammata =

Scientific classification
- Domain: Eukaryota
- Kingdom: Animalia
- Phylum: Arthropoda
- Class: Insecta
- Order: Lepidoptera
- Family: Geometridae
- Genus: Eupithecia
- Species: E. leptogrammata

Binomial name
- Eupithecia leptogrammata Staudinger,1882

Synonyms
- Eupithecia melanochroa Wehrli, 1927

Species of moth

Eupithecia leptogrammata is a moth in the family Geometridae. It is found in Russia.
