= Scopula orientalis =

Scientific classification
- Domain: Eukaryota
- Kingdom: Animalia
- Phylum: Arthropoda
- Class: Insecta
- Order: Lepidoptera
- Family: Geometridae
- Genus: Scopula
- Species: S. orientalis

Binomial name
- Scopula orientalis (Alphéraky, 1876)

Synonyms
- Acidalia orientalis Alphéraky, 1876; Scopula decorata ab. magna Prout, 1913

Species of geometer moth in subfamily Sterrhinae

Scopula orientalis is a moth of the family Geometridae. It was described by Sergei Alphéraky in 1876. It is found in Bulgaria, North Macedonia, Ukraine, Russia, Turkey and Korea.
