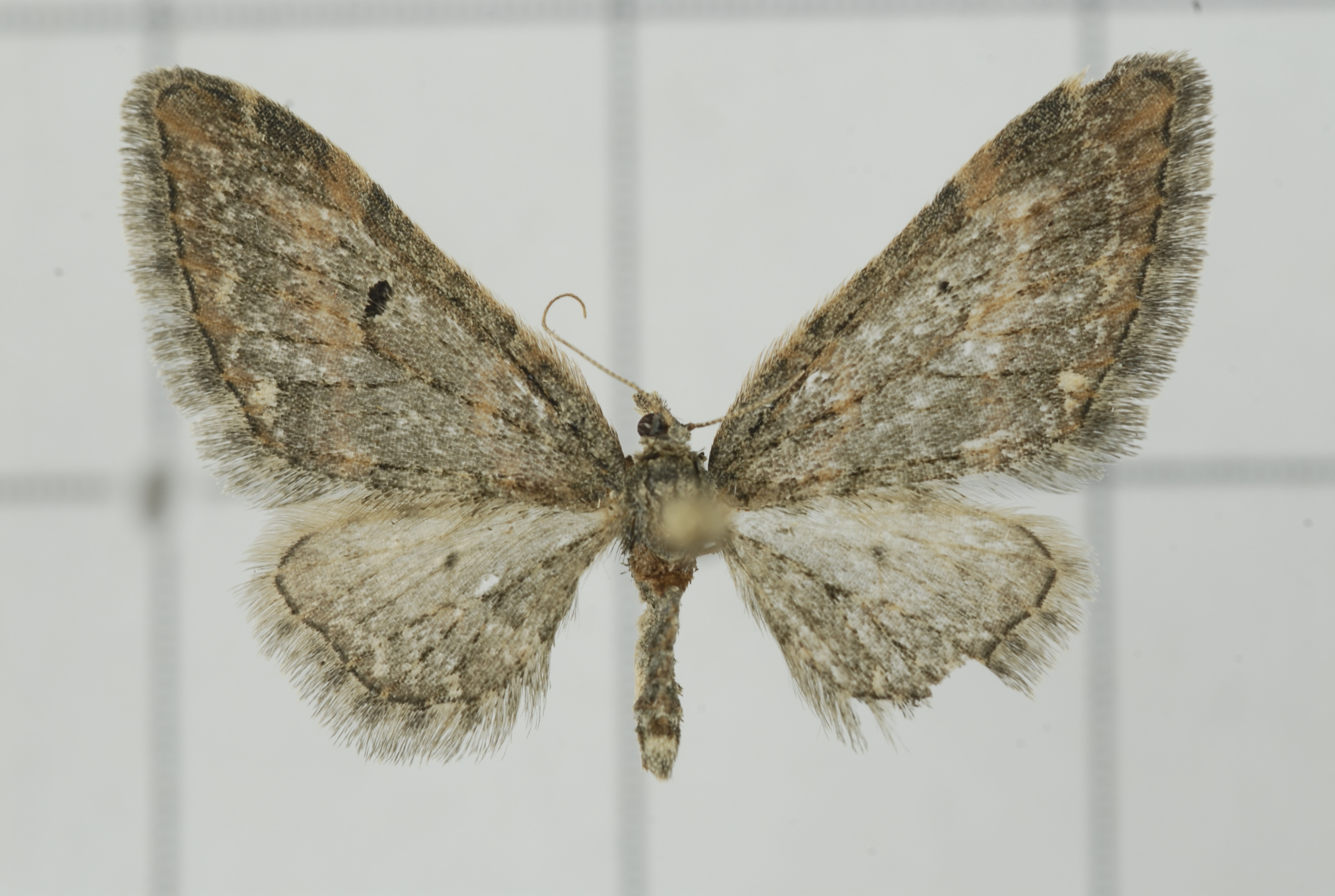

Scientific classification
- Kingdom: Animalia
- Phylum: Arthropoda
- Class: Insecta
- Order: Lepidoptera
- Family: Geometridae
- Genus: Eupithecia
- Species: E. clavifera

Binomial name
- Eupithecia clavifera Inoue, 1955

Synonyms
- Eupithecia breviclava Inoue, 1988

= Eupithecia clavifera =

Species of moth

Eupithecia clavifera is a moth in the family Geometridae. It is found in Russia, China, Japan, Taiwan and Korea.

The wingspan is about 15–19 mm. Adults are on wing from March to May in one generation per year.

The larvae feed on Cornus controversa.
