= Eupithecia tribunaria =

Scientific classification
- Domain: Eukaryota
- Kingdom: Animalia
- Phylum: Arthropoda
- Class: Insecta
- Order: Lepidoptera
- Family: Geometridae
- Genus: Eupithecia
- Species: E. tribunaria

Binomial name
- Eupithecia tribunaria Herrich-Schaffer, 1852

Species of moth

Eupithecia tribunaria is a moth in the family Geometridae. It was first recorded in Elizabethpol, which was then in the Russian Empire and is now part of Azerbaijan.
