= Eupithecia recens =

Scientific classification
- Domain: Eukaryota
- Kingdom: Animalia
- Phylum: Arthropoda
- Class: Insecta
- Order: Lepidoptera
- Family: Geometridae
- Genus: Eupithecia
- Species: E. recens

Binomial name
- Eupithecia recens Dietze, 1903

Synonyms
- Eupithecia creta Dietze, 1908

Species of moth

Eupithecia recens is a moth in the family Geometridae. It is found in Russia (the South Siberian Mountains) and Kyrgyzstan.
