= Scopula dignata =

Scientific classification
- Domain: Eukaryota
- Kingdom: Animalia
- Phylum: Arthropoda
- Class: Insecta
- Order: Lepidoptera
- Family: Geometridae
- Genus: Scopula
- Species: S. dignata

Binomial name
- Scopula dignata (Guenée, [1858])

Synonyms
- Acidalia dignata Guenée, 1858

Species of geometer moth in subfamily Sterrhinae

Scopula dignata is a moth of the family Geometridae. It is endemic to Russia.
