= Eupithecia persuastrix =

Scientific classification
- Kingdom: Animalia
- Phylum: Arthropoda
- Clade: Pancrustacea
- Class: Insecta
- Order: Lepidoptera
- Family: Geometridae
- Genus: Eupithecia
- Species: E. persuastrix

Binomial name
- Eupithecia persuastrix Mironov, 1990

Species of moth

Eupithecia persuastrix is a moth in the family Geometridae. It is found in the Russian Far East.
