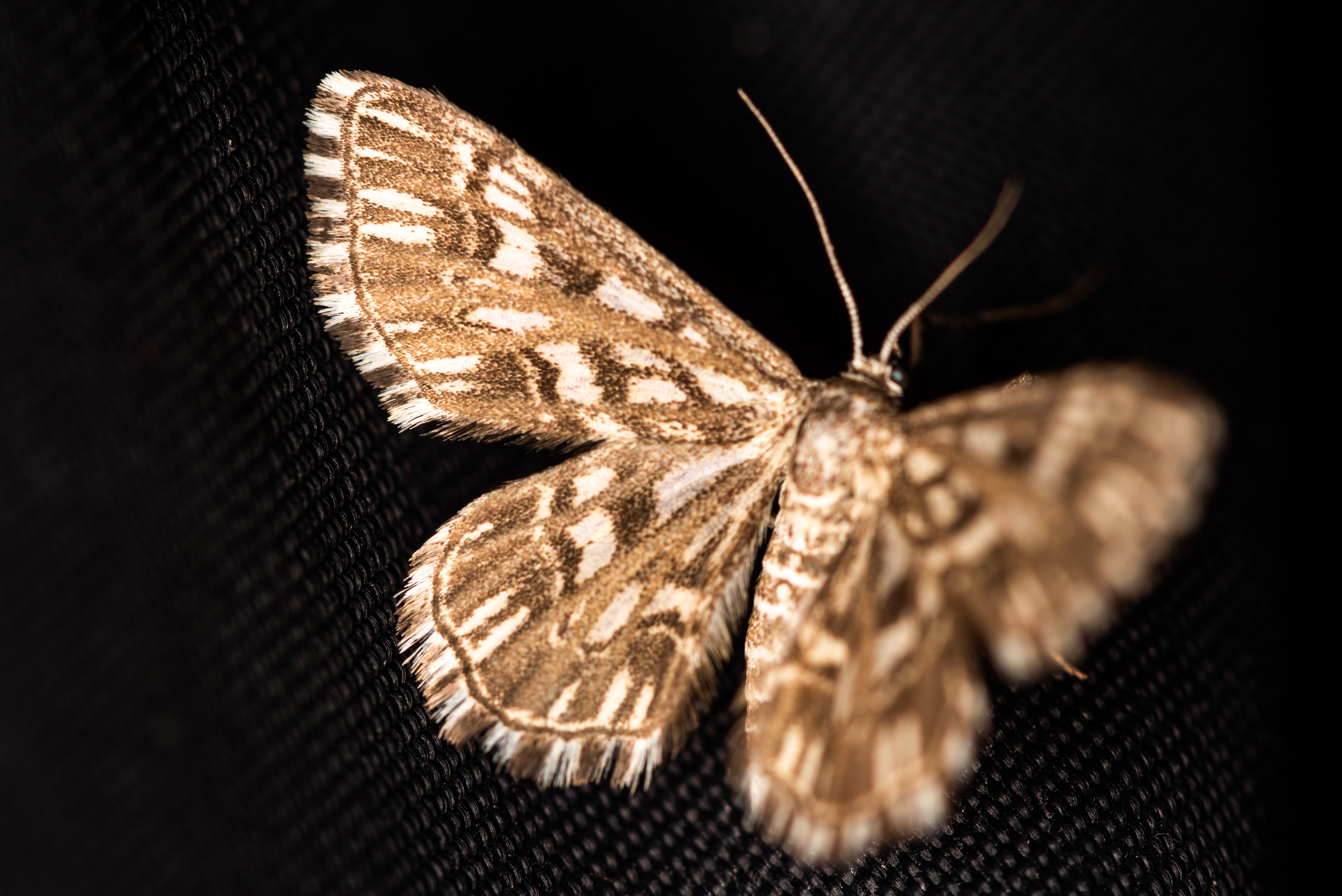

Scientific classification
- Domain: Eukaryota
- Kingdom: Animalia
- Phylum: Arthropoda
- Class: Insecta
- Order: Lepidoptera
- Family: Geometridae
- Genus: Scopula
- Species: S. humifusaria

Binomial name
- Scopula humifusaria (Eversmann, 1837)

Synonyms
- Fidonia humifusaria Eversmann, 1837; Cinglis humifusaria

= Scopula humifusaria =

Species of geometer moth in subfamily Sterrhinae

Scopula humifusaria is a moth of the family Geometridae. It is found in Russia, Turkey, Turkmenistan, Kyrgyzstan and Kazakhstan.
