= Scopula vojnitsi =

Scientific classification
- Kingdom: Animalia
- Phylum: Arthropoda
- Class: Insecta
- Order: Lepidoptera
- Family: Geometridae
- Genus: Scopula
- Species: S. vojnitsi

Binomial name
- Scopula vojnitsi Inoue, 1992

Species of geometer moth in subfamily Sterrhinae

Scopula vojnitsi is a moth of the family Geometridae. It is found in Korea and the Russian Far East.
