= Scopula asthena =

Scientific classification
- Kingdom: Animalia
- Phylum: Arthropoda
- Class: Insecta
- Order: Lepidoptera
- Family: Geometridae
- Genus: Scopula
- Species: S. asthena

Binomial name
- Scopula asthena Inoue, 1943

Species of geometer moth in subfamily Sterrhinae

Scopula asthena is a moth of the family Geometridae. It was described by Hiroshi Inoue in 1943. It is found in Japan, north-eastern China and south-eastern Russia.
