= Eupithecia arenbergeri =

Scientific classification
- Domain: Eukaryota
- Kingdom: Animalia
- Phylum: Arthropoda
- Class: Insecta
- Order: Lepidoptera
- Family: Geometridae
- Genus: Eupithecia
- Species: E. arenbergeri

Binomial name
- Eupithecia arenbergeri Pinker, 1976

Species of moth

Eupithecia arenbergeri is a moth in the family Geometridae. It is found in Russia and Turkey.
