= Eupithecia neosatyrata =

Scientific classification
- Kingdom: Animalia
- Phylum: Arthropoda
- Class: Insecta
- Order: Lepidoptera
- Family: Geometridae
- Genus: Eupithecia
- Species: E. neosatyrata

Binomial name
- Eupithecia neosatyrata Inoue, 1979

Species of moth

Eupithecia neosatyrata is a moth in the family Geometridae. It is found in Japan.
