= Eupithecia vitiosata =

Scientific classification
- Kingdom: Animalia
- Phylum: Arthropoda
- Clade: Pancrustacea
- Class: Insecta
- Order: Lepidoptera
- Family: Geometridae
- Genus: Eupithecia
- Species: E. vitiosata

Binomial name
- Eupithecia vitiosata Mironov, 2001

Species of moth

Eupithecia vitiosata is a moth in the family Geometridae first described by Vladimir Mironov in 2001. It is found in Russia (East & West Causcasia).
