= Eupithecia amasina =

Scientific classification
- Kingdom: Animalia
- Phylum: Arthropoda
- Clade: Pancrustacea
- Class: Insecta
- Order: Lepidoptera
- Family: Geometridae
- Genus: Eupithecia
- Species: E. amasina

Binomial name
- Eupithecia amasina Bohatsch, 1893

Synonyms
- Eupithecia dinaria Vardikjan, 1985

Species of moth

Eupithecia amasina is a moth in the family Geometridae first described by Otto Bohatsch in 1893. It is found in Russia Turkey, Lebanon and Syria.
