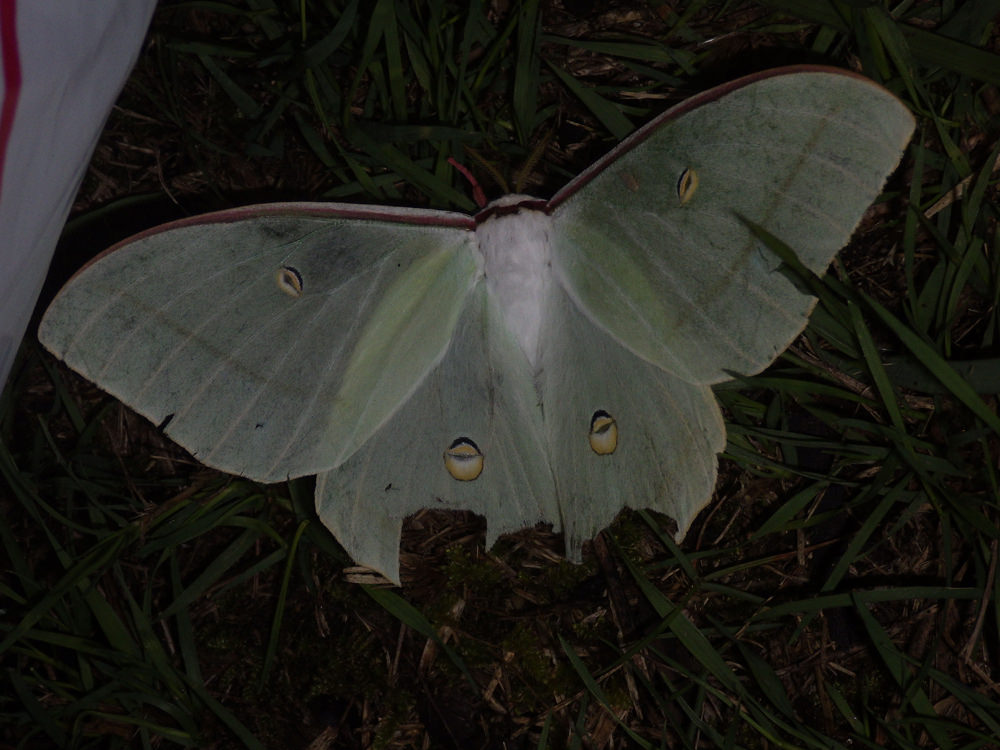

Scientific classification
- Domain: Eukaryota
- Kingdom: Animalia
- Phylum: Arthropoda
- Class: Insecta
- Order: Lepidoptera
- Family: Saturniidae
- Genus: Actias
- Species: A. gnoma

Binomial name
- Actias gnoma (Butler, 1877)

Synonyms
- Tropaea gnoma Butler, 1877; Actias artemis tomariactias Bryk, 1942

= Actias gnoma =

Species of moth

Actias gnoma, also known as the Japanese moon moth, is a moth in the family Saturniidae The species was first described by Arthur Gardiner Butler in 1877. It is found in Japan and the Russian Far East.

== Subspecies ==
- Actias gnoma gnoma (Butler, 1877)
- Actias gnoma mandschurica (Staudinger, 1892)
- Actias gnoma miyatai Inoue, 1976 (Japan: Hachijō-jima)
