= Scopula supernivearia =

Scientific classification
- Kingdom: Animalia
- Phylum: Arthropoda
- Class: Insecta
- Order: Lepidoptera
- Family: Geometridae
- Genus: Scopula
- Species: S. supernivearia

Binomial name
- Scopula supernivearia Inoue, 1963

Species of geometer moth in subfamily Sterrhinae

Scopula supernivearia is a moth of the family Geometridae. It was described by Inouein 1963. It is found in Japan and on the Kuriles.
