= Scopula disclusaria =

Scientific classification
- Kingdom: Animalia
- Phylum: Arthropoda
- Class: Insecta
- Order: Lepidoptera
- Family: Geometridae
- Genus: Scopula
- Species: S. disclusaria

Binomial name
- Scopula disclusaria (Christoph, 1881)

Synonyms
- Acidalia disclusaria Christoph, 1881

Species of geometer moth in subfamily Sterrhinae

Scopula disclusaria is a moth of the family Geometridae. It was described by Hugo Theodor Christoph in 1881. It is found in the Russian Far East and Korea.
