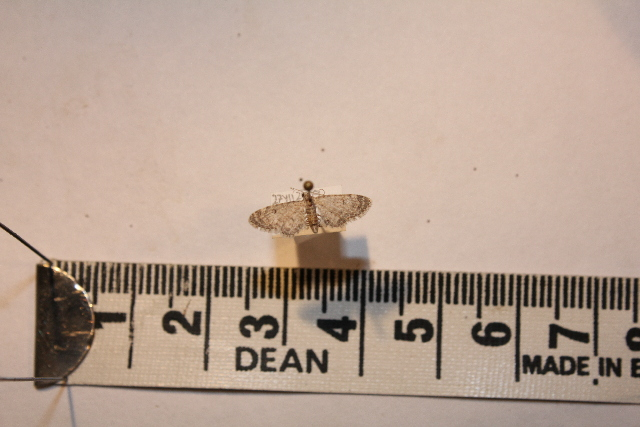

Scientific classification
- Kingdom: Animalia
- Phylum: Arthropoda
- Clade: Pancrustacea
- Class: Insecta
- Order: Lepidoptera
- Family: Geometridae
- Genus: Eupithecia
- Species: E. minusculata

Binomial name
- Eupithecia minusculata Alphéraky, 1883

Synonyms
- Eupithecia penultimaria Wiltshire, 1985; Eupithecia herrenschmidti Mentzer & Moberg, 1992

= Eupithecia minusculata =

Species of moth

Eupithecia minusculata is a moth in the family Geometridae. It is a widespread species, ranging from Spain through North Africa (Algeria, Tunisia and Libya) and the Middle East to Mongolia. In the north, the range extends to the lower part of the River Volga. In Central Asia, it is found in Turkmenistan, Uzbekistan, Tajikistan, Afghanistan, southern Kazakhstan, and north-western China (Xinjiang). The habitat consists of deserts or xerophilous areas.

The wingspan is about 13–15 mm.
