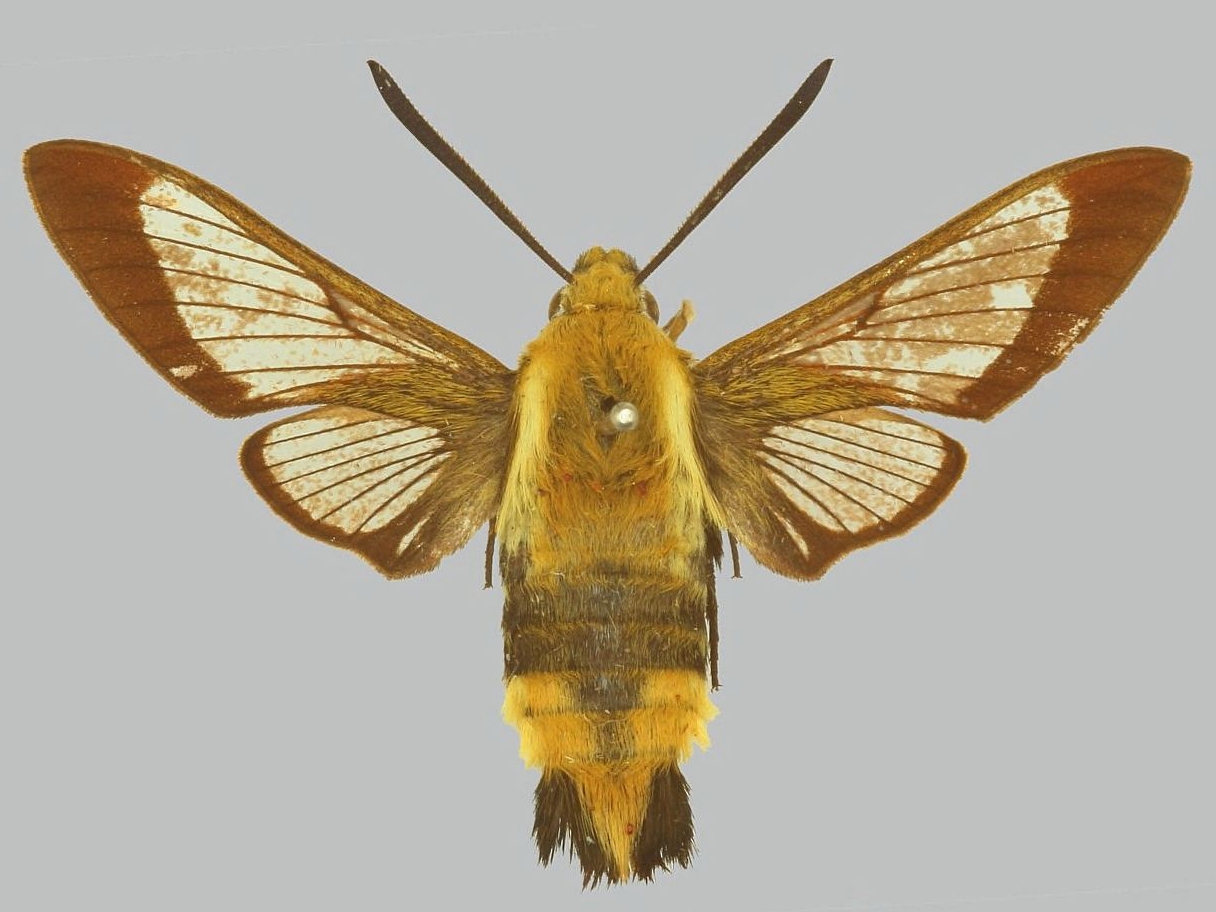

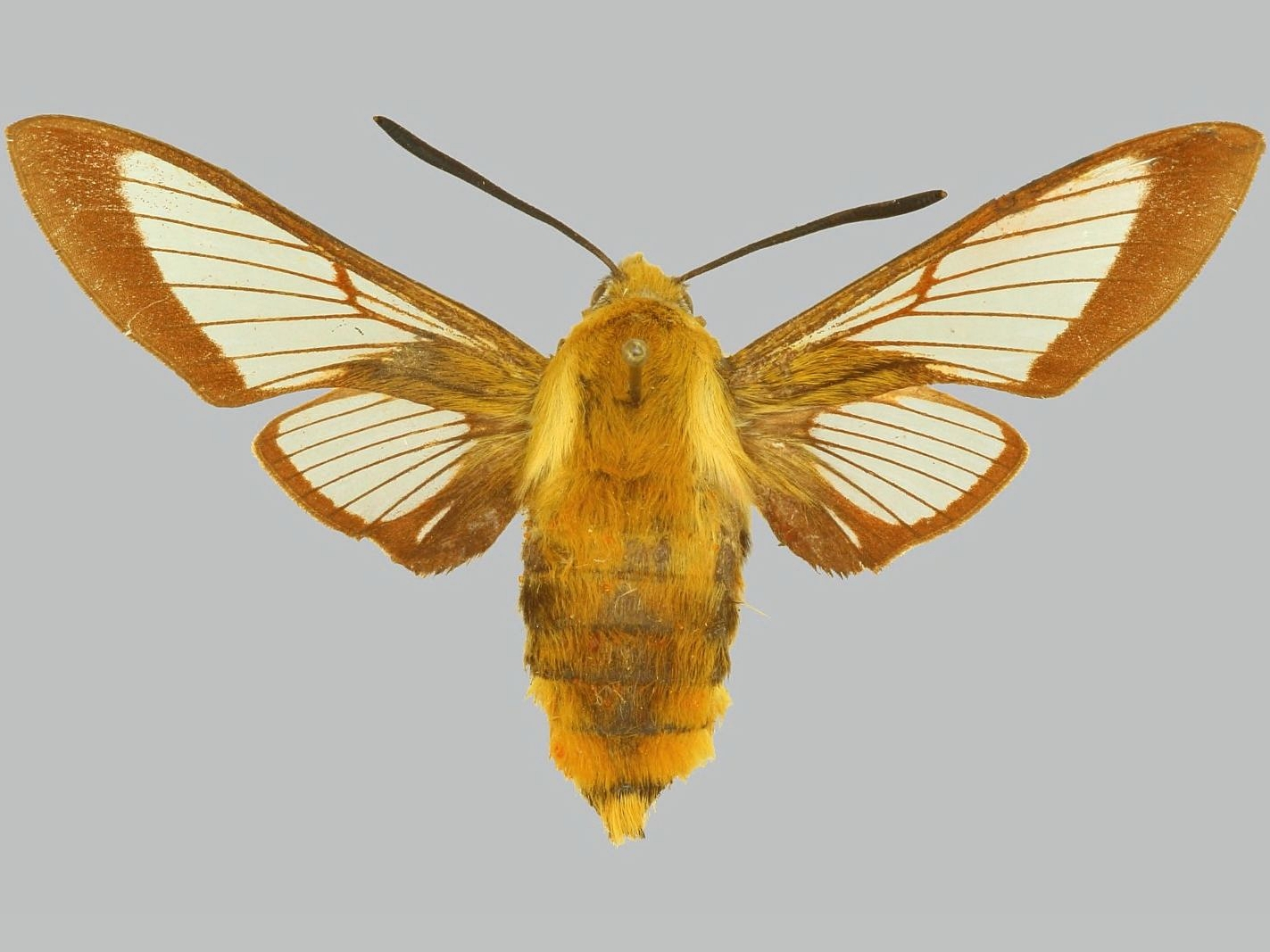
- male and female

Scientific classification
- Domain: Eukaryota
- Kingdom: Animalia
- Phylum: Arthropoda
- Class: Insecta
- Order: Lepidoptera
- Family: Sphingidae
- Genus: Hemaris
- Species: H. affinis

Binomial name
- Hemaris affinis (Bremer, 1861)

Synonyms
- Macroglossa affinis Bremer, 1861; Macroglossa confinis Staudinger, 1892; Macroglossa ganssuensis Grum-Grshimailo, 1891; Macroglossa sieboldi Boisduval, 1869; Sesia alternata Butler, 1874; Sesia whitelyi Butler, 1874

= Hemaris affinis =

Honeysuckle bee hawkmoth

Species of moth

Hemaris affinis, the honeysuckle bee hawkmoth, is a moth of the family Sphingidae. It is known from Mongolia, the Russian Far East, northern, central and eastern China, Taiwan, North Korea, South Korea and Japan.

The wingspan is 43–54 mm. There are two generations per year in northern China, with adults on wing from May to late August. In Korea, adults have been recorded from early May to early November.

The larvae have been recorded feeding on Lonicera maackii in the Russian Far East and China, as well as Lonicera japonica and Patrinia scabiosaefolia in Korea.
