= Eupithecia repentina =

Scientific classification
- Kingdom: Animalia
- Phylum: Arthropoda
- Clade: Pancrustacea
- Class: Insecta
- Order: Lepidoptera
- Family: Geometridae
- Genus: Eupithecia
- Species: E. repentina

Binomial name
- Eupithecia repentina Vojnits & de Laever, 1978

Species of moth

Eupithecia repentina is a moth in the family Geometridae. It is endemic to eastern Russia, Korea, China and Japan.

The species was introduced with its foodplant (Mosla dianthera) to a small park in Novomoskovsk (Tula Province, Russia) between 1950 and 1990. This small area now supports a small population of the species.

The wingspan is about 19–21 mm.
