= Scopula diffinaria =

Scientific classification
- Kingdom: Animalia
- Phylum: Arthropoda
- Clade: Pancrustacea
- Class: Insecta
- Order: Lepidoptera
- Family: Geometridae
- Genus: Scopula
- Species: S. diffinaria

Binomial name
- Scopula diffinaria (Prout, 1913)

Synonyms
- Glossotrophia diffinaria Prout, 1913

Species of geometer moth in subfamily Sterrhinae

Scopula diffinaria is a moth of the family Geometridae. It is found in Armenia, Georgia, Russia and Turkey.

The larvae possibly feed on Silene species and Linum catharticum.
