= Eupithecia kobayashii =

Scientific classification
- Kingdom: Animalia
- Phylum: Arthropoda
- Class: Insecta
- Order: Lepidoptera
- Family: Geometridae
- Genus: Eupithecia
- Species: E. kobayashii

Binomial name
- Eupithecia kobayashii Inoue, 1958

Species of moth

Eupithecia kobayashii is a moth in the family Geometridae. It is found in Russia, Japan and Korea.

The wingspan is about 24 mm.
