= Eupithecia rubeni =

Scientific classification
- Domain: Eukaryota
- Kingdom: Animalia
- Phylum: Arthropoda
- Class: Insecta
- Order: Lepidoptera
- Family: Geometridae
- Genus: Eupithecia
- Species: E. rubeni

Binomial name
- Eupithecia rubeni Viidalepp, 1976

Synonyms
- Eupithecia propria Vojnits, 1977

Species of moth

Eupithecia rubeni is a moth in the family Geometridae. It is found in Mongolia and Russia.
