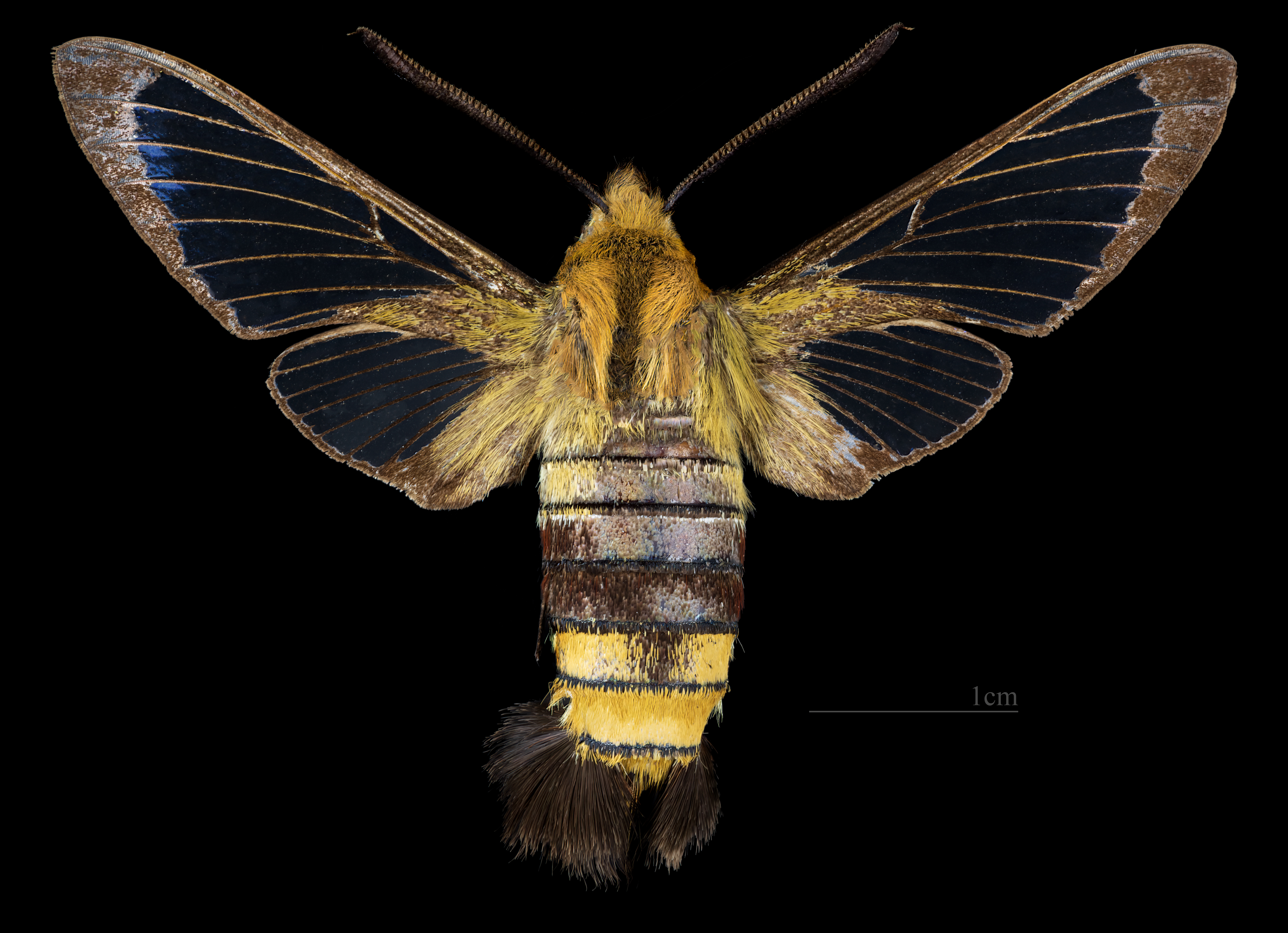
- Hemaris saundersii ♂
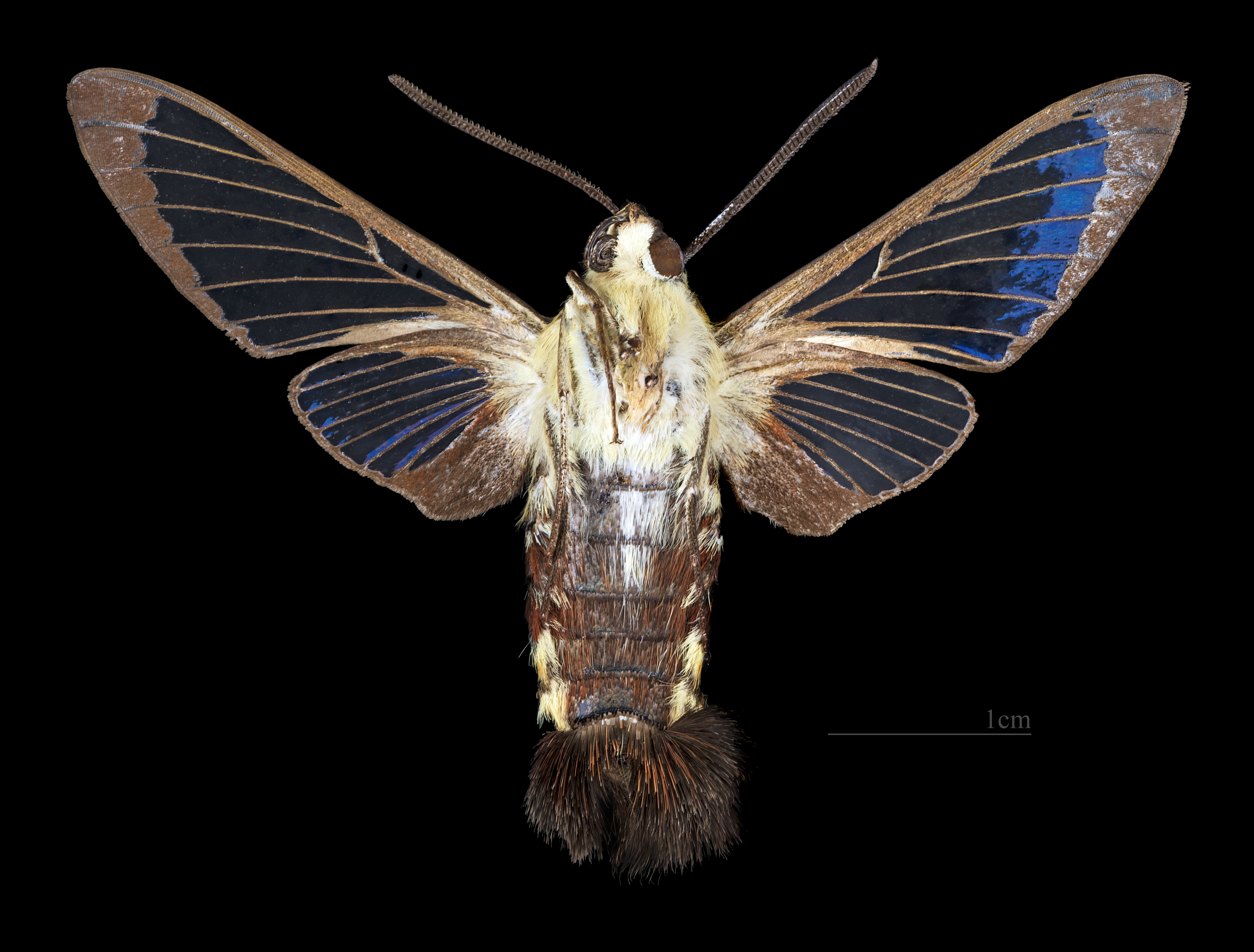
- Hemaris saundersii ♂ △

Scientific classification
- Domain: Eukaryota
- Kingdom: Animalia
- Phylum: Arthropoda
- Class: Insecta
- Order: Lepidoptera
- Family: Sphingidae
- Genus: Hemaris
- Species: H. saundersii

Binomial name
- Hemaris saundersii (Walker, 1856)

Synonyms
- Sesia saundersii Walker, 1856; Macroglossa curtisii Boisduval, 1875

= Hemaris saundersii =

Species of moth

Hemaris saundersii, or Saunders' bee hawkmoth, is a moth of the family Sphingidae. The species was first described by Francis Walker in 1856. It is found from southern Kashmir, northern Pakistan, northern India (Himachal Pradesh) and north-eastern Afghanistan, eastwards along the Himalayan foothills of India (Punjab, Uttar Pradesh and Sikkim) to Bangladesh and northern Myanmar. The habitat consists of scrub-jungle at 1,800 to 3,000 metres altitude.

The wingspan is 50–60 mm. It is a diurnal species. Adults are on ing in June in Kashmir and from April to May and again in July in Himachal Pradesh.

The larvae feed on Lonicera quinquelocularis in India.
