= Hemaris galunae =

Scientific classification
- Kingdom: Animalia
- Phylum: Arthropoda
- Class: Insecta
- Order: Lepidoptera
- Family: Sphingidae
- Genus: Hemaris
- Species: H. galunae

Binomial name
- Hemaris galunae Eitschberger, Müller & Kravchenko, 2005

Species of moth

Hemaris galunae is a moth of the family Sphingidae. The species was first described by Ulf Eitschberger, Günter C. Müller and Vasiliy D. Kravchenko in 2005. It is known from Syria.

Some authors regard Hemaris galunae as a dry zone form of H. tityus or as an isolated eastern population of H. aksana, left stranded as North Africa dried out after the last ice age.
