= Aksana =

Aksana may refer to:

- Aksana (given name), a female given name
- Aksana (wrestler) (Živilė Raudonienė, born 1982), Lithuanian professional wrestler
- Hemaris aksana, a moth of the family Sphingidae
- Kawésqar language, also known as Aksana
