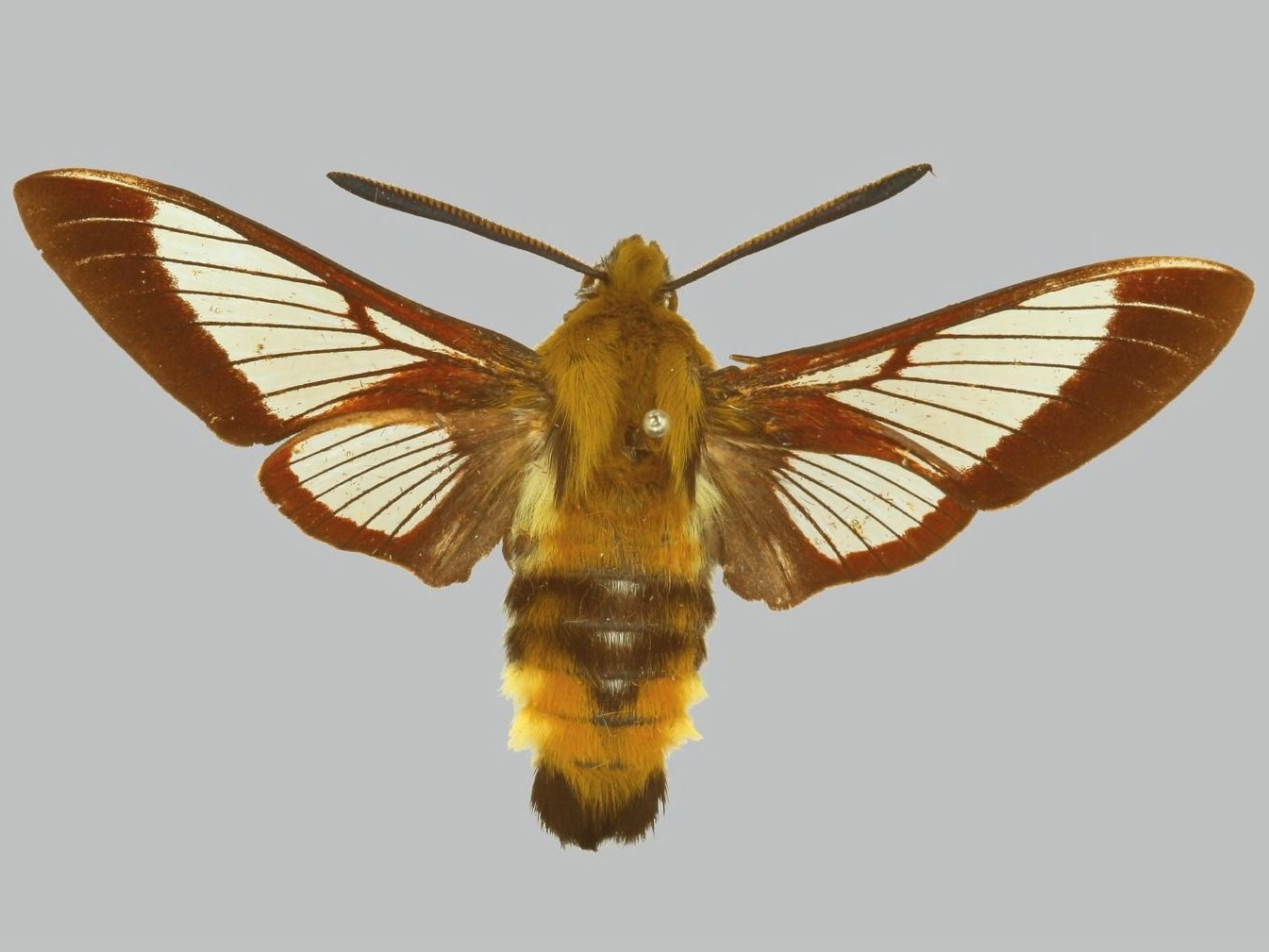
- Male, dorsal view

Scientific classification
- Kingdom: Animalia
- Phylum: Arthropoda
- Class: Insecta
- Order: Lepidoptera
- Family: Sphingidae
- Genus: Hemaris
- Species: H. beresowskii

Binomial name
- Hemaris beresowskii Alphéraky, 1897

Synonyms
- Hemaris beresovskii Kuznetsova, 1906

= Hemaris beresowskii =

Species of moth

Hemaris beresowskii is a moth of the family Sphingidae. It is known from south-western China.

There is a transparent discal cell on the forewing that is generally divided longitudinally by a vestigial scaled fold. The hindwing upperside very similar to Hemaris ottonis.
