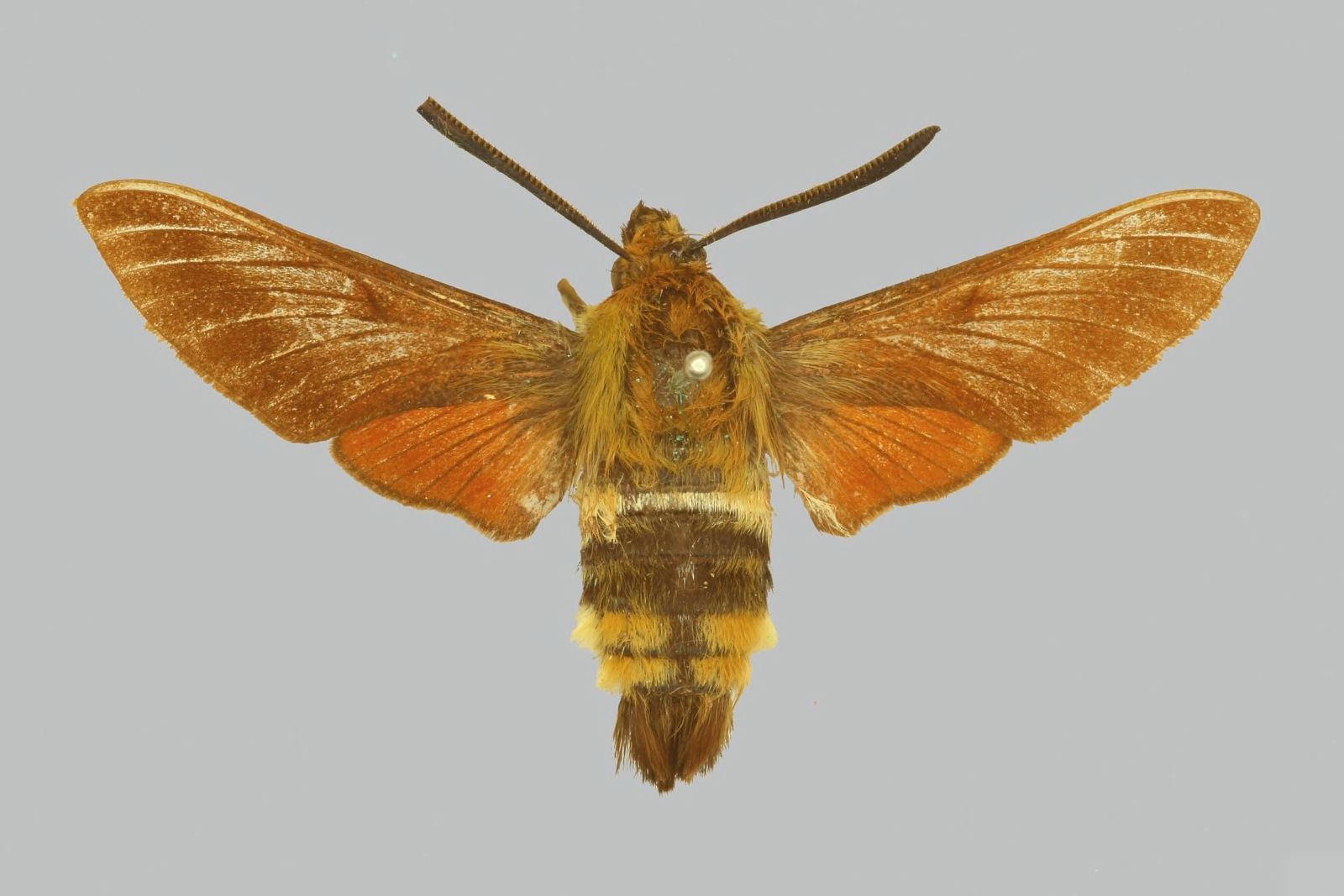

Scientific classification
- Domain: Eukaryota
- Kingdom: Animalia
- Phylum: Arthropoda
- Class: Insecta
- Order: Lepidoptera
- Family: Sphingidae
- Genus: Hemaris
- Species: H. rubra

Binomial name
- Hemaris rubra Hampson, 189

= Hemaris rubra =

Species of moth

Hemaris rubra, the Kashmir bee hawkmoth, is a moth of the family Sphingidae. The species was first described by George Hampson in 1893. It is known from a number of valleys in Kashmir. The habitat consists of flower-rich meadows at around 2,500 meters.

The wingspan is 44–58 mm. It is a diurnal species. Adults are on wing from mid-June to early August, in one generation per year.
