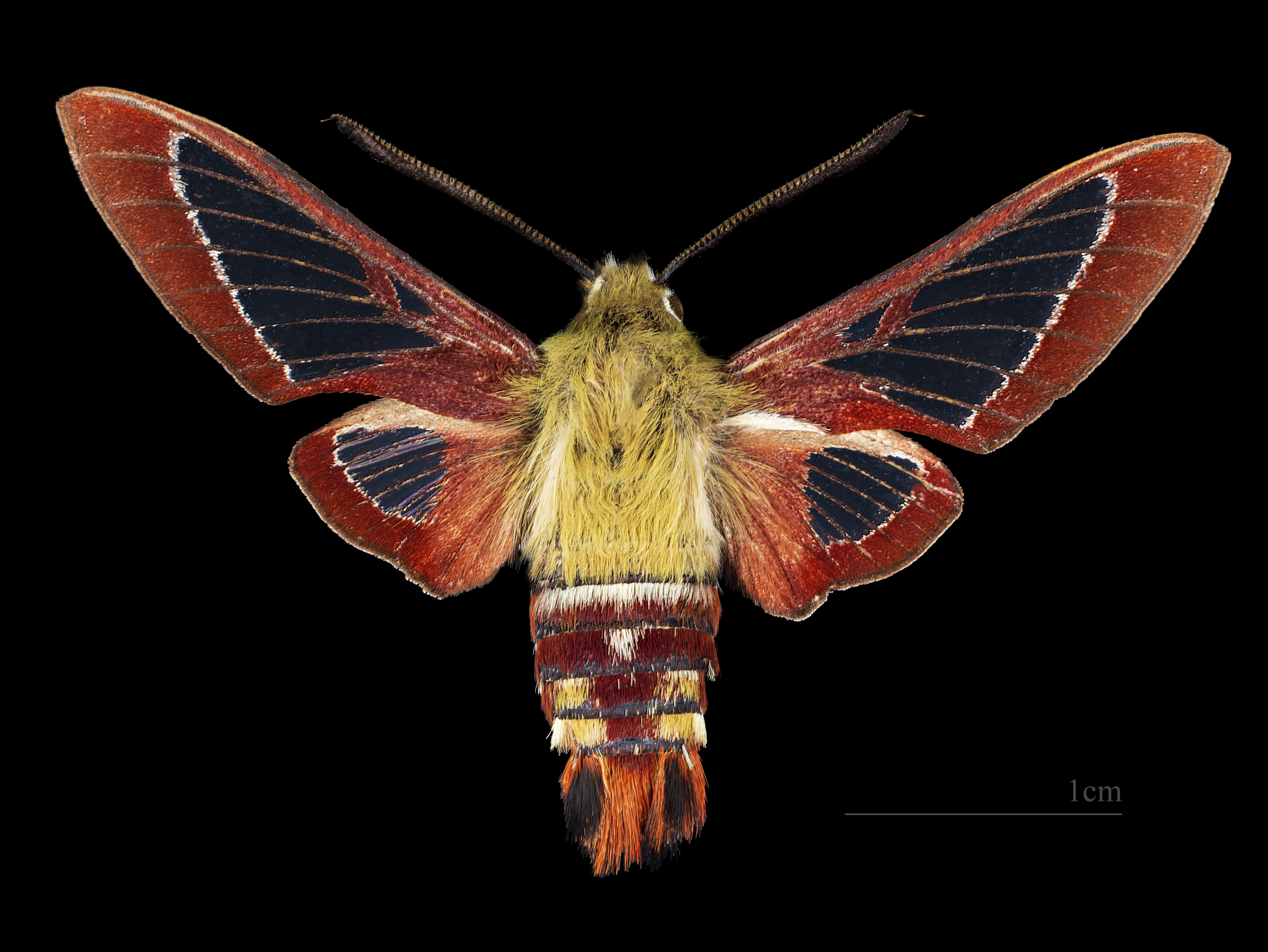
- Hemaris gracilis ♂
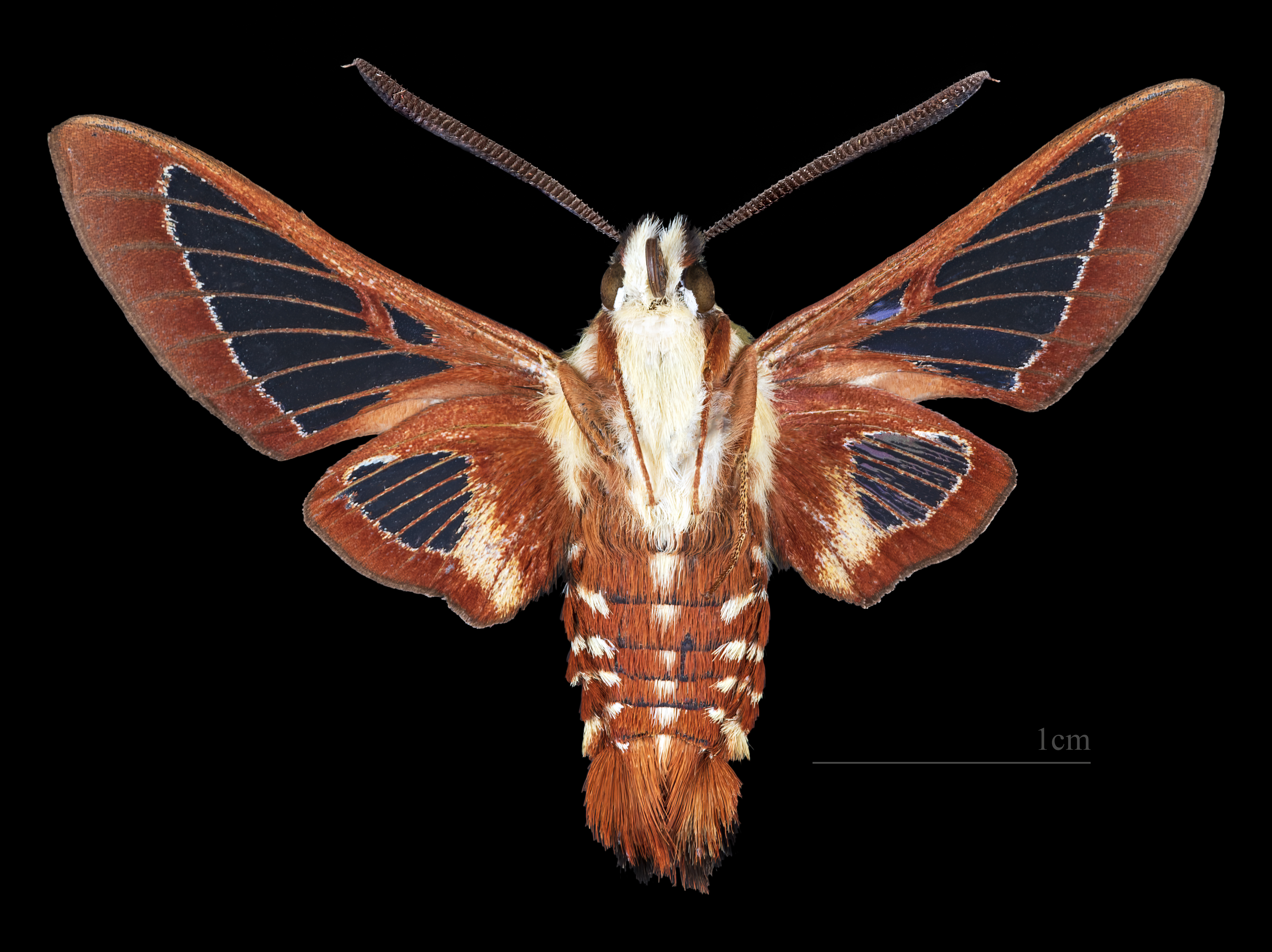
- Hemaris gracilis ♂ △

Scientific classification
- Domain: Eukaryota
- Kingdom: Animalia
- Phylum: Arthropoda
- Class: Insecta
- Order: Lepidoptera
- Family: Sphingidae
- Genus: Hemaris
- Species: H. gracilis

Binomial name
- Hemaris gracilis (Grote & Robinson, 1865)

Synonyms
- Haemorrhagia gracilis Grote & Robinson, 1865

= Hemaris gracilis =

Species of moth

Hemaris gracilis, the slender clearwing or graceful clearwing, is a moth of the family Sphingidae. The species was first described by Augustus Radcliffe Grote and Coleman Townsend Robinson in 1865.

== Distribution ==
It is found in North America from Nova Scotia to central Florida along the East Coast and west through New England to Michigan to Saskatchewan. The species is listed as threatened in Connecticut and of Special Concern in Massachusetts.

== Description ==
The wingspan is 40–45 mm. It can be distinguished from similar species by a pair of red-brown bands on the sides of the thorax, which vary from green to yellow green dorsally and sometimes brown with white underneath. They have a red abdomen. The wings are transparent with reddish-brown borders. The outer edge of the forewing transparent area is even, and the forewing cell has a median row of scales.

== Biology ==
There are probably two generations per year, with adults on wing from March to August. They feed on the nectar of various flowers, including Pontederia cordata, Rubus species, Taraxacum officinale, Hieracium aurantiacum, and Phlox species.

The larvae have been recorded feeding on Vaccinium vacillans and Kalmia species. Pupation takes place in a thin walled cocoon under leaf litter.
