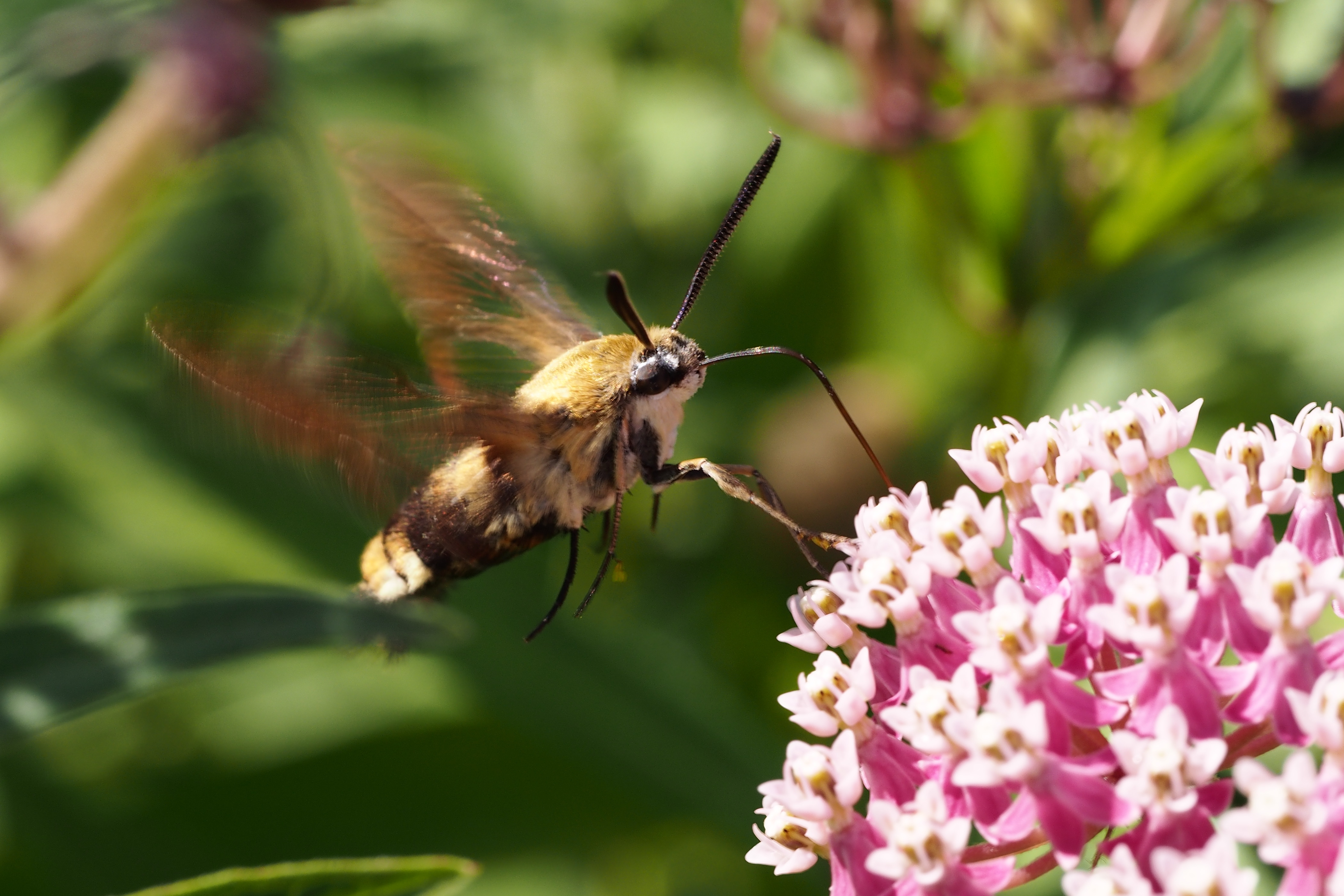

Scientific classification
- Kingdom: Animalia
- Phylum: Arthropoda
- Class: Insecta
- Order: Lepidoptera
- Family: Sphingidae
- Genus: Hemaris
- Species: H. radians

Binomial name
- Hemaris radians (Walker, 1856)

Synonyms
- Sesia radians Walker, 1856; Hemaris mandarina Butler, 1875; Macroglossa fuciformis brunneobasalis Staudinger, 1892

= Hemaris radians =

Species of moth

Hemaris radians is a moth of the family Sphingidae. It is known from southern Siberia, Mongolia, the southern Russian Far East, north-eastern and central-eastern China, the Korean Peninsula and Japan.

The wingspan is 37–40 mm. Adults are on wing from mid-May to late July in Korea.

It looks like a bee, but it is not.

The larvae have been recorded feeding on Lonicera and Rubia species in the Russian Far East and Lonicera japonica in Korea.
