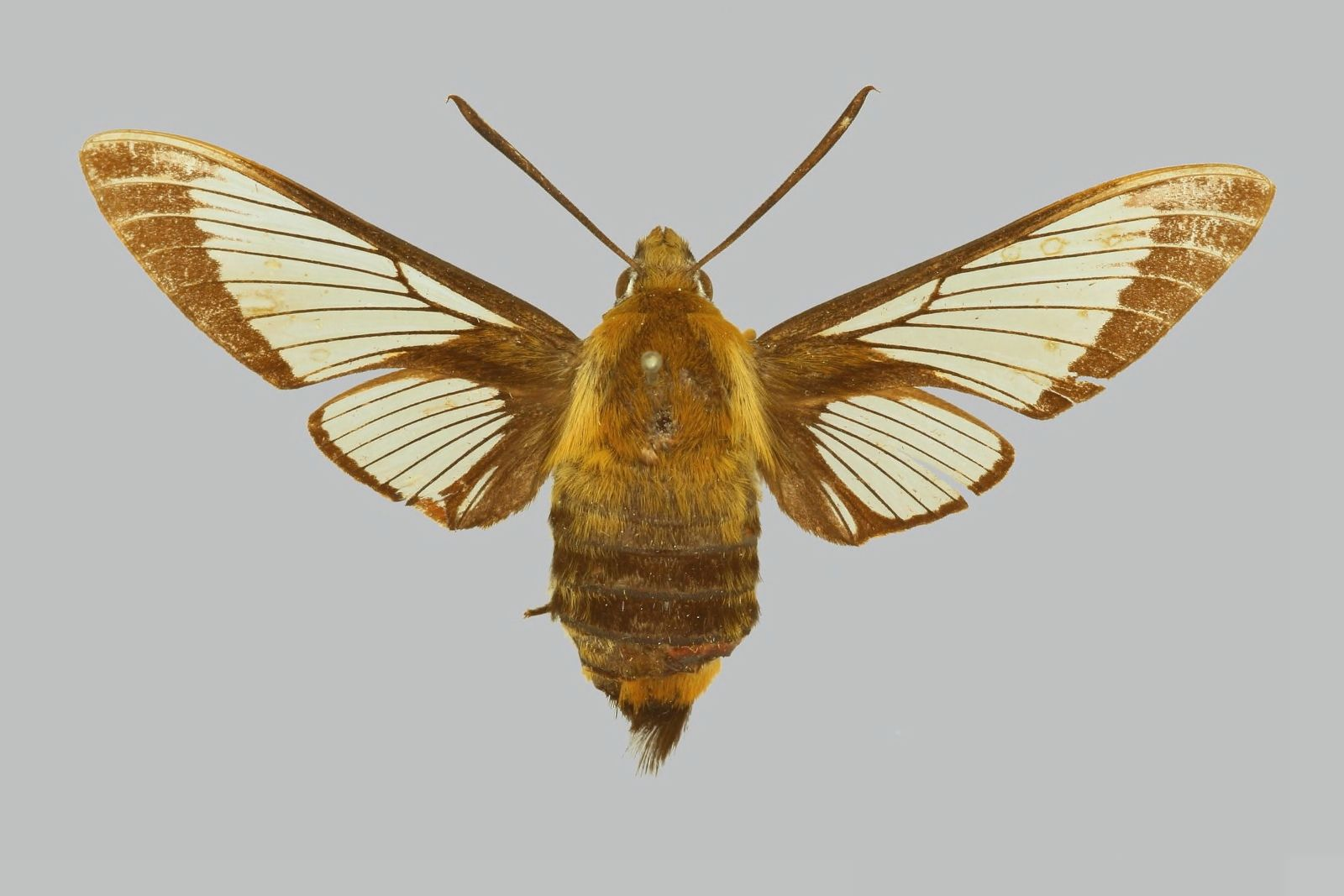

Scientific classification
- Kingdom: Animalia
- Phylum: Arthropoda
- Class: Insecta
- Order: Lepidoptera
- Family: Sphingidae
- Genus: Hemaris
- Species: H. ottonis

Binomial name
- Hemaris ottonis (Rothschild & Jordan, 1903)

Synonyms
- Haemorrhagia ottonis Rothschild & Jordan, 1903; Hemaris stueningi Eitschberger, Danner & Surholt, 1998

= Hemaris ottonis =

Species of moth

Hemaris ottonis is a moth of the family Sphingidae. It is known from the Russian Far East, north-eastern China and the Korean Peninsula.

The wingspan is 37–40 mm. It is similar to Hemaris staudingeri but distinguishable by the pale lateral stripes on the upperside of the thorax. There are with pale lateral stripes on the upperside of the thorax.

Adults are on wing from mid-May to late July in Korea.

The larvae have been recorded feeding on Lonicera japonica.
