= Hemaris saldaitisi =

Scientific classification
- Kingdom: Animalia
- Phylum: Arthropoda
- Class: Insecta
- Order: Lepidoptera
- Family: Sphingidae
- Genus: Hemaris
- Species: H. saldaitisi

Binomial name
- Hemaris saldaitisi Eitschberger, Danner & Surholt, 1998

Synonyms
- Mandarina saldaitisi Eitschberger, Danner & Surholt, 1998

Species of moth

Hemaris saldaitisi is a moth of the family Sphingidae. It is known from Tuva in Russia.
