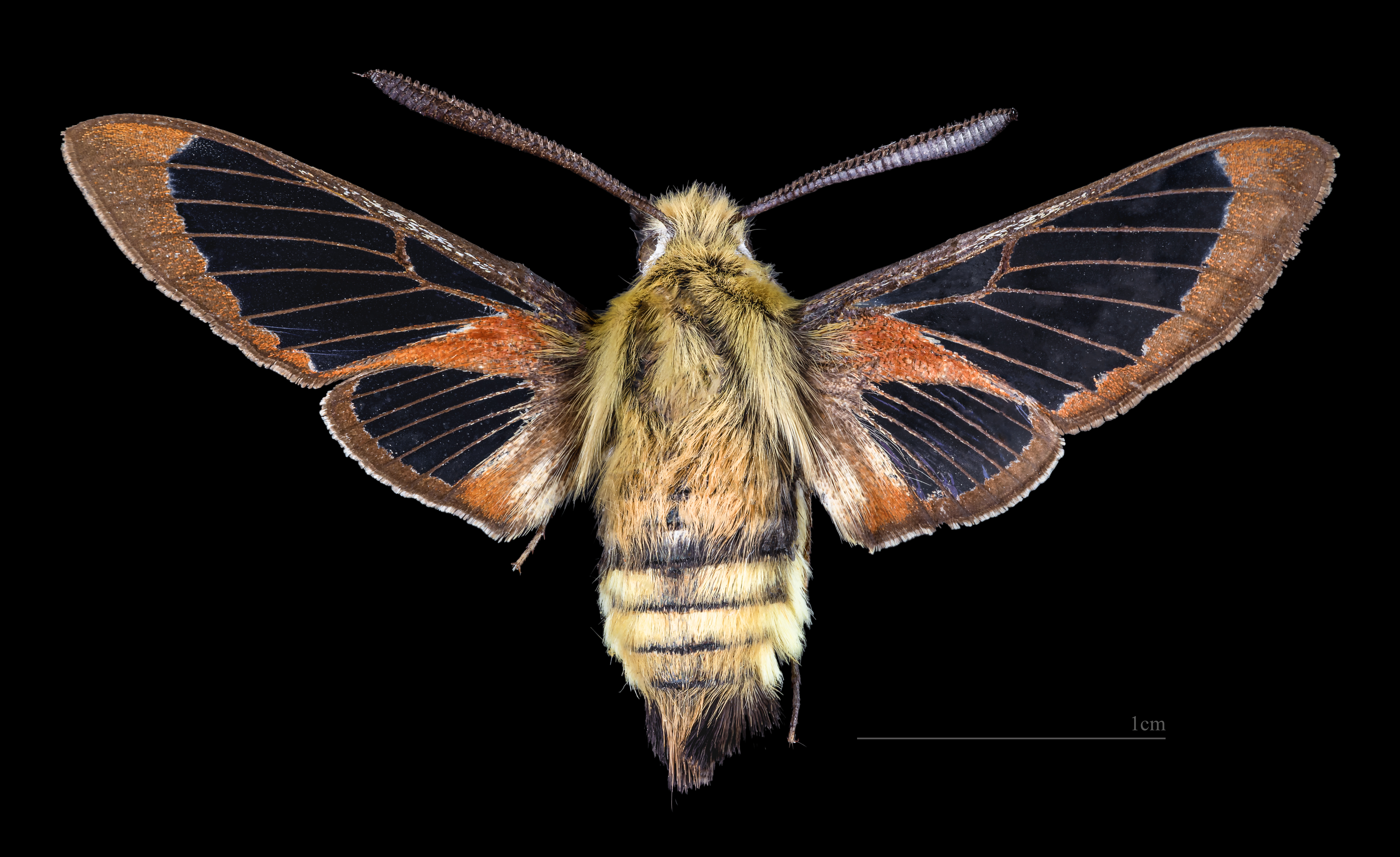
- Male dorsal
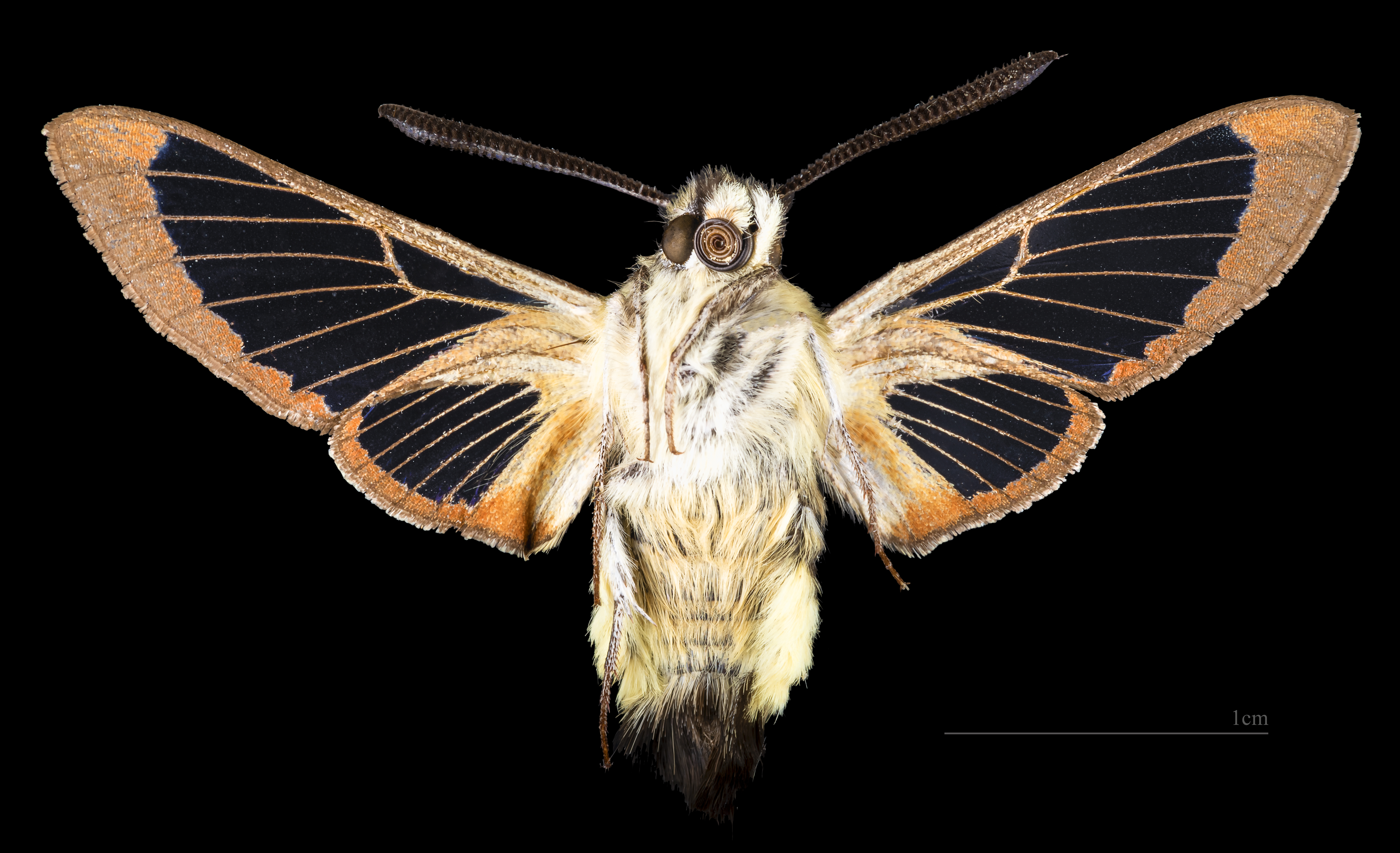
- Male dorsal

Scientific classification
- Domain: Eukaryota
- Kingdom: Animalia
- Phylum: Arthropoda
- Class: Insecta
- Order: Lepidoptera
- Family: Sphingidae
- Genus: Hemaris
- Species: H. thetis

Binomial name
- Hemaris thetis Boisduval, 1855

Synonyms
- Macroglossa thetis Boisduval, 1855; Macroglossa senta Strecker, 1878; Hemaris senta (Strecker, 1878); Hemaris rubens Edwards, 1875; Hemaris palpalis Grote, 1874; Hemaris minima Frankenbusch, 1925; Hemaris diffinis mcdunnoughi Clark, 1927; Hemaris diffinis jordani Barnes & Benjamin, 1927; Hemaris diffinis heppneri Eitschberger, Danner & Surholt, 1996; Hemaris cynoglossum Edwards, 1875; Hemaris brucei French, 1890

= Hemaris thetis =

Species of moth

Hemaris thetis, the Rocky Mountain clearwing or California clearwing, is a moth of the family Sphingidae. The species was first described by Jean Baptiste Boisduval in 1855. It is found from Colorado, New Mexico, Montana, Idaho, Wyoming and Utah west to California and north to British Columbia. The habitat consists of streamsides and meadows in mountainous areas.

There is probably one generation per year with adults on wing from May to August. They feed on the nectar of various flowers, including Arctostaphylos uva-ursi and Lupinus species.

The larvae feed on Symphoricarpos species.
