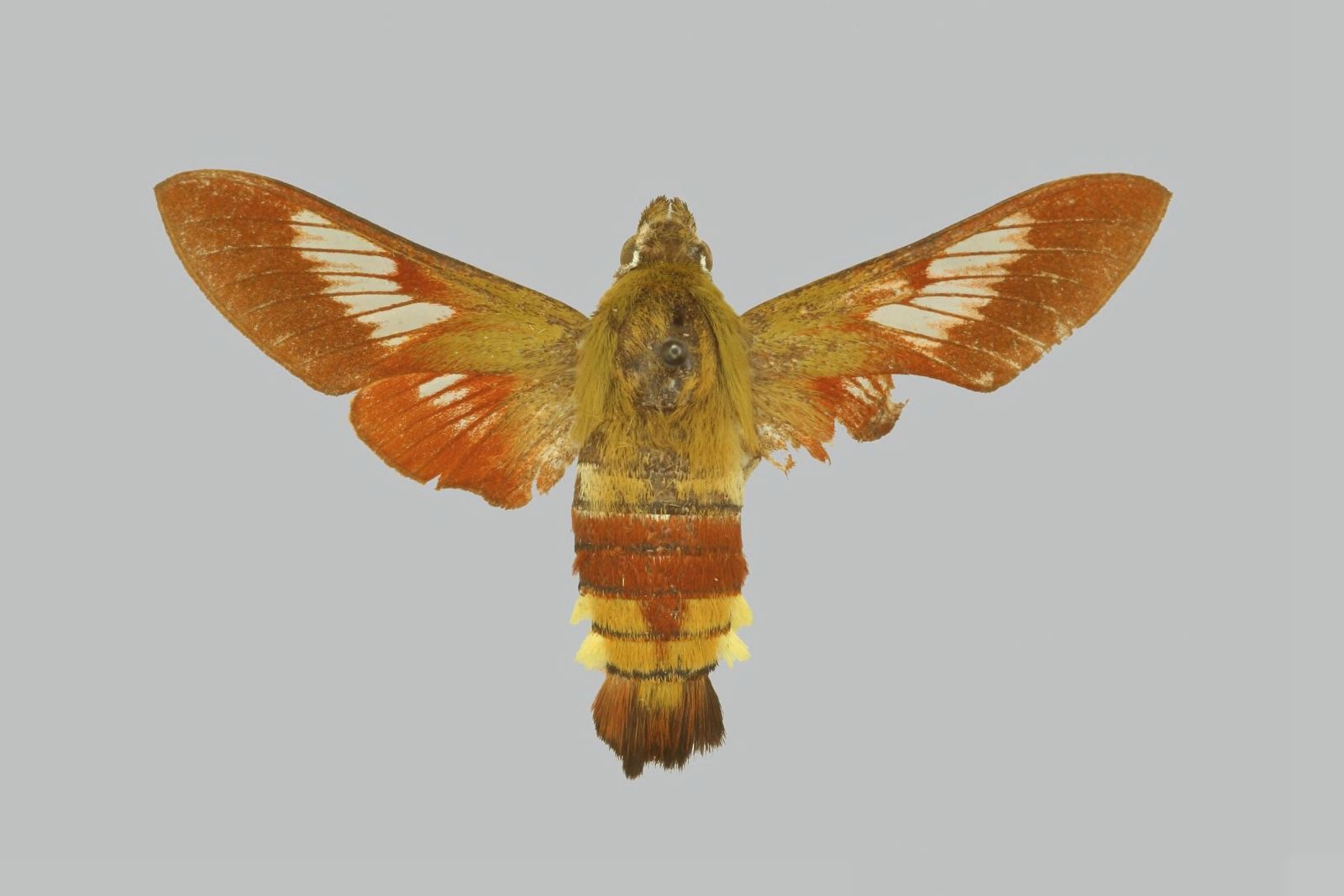

Scientific classification
- Kingdom: Animalia
- Phylum: Arthropoda
- Class: Insecta
- Order: Lepidoptera
- Family: Sphingidae
- Genus: Hemaris
- Species: H. dentata

Binomial name
- Hemaris dentata (Staudinger, 1887)

Synonyms
- Macroglossa dentata Staudinger, 1887

= Hemaris dentata =

Species of moth

Hemaris dentata, the Anatolian bee hawkmoth, is a moth of the family Sphingidae. The species was first described by Otto Staudinger in 1887. It is known from southern Turkey as far west as the Taurus Mountains.

The wingspan is 36–45 mm. It is a diurnal species. Adults are on wing from mid to late July in one generation per year.

The larvae probably feed on Lonicera species.
