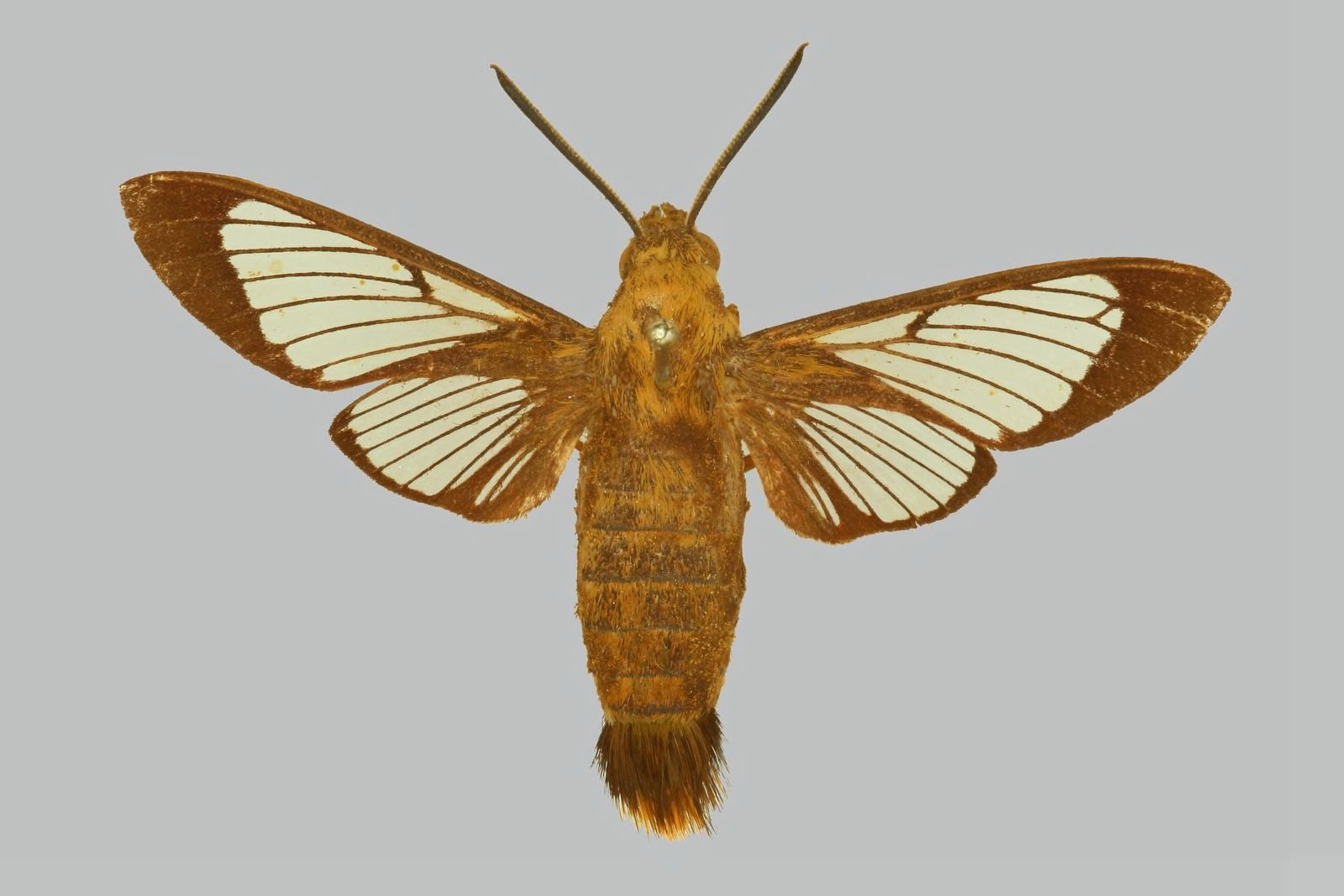
- Male, upperside
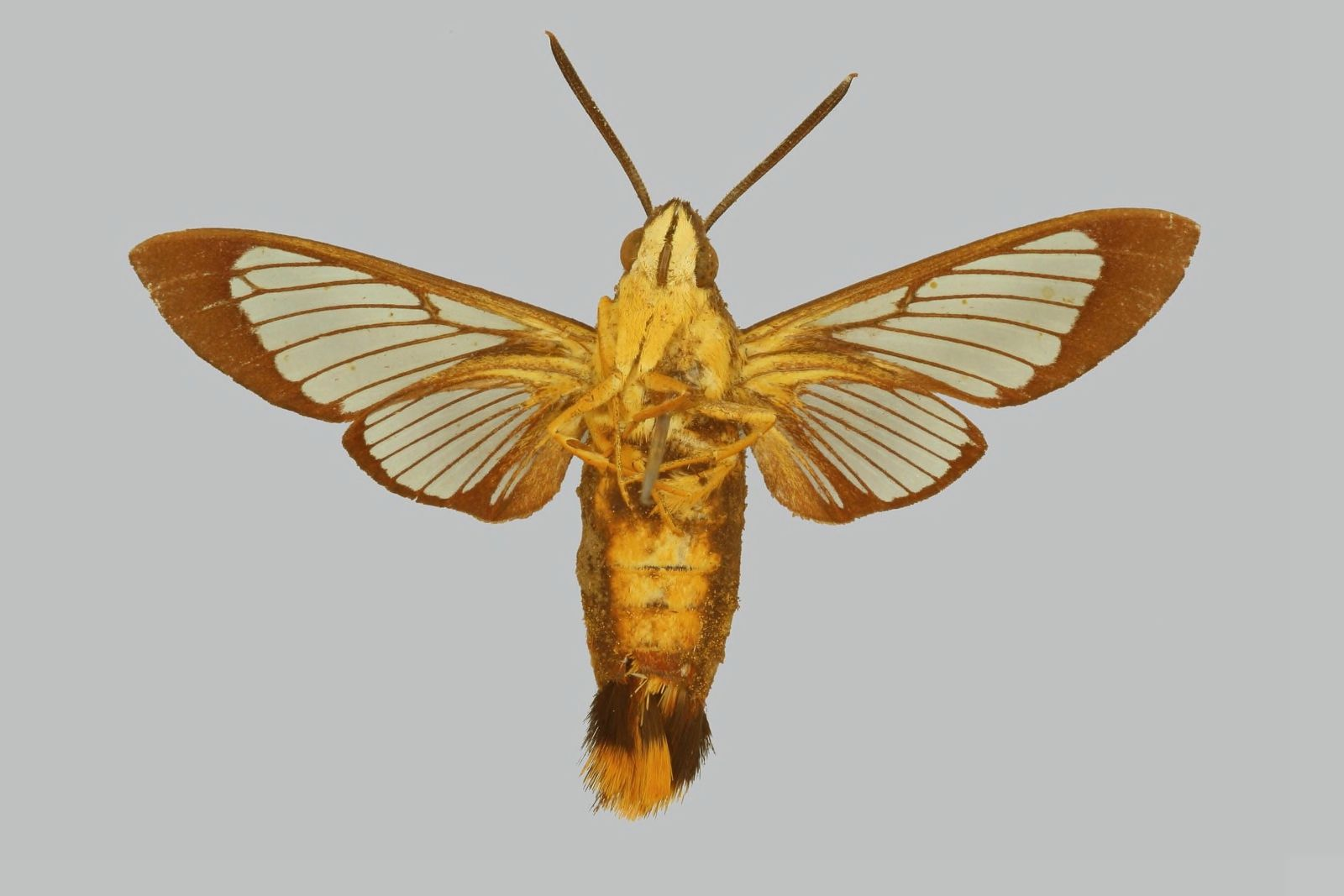
- Male, underside

Scientific classification
- Domain: Eukaryota
- Kingdom: Animalia
- Phylum: Arthropoda
- Class: Insecta
- Order: Lepidoptera
- Family: Sphingidae
- Genus: Hemaris
- Species: H. venata

Binomial name
- Hemaris venata (Felder, 1861)

Synonyms
- Macroglossa venata C. Felder, 1861

= Hemaris venata =

Species of moth

Hemaris venata is a moth of the family Sphingidae. It is known from Seram and Papua New Guinea.

The antenna is slender with a long hook. The underside of the thorax, legs, abdomen and apex of the anal tuft are yellow.
