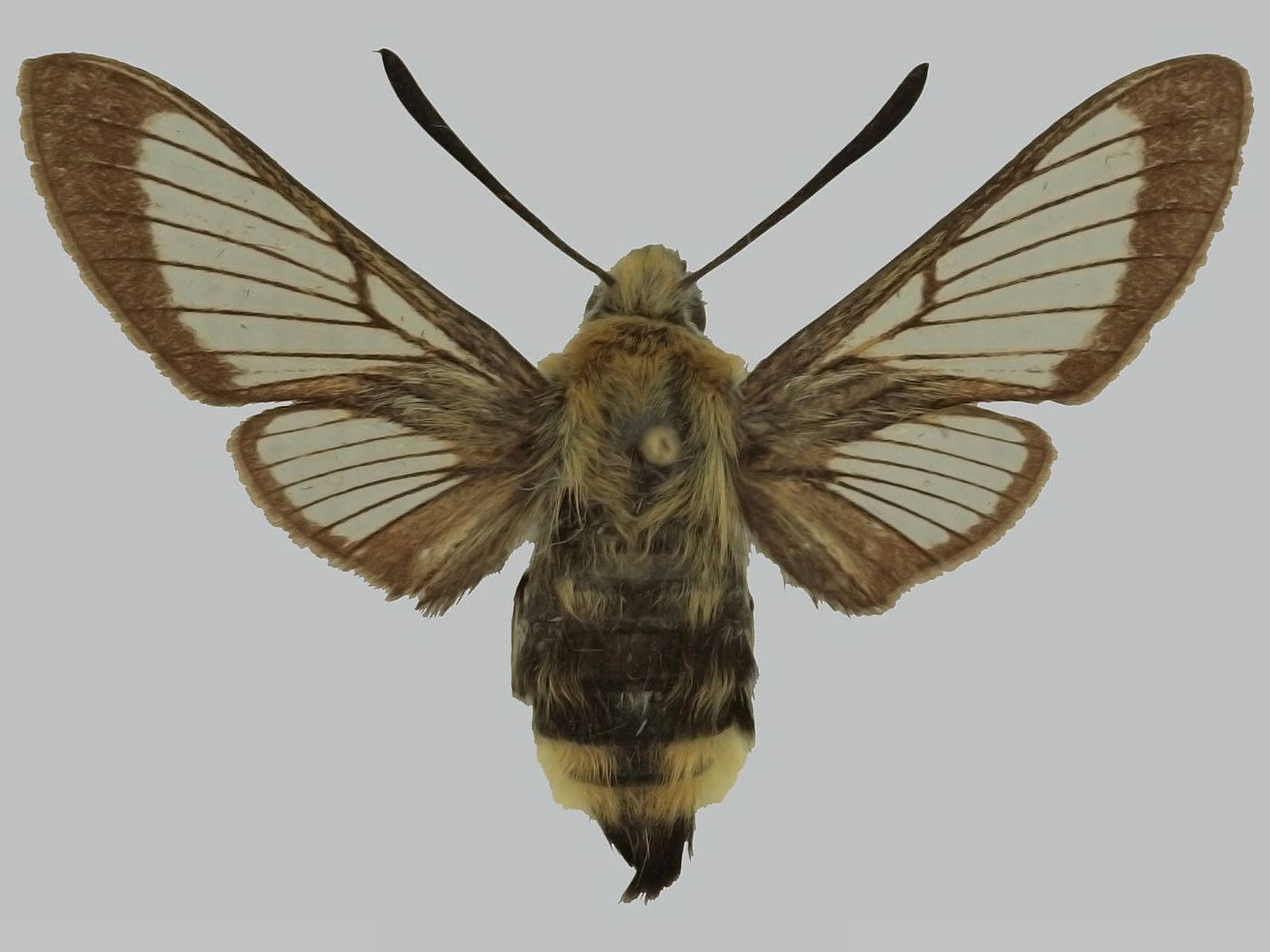

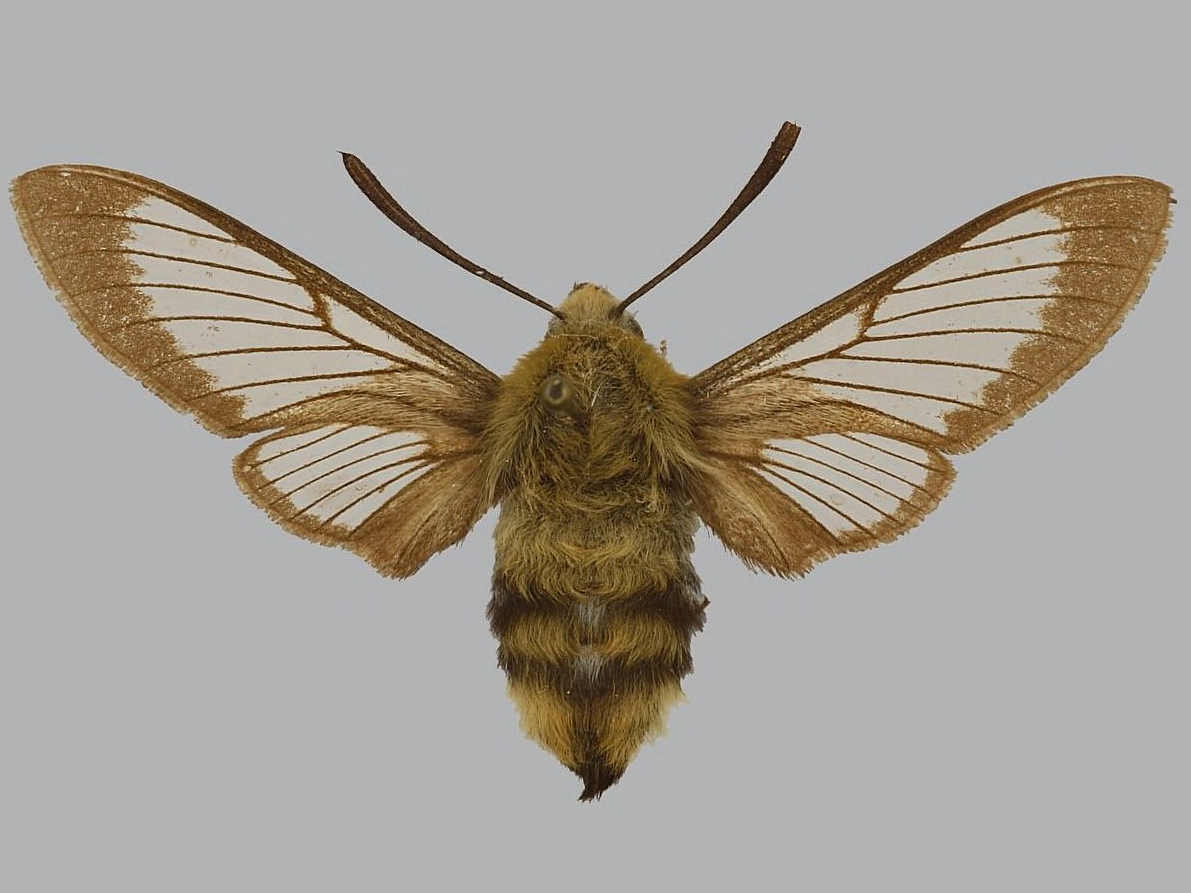
- Male and female

Scientific classification
- Domain: Eukaryota
- Kingdom: Animalia
- Phylum: Arthropoda
- Class: Insecta
- Order: Lepidoptera
- Family: Sphingidae
- Genus: Hemaris
- Species: H. alaiana

Binomial name
- Hemaris alaiana (Rothschild & Jordan, 1903)

Synonyms
- Haemorrhagia alaiana Rothschild & Jordan, 1903

= Hemaris alaiana =

Species of moth

Hemaris alaiana, the Alai bee hawkmoth, is a moth of the family Sphingidae. The species was first described by Walter Rothschild and Karl Jordan in 1903. It is known from the Alayskiy Khrebet, Tian Shan, Dzungarian Alatau, Saur and Altai mountains, from Tajikistan and eastern Kazakhstan to western Mongolia. The habitat consists of montane meadows and woodland glades rich in flowers, generally from 1,400 to 2,200 meters altitude.

The wingspan is 35–45 mm. It is a diurnal species. Adults are on wing from early June to mid-July.

The larvae probably feed on Lonicera, Rubia and Galium species.
