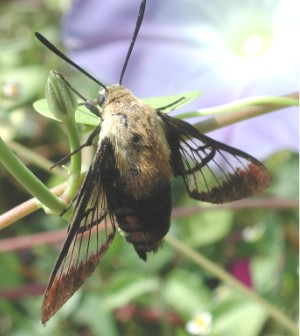
- H. diffinis at Lake Junaluska, U.S.

Scientific classification
- Kingdom: Animalia
- Phylum: Arthropoda
- Clade: Pancrustacea
- Class: Insecta
- Order: Lepidoptera
- Family: Sphingidae
- Subtribe: Hemarina
- Genus: Hemaris; Dalman, 1816

Species
- See text

Synonyms
- Aege R. Felder, 1874; Chamaesesia Grote, 1873; Cochrania Tutt, 1902; Eitschbergera Kemal & Koçak, 2005; Haemorrhagia Grote & Robinson, 1865; Hemaria Billberg, 1820; Saundersia Eitschberger, Danner & Surholt, 1998; Mandarina Eitschberger, Danner & Surholt, 1998; Jilinga Eitschberger, Danner & Surholt, 1998

= Hemaris =

Genus of moths

Hemaris is a genus of sphinx moths in the subfamily Macroglossinae, which is native to the Holarctic. Their main host plants are herbs and shrubs of the teasel and honeysuckle families. Moths in genus Hemaris are known collectively as clearwing moths in the US and Canada and bee hawk-moths in Britain. The related Old World hummingbird hawk-moths, genus Macroglossum, are similar in appearance and habits. Both genera have tails that are provided with an expansile truncated tuft of hairs, but only Hemaris has the disc of the wings transparent, as these scales are dropped soon after eclosion.

== Description ==
The eggs are small, spherical, and pale glossy green in color. Host plants include shrub and vining honeysuckles and teasels.

The larvae are small, cylindrical, and covered in granules that often have small bristles. Most larvae are green, brown, and gray, but there are many color forms. All have a distinctive pale dorsolateral longitudinal stripe from head to horn.

The pupa is enclosed in a loosely spun cocoon, and is glossy in most species. There is a prominent tubercle or hook alongside each eye. The cremaster of the chrysalis is large and flattened.

The imagoes, or adults, are small, diurnal moths that resemble bumblebees in shape. They are often mistaken for hummingbirds. The forewings are fully scaled, but in some species patches of scales are lost during the first flight, leaving a glassy hyaline area on each wing. The antennae are strongly clubbed in both sexes and each has a small, recurved hook at the end. The abdomen ends in a large fan of setae.

The genitalia of the male are asymmetrical; the uncus is divided into two subequal lobes and is sclerotized. The ostium bursae, or genital opening, of the female is angled to the left.

A Hemaris feeding on flowers in Minnesota.

== Species ==
There are 23 accepted species. Five species are native to North America, and three to Europe.

- Hemaris aethra (Strecker, 1875) – Diervilla clearwing
- Hemaris affinis Bremer, 1861 – honeysuckle bee hawkmoth
- Hemaris aksana (Le Cerf, 1923) – Atlas bee hawkmoth
- Hemaris alaiana (Rothschild & Jordan, 1903) – Alai bee hawkmoth
- Hemaris beresowskii Alpheraky, 1897
- Hemaris croatica (Esper, 1800) – olive bee hawkmoth
- Hemaris dentata (Staudinger, 1887) – Anatolian bee hawkmoth
- Hemaris diffinis (Boisduval, 1836) – snowberry clearwing
- Hemaris ducalis (Staudinger, 1887) – Pamir bee hawkmoth
- Hemaris fuciformis (Linnaeus, 1758) – broad-bordered bee hawk-moth
- Hemaris galunae Eitschberger, Müller & Kravchenko, 2005 – Levant bee hawkmoth
- Hemaris gracilis (Grote & Robinson, 1865) – slender clearwing or graceful clearwing
- Hemaris molli Eitschberger, Müller & Kravchenko, 2005
- Hemaris ottonis (Rothschild & Jordan, 1903)
- Hemaris radians (Walker, 1856)
- Hemaris rubra Hampson, [1893] – Kashmir bee hawkmoth
- Hemaris saldaitisi Eitschberger, Danner & Surholt, 1998
- Hemaris saundersii (Walker, 1856) – Saunders' bee hawkmoth
- Hemaris staudingeri Leech, 1890
- Hemaris syra (Daniel, 1939) – Syrian bee hawkmoth
- Hemaris thetis Boisduval, 1855 – Rocky Mountain clearwing or California clearwing
- Hemaris thysbe (Fabricius, 1775) – hummingbird clearwing
- Hemaris tityus (Linnaeus, 1758) – narrow-bordered bee hawk-moth
- Hemaris venata (Felder, 1861)
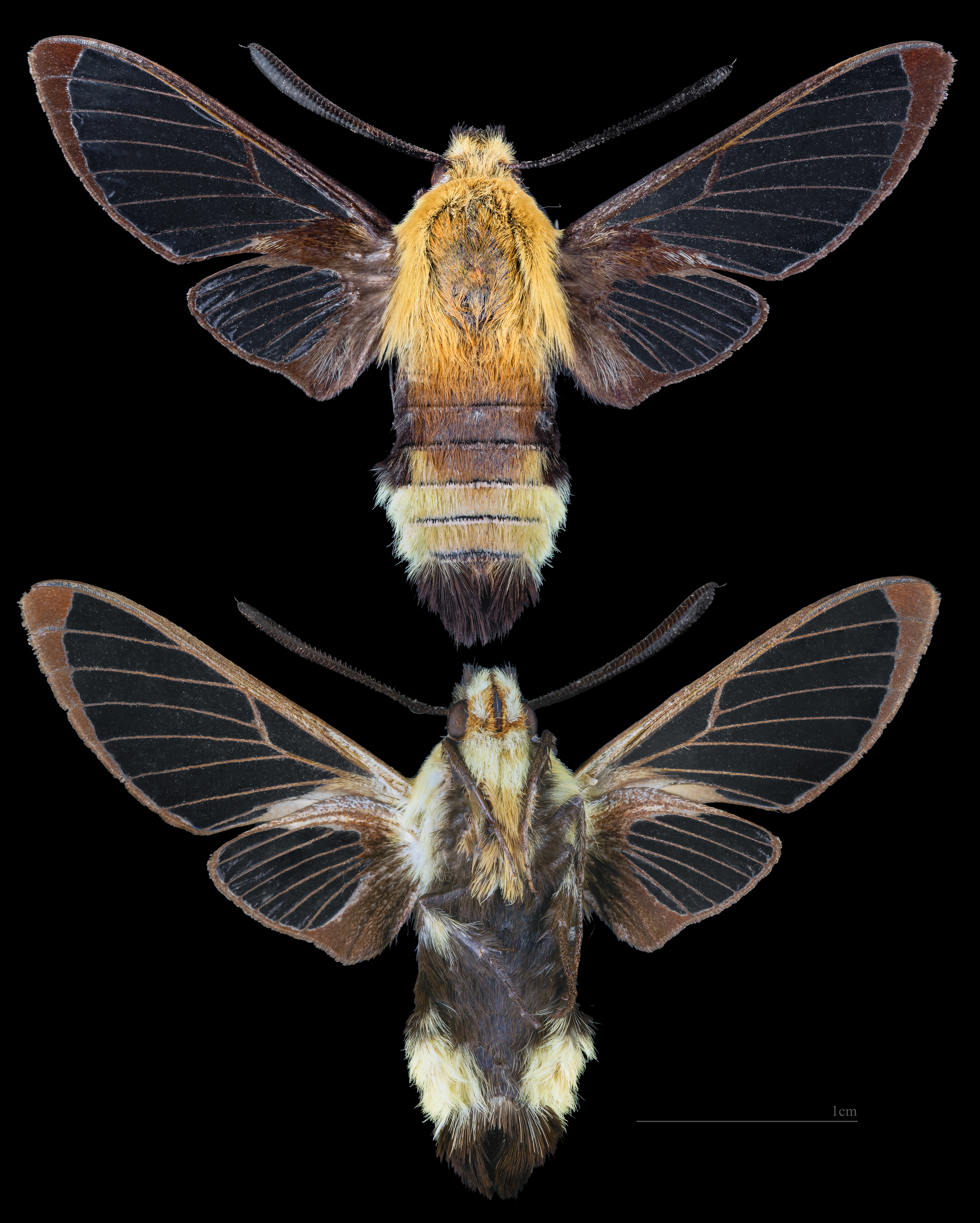
Hemaris diffinis

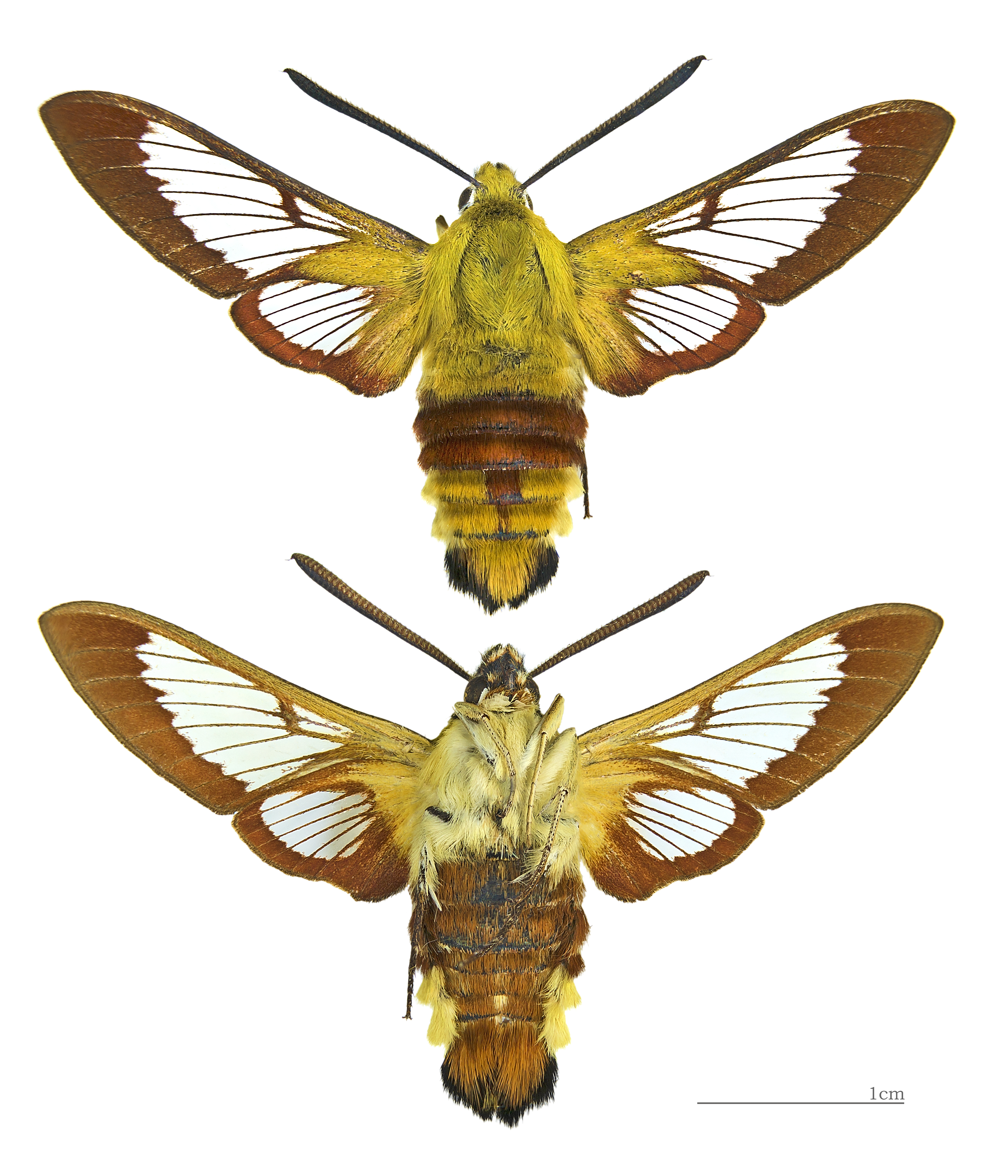
Hemaris fuciformis

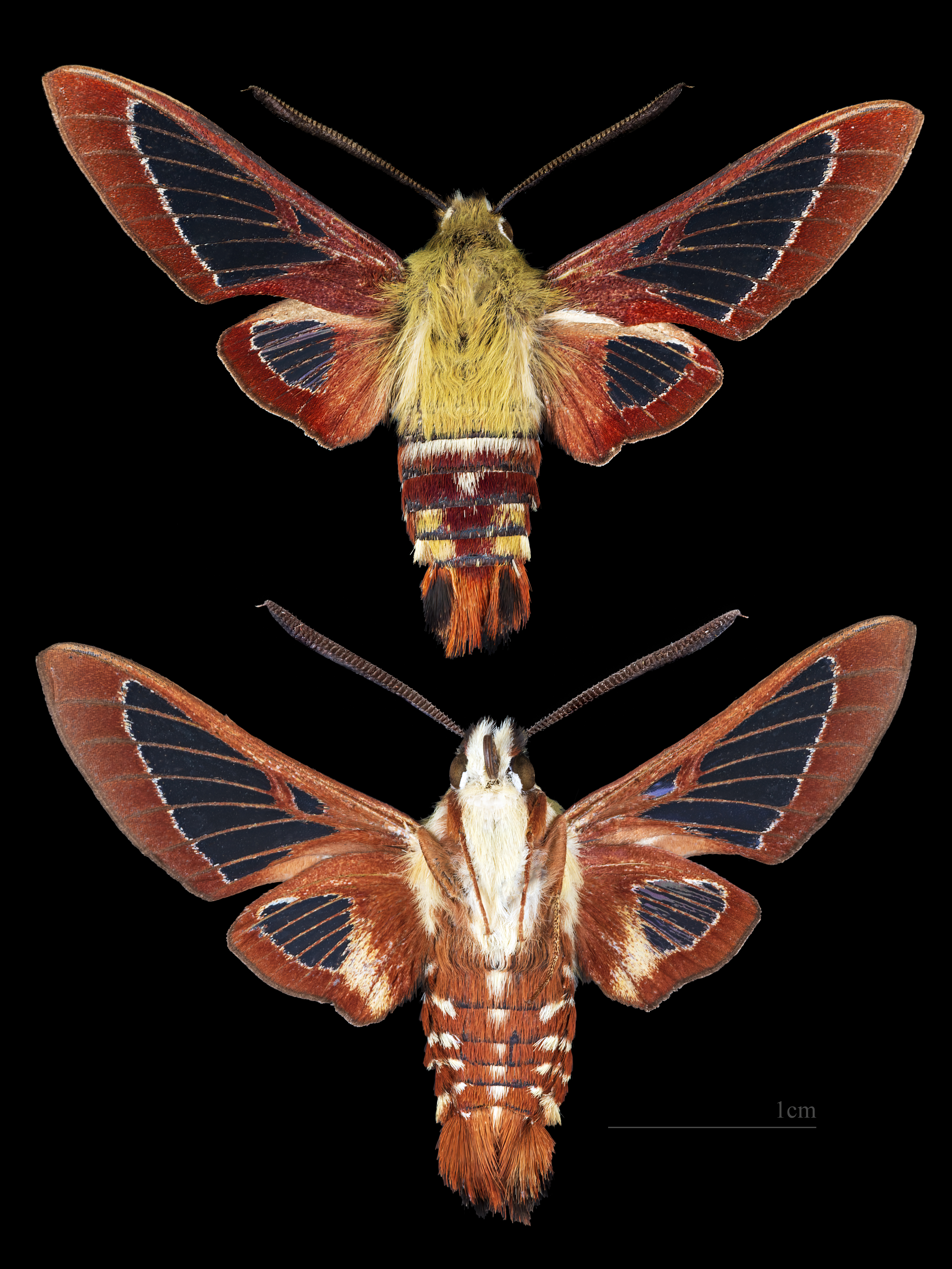
Hemaris gracilis

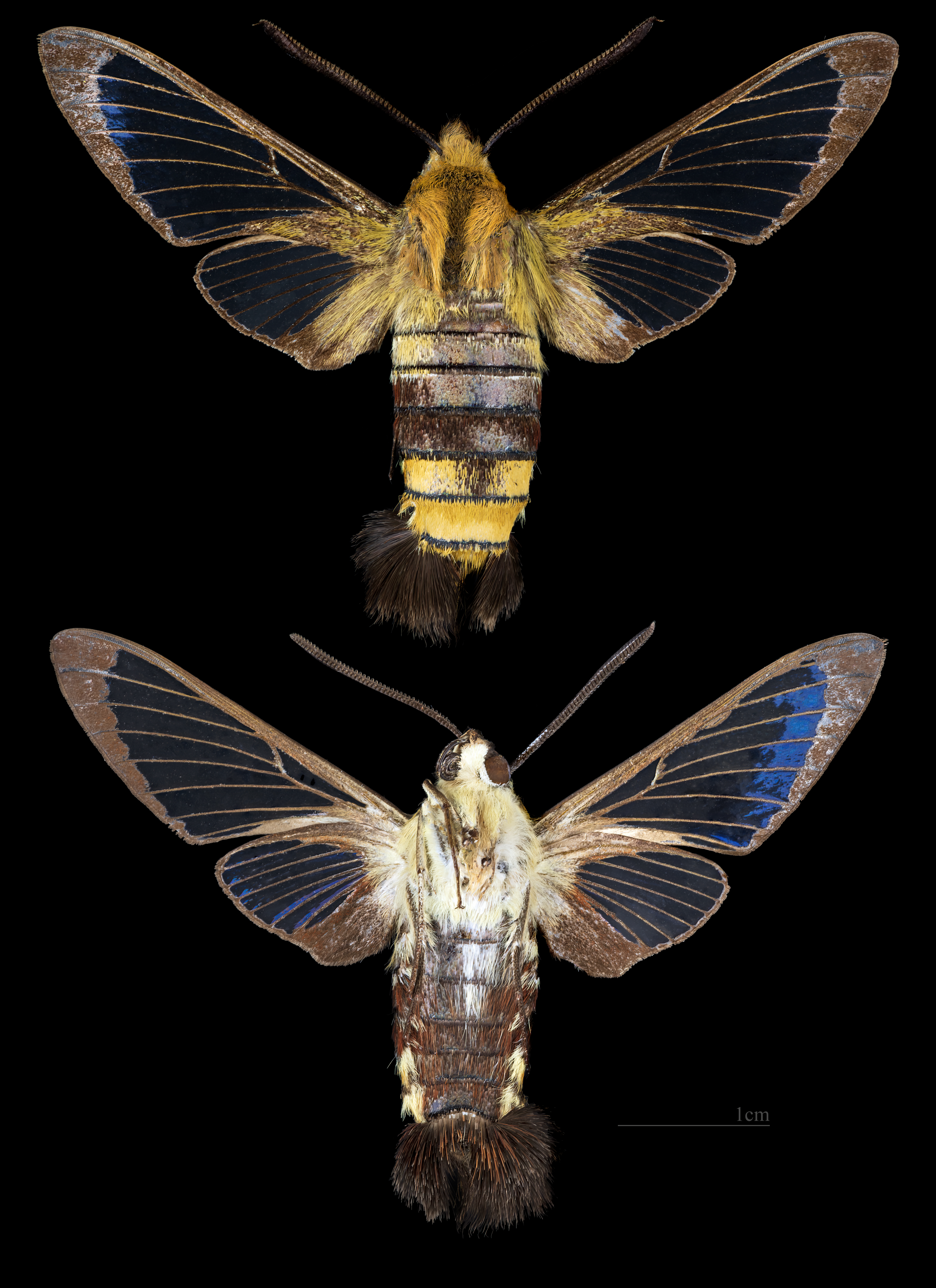
Hemaris saundersii

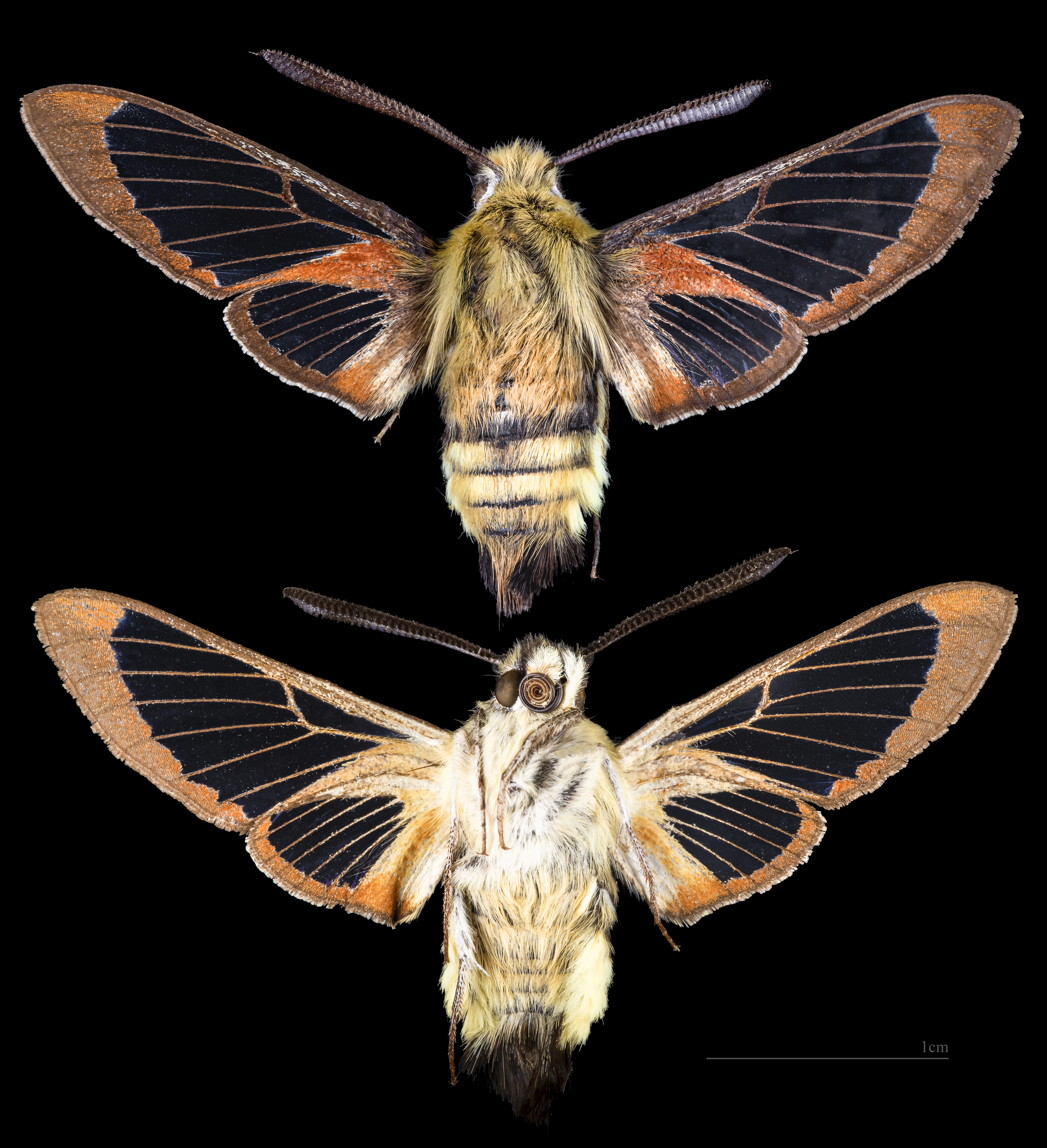
Hemaris thetis

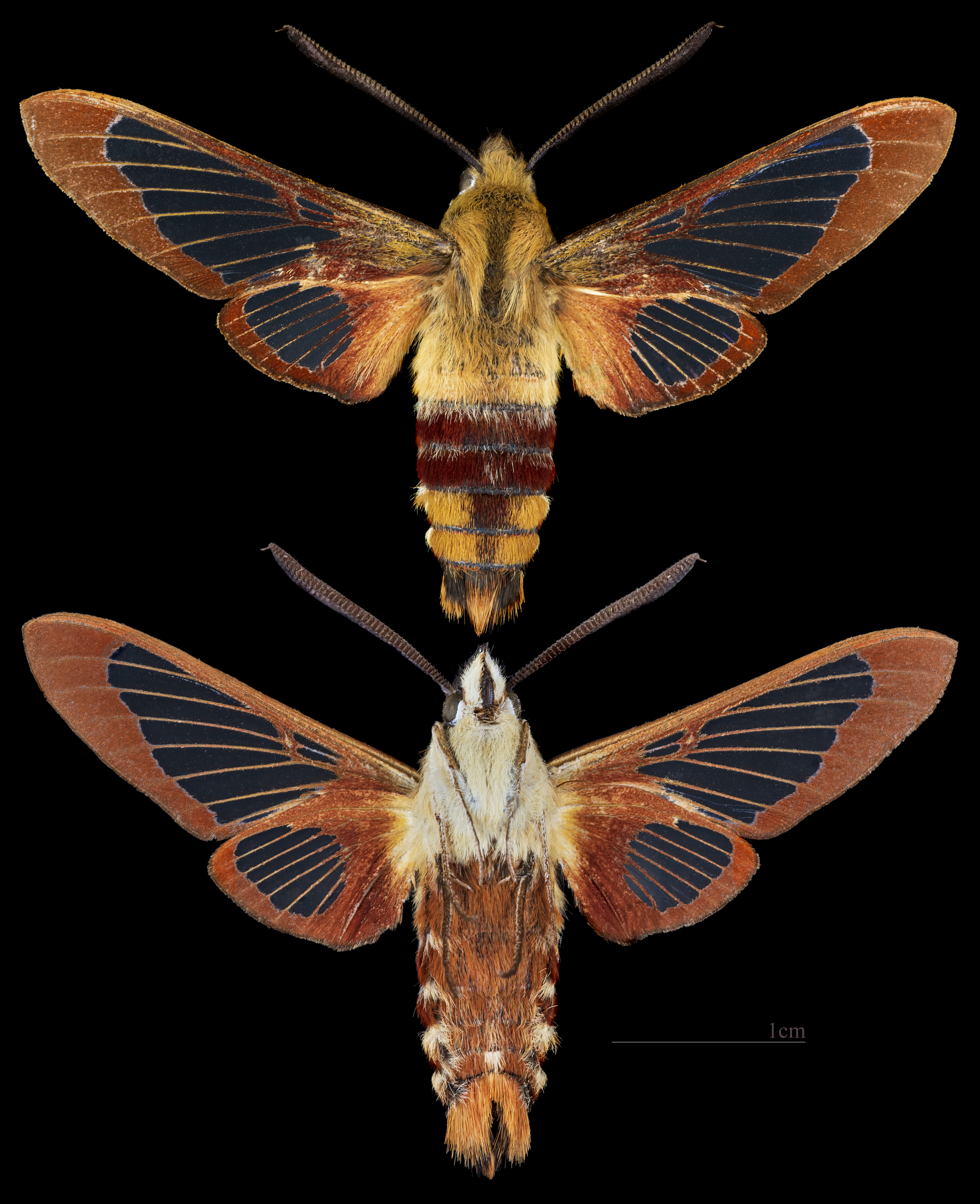
Hemaris thysbe

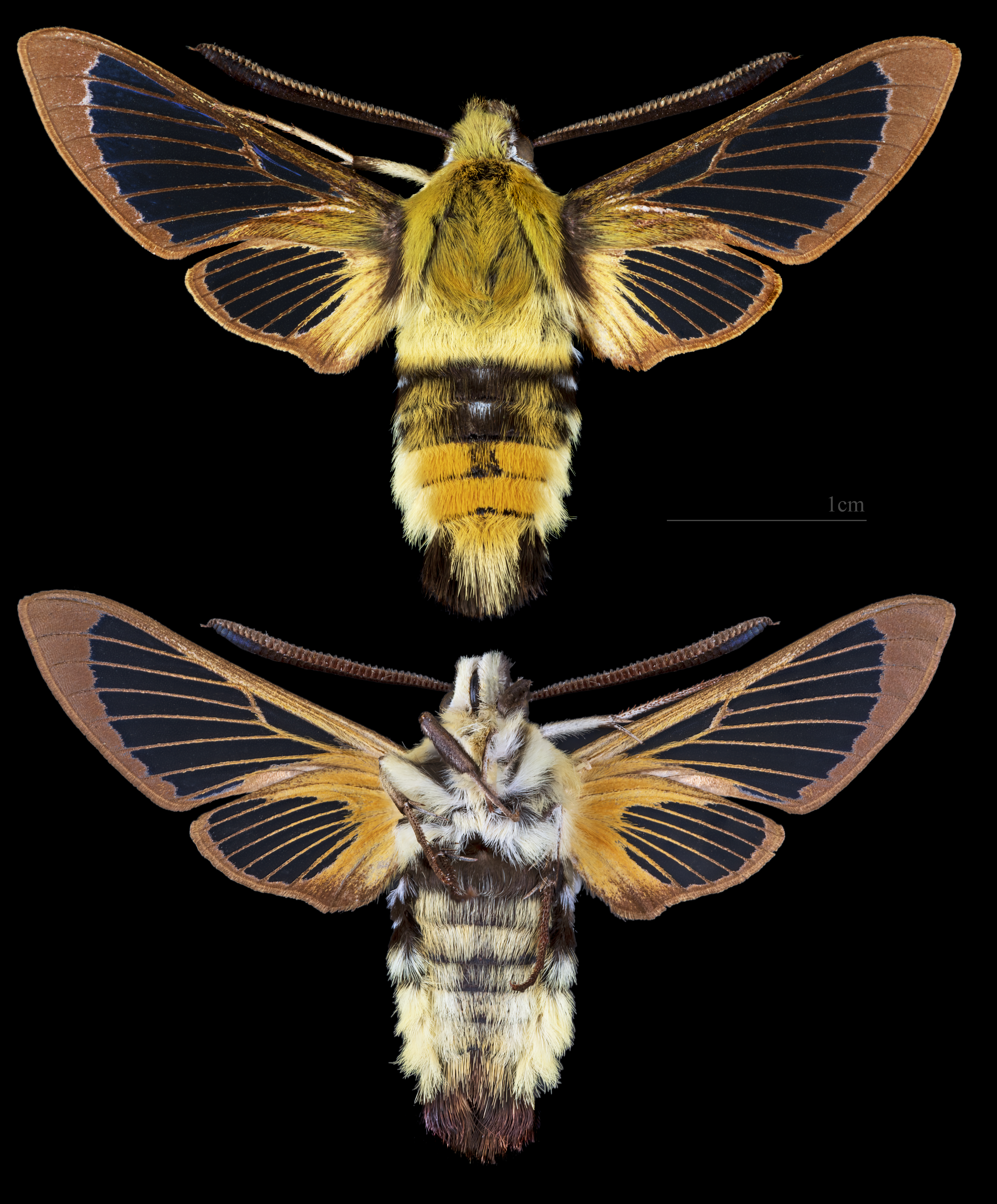
Hemaris tityus

== Gallery ==
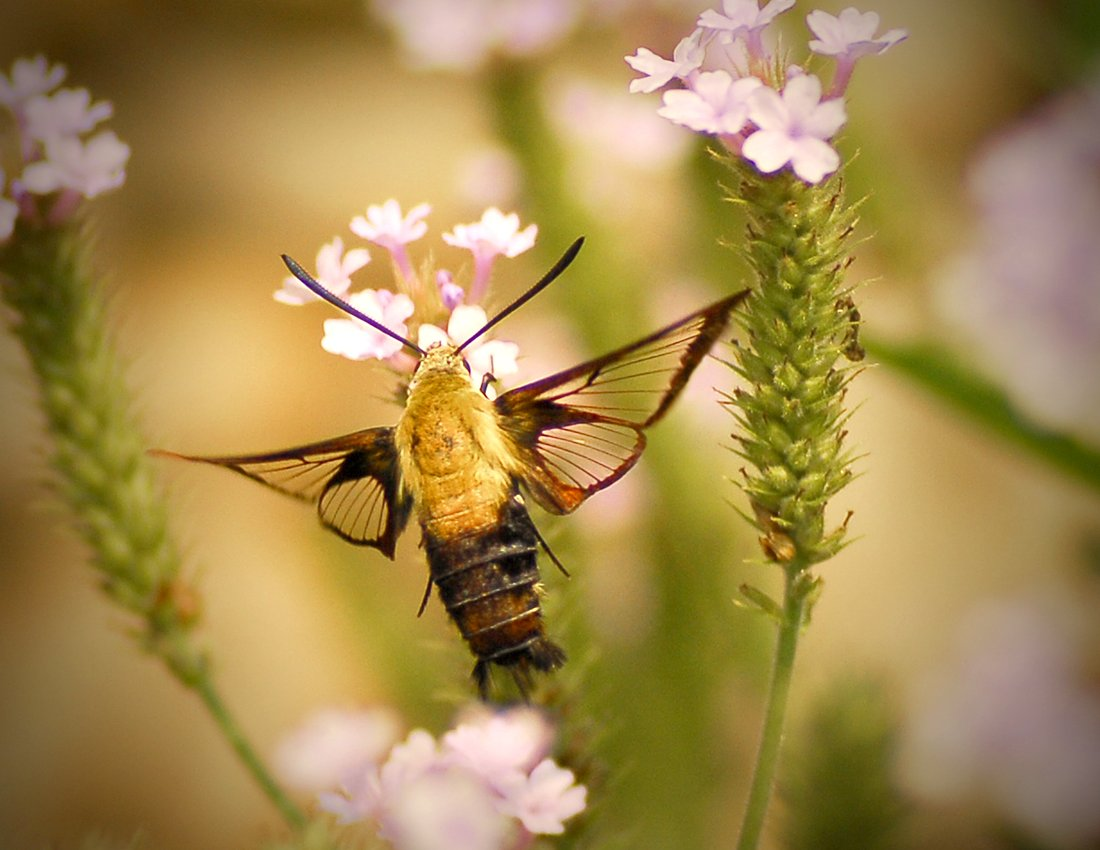
H. diffinis feeding

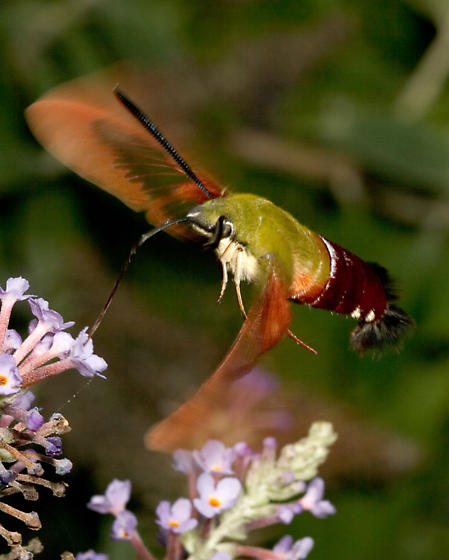
H. thysbe feeding

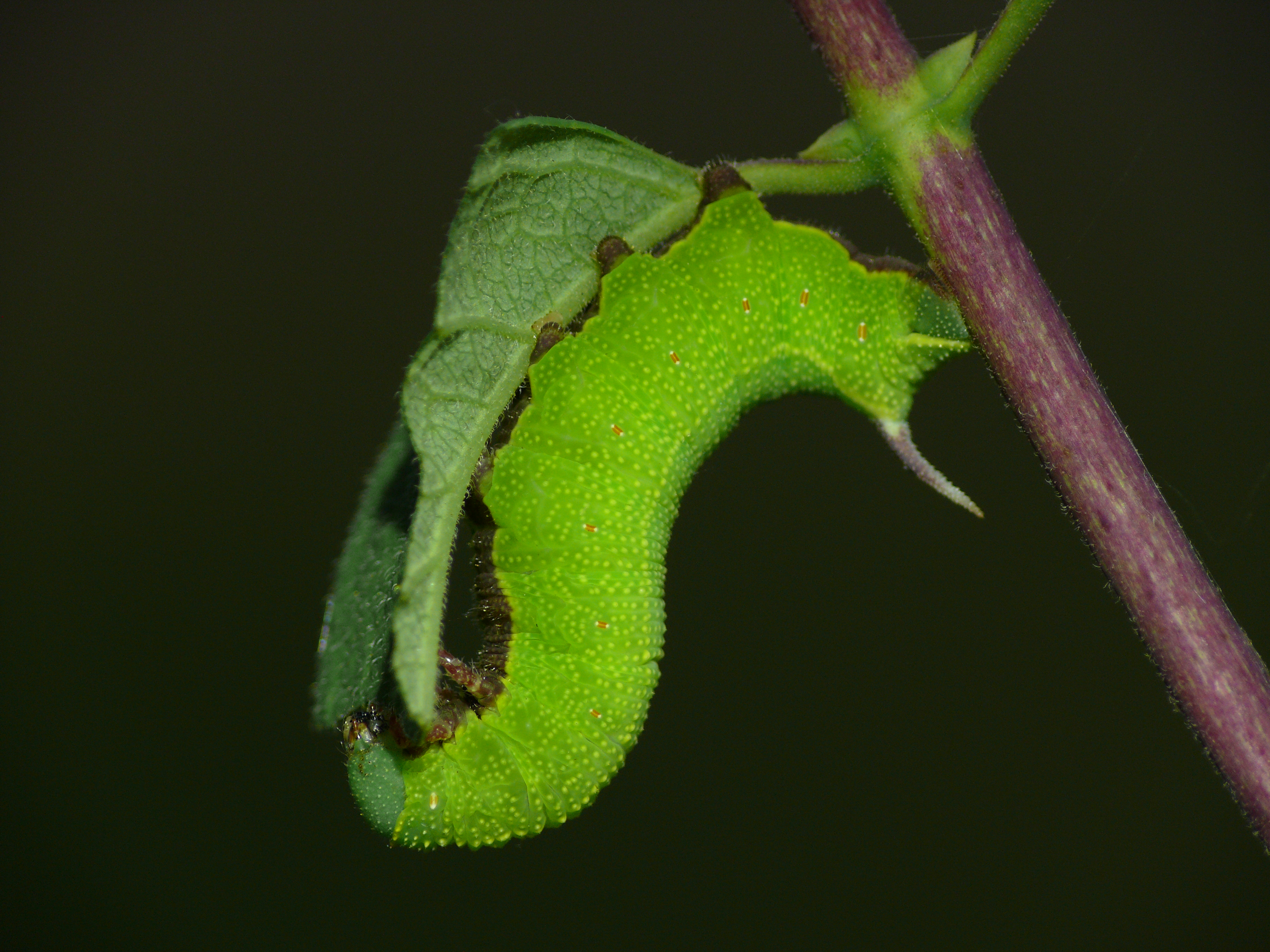
H. fuciformis caterpillar

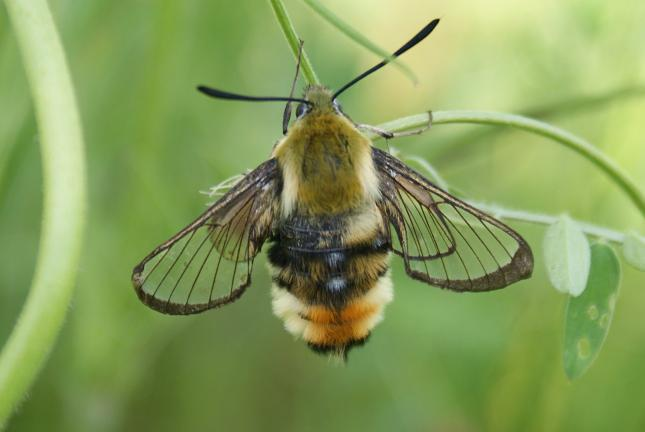
H. tityus
