= Hemaris syra =

Scientific classification
- Kingdom: Animalia
- Phylum: Arthropoda
- Class: Insecta
- Order: Lepidoptera
- Family: Sphingidae
- Genus: Hemaris
- Species: H. syra

Binomial name
- Hemaris syra (Daniel, 1939)

Synonyms
- Haemorrhagia syra Daniel, 1939

Species of moth

Hemaris syra, the broad-bordered bee hawkmoth, is a moth of the family Sphingidae. The species was first described by Franz Daniel in 1939. It is known from southern and eastern Turkey, the western Zagros Mountains and northern Alborz Mountains of Iran, the Kopet Dag mountains of Turkmenistan, western Jordan, and northern Israel.

The wingspan is 35–48 mm. It is a diurnal species. Adults are on wing from mid-May to mid-June, with a partial to full second generation in August.

The larvae probably feed on Lonicera species.
