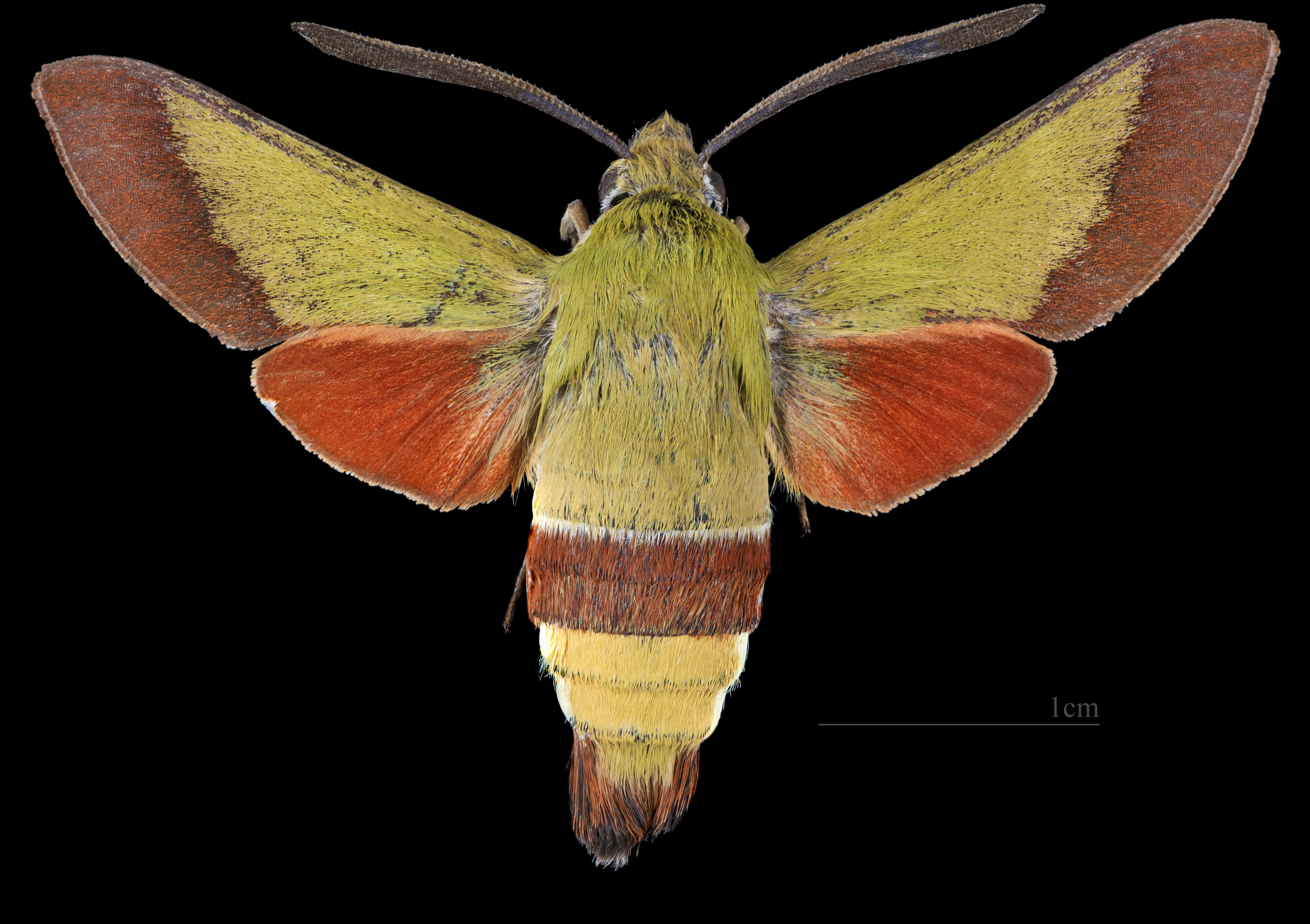
- Hemaris croatica ♂
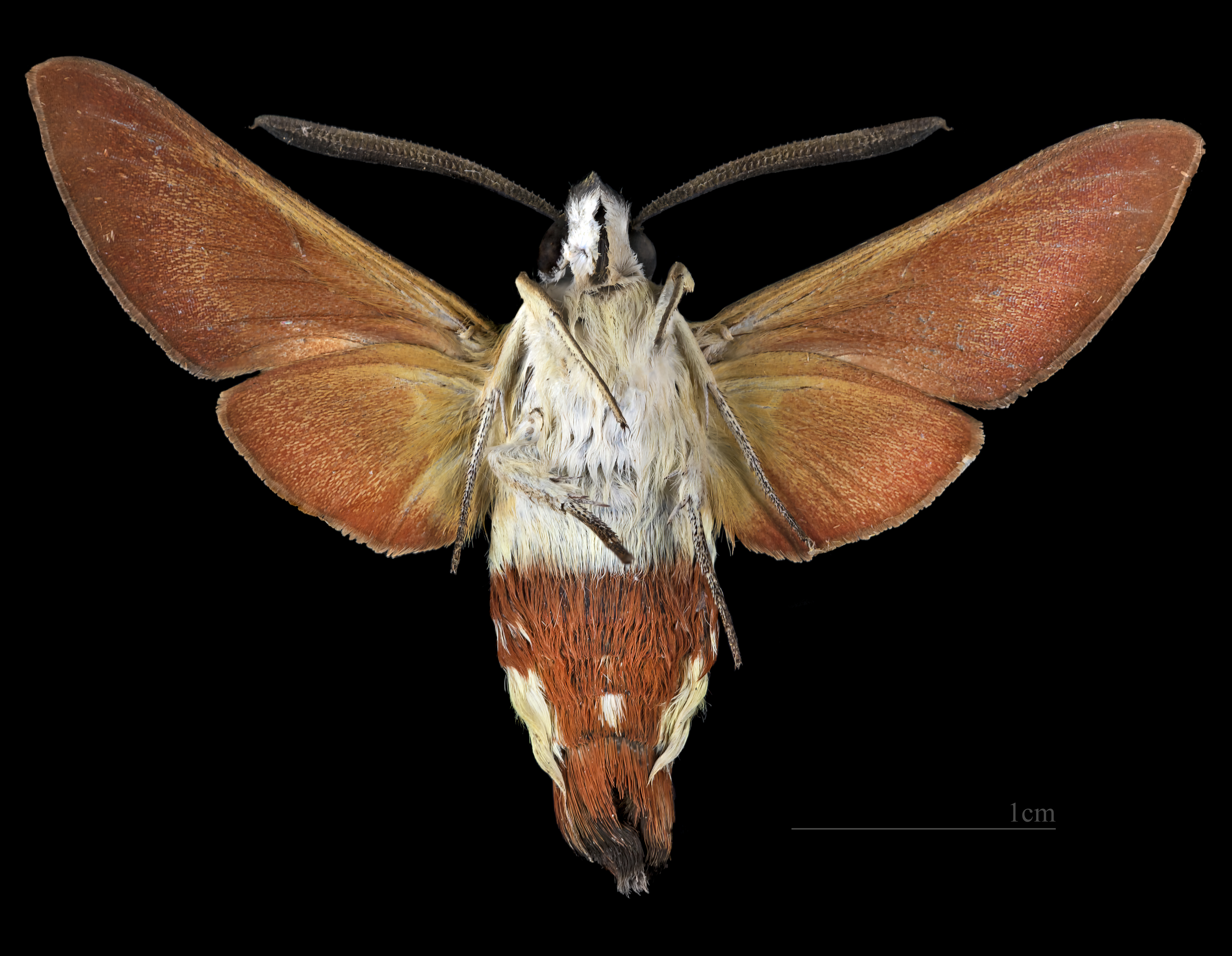
- Hemaris croatica ♂ △

Scientific classification
- Kingdom: Animalia
- Phylum: Arthropoda
- Clade: Pancrustacea
- Class: Insecta
- Order: Lepidoptera
- Family: Sphingidae
- Genus: Hemaris
- Species: H. croatica

Binomial name
- Hemaris croatica (Esper, 1800)

Synonyms
- Sphinx croatica Esper, 1800; Sphinx sesia Hübner, 1805; Hemaris croatica rangnowi (Closs, 1911); Haemorrhagia croatica obscurata (Closs, 1911)

= Hemaris croatica =

Species of moth

Hemaris croatica is a moth of the family Sphingidae. It was described by Eugenius Johann Christoph Esper in 1800.

== Distribution ==
It is found in Balkans, Anatolia and the Caucasus to Iran. Along the Mediterranean coast it is found up to northern Israel. There are local populations on the Crimea and in eastern Ukraine and western Kazakhstan.

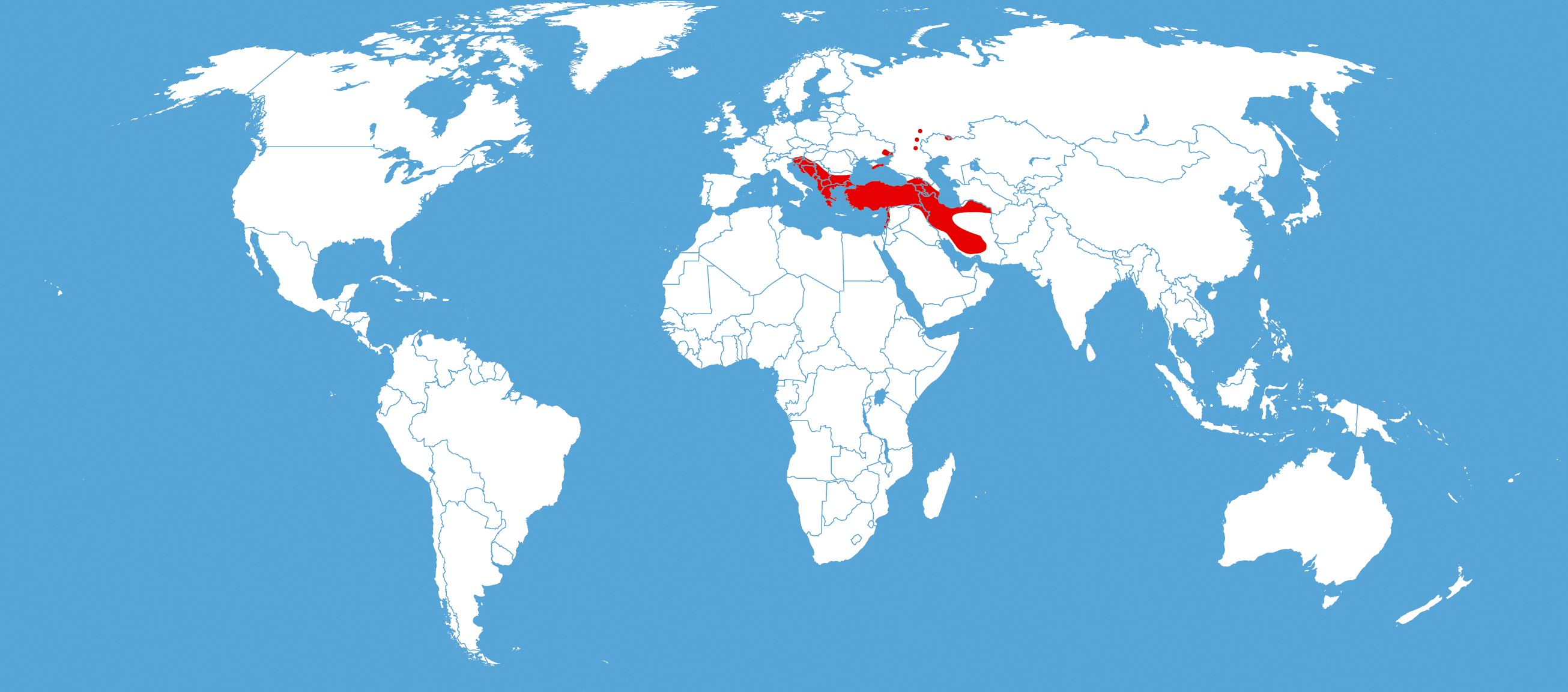

== Description ==
The wingspan is 36–64 millimetres (1.4–2.5 in) (H. croatica croatica) up to 65–71 millimetres (2.6–2.8 in) (H. croatica fahira). In the north and in mountainous areas it flies in one generation in July. In warm areas it flies in two generations from May to June and in August.

== Biology ==
The larvae have been recorded on Scabiosa, Cephalaria, and Asperula species.

== Subspecies ==
- Hemaris croatica croatica
- Hemaris croatica fahira de Freina, 2004 (Iran)
