= Hemaris molli =

Scientific classification
- Kingdom: Animalia
- Phylum: Arthropoda
- Class: Insecta
- Order: Lepidoptera
- Family: Sphingidae
- Genus: Hemaris
- Species: H. molli

Binomial name
- Hemaris molli Eitschberger, Müller & Kravchenko, 2005

Species of moth

Hemaris molli is a moth of the family Sphingidae. The species was first described by Ulf Eitschberger, Günter C. Müller and Vasiliy D. Kravchenko in 2005. It is known from Jordan.
