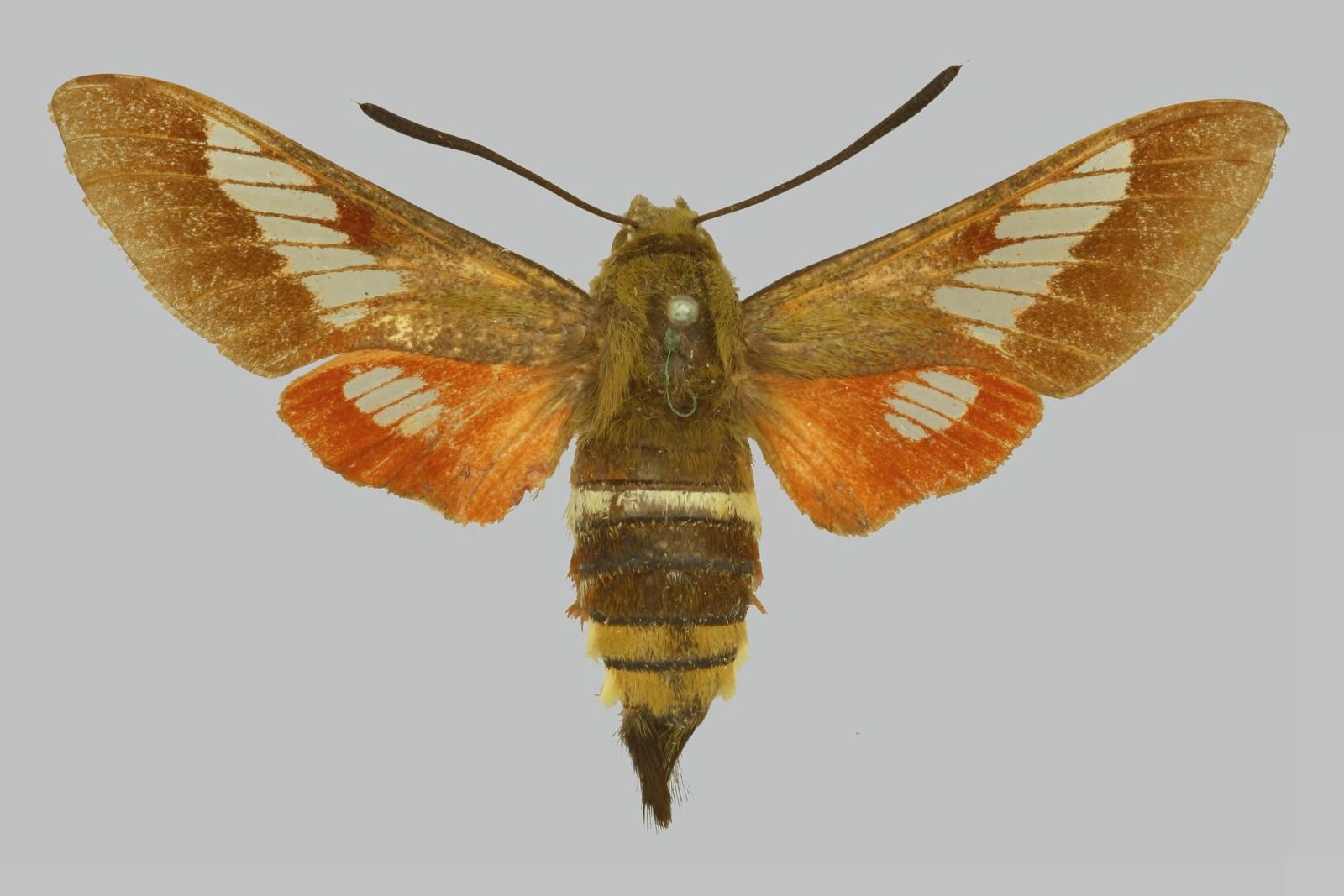

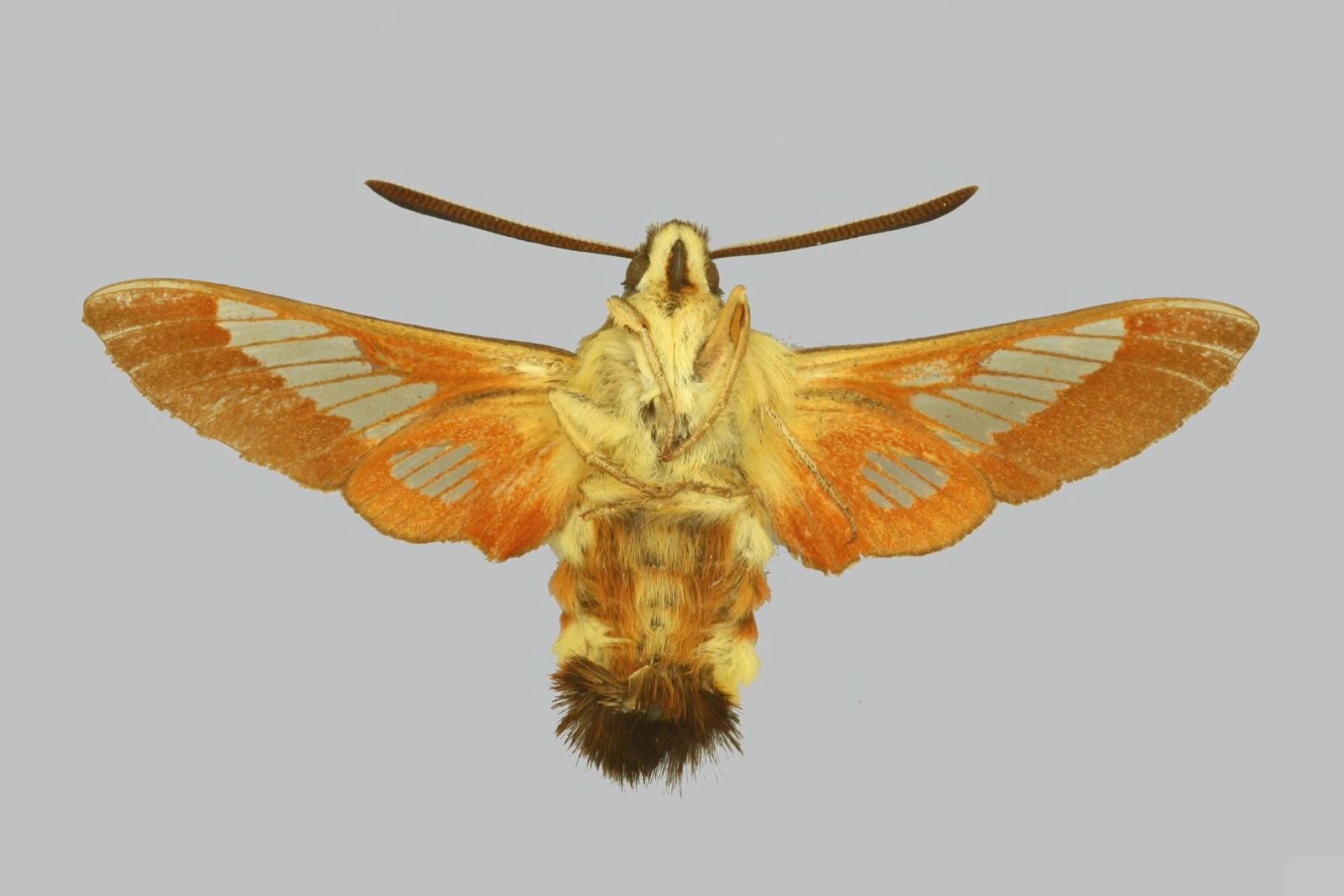
- Female (dorsal) and male (ventral view)

Scientific classification
- Kingdom: Animalia
- Phylum: Arthropoda
- Class: Insecta
- Order: Lepidoptera
- Family: Sphingidae
- Genus: Hemaris
- Species: H. ducalis

Binomial name
- Hemaris ducalis (Staudinger, 1887)

Synonyms
- Macroglossa ducalis Staudinger, 1887; Macroglossa temiri Grum-Grshimailo, 1887; Hemaris ducalis dantchenkoi Eitschberger & Lukhtanov, 1996; Hemaris ducalis efenestralis (Derzhavets, 1984)

= Hemaris ducalis =

Species of moth

Hemaris ducalis, the Pamir bee hawkmoth, is a moth of the family Sphingidae. It is known from the mountains of south-western Xinjiang in China, the western Tian Shan, southern and eastern Kazakhstan up to the Altai Mountains, western Mongolia, southern Uzbekistan, Kyrgyzstan, Tajikistan, northern Afghanistan and Pakistan.

The wingspan is 40–50 mm. It can be distinguished from all other Hemaris species by the off-white dorsal band on abdominal segment three. The degree of development of the transparent areas on both the forewing and hindwing is variable. The hindwing upperside is entirely orange, apart from the transparent areas, contrasting with the more brown coloration of the forewing upperside.

It is a diurnal species. It is found in woodland and scrub, rarely below 2,300 meters and occurring up to 6,200 meters.

The larvae have been recorded feeding on Lonicera species.

== Subspecies ==
- Hemaris ducalis subsp. ducalis
- Hemaris ducalis subsp. lukhtanovi Eitschberger, Danner & Surholt, 1998 (Pakistan)
