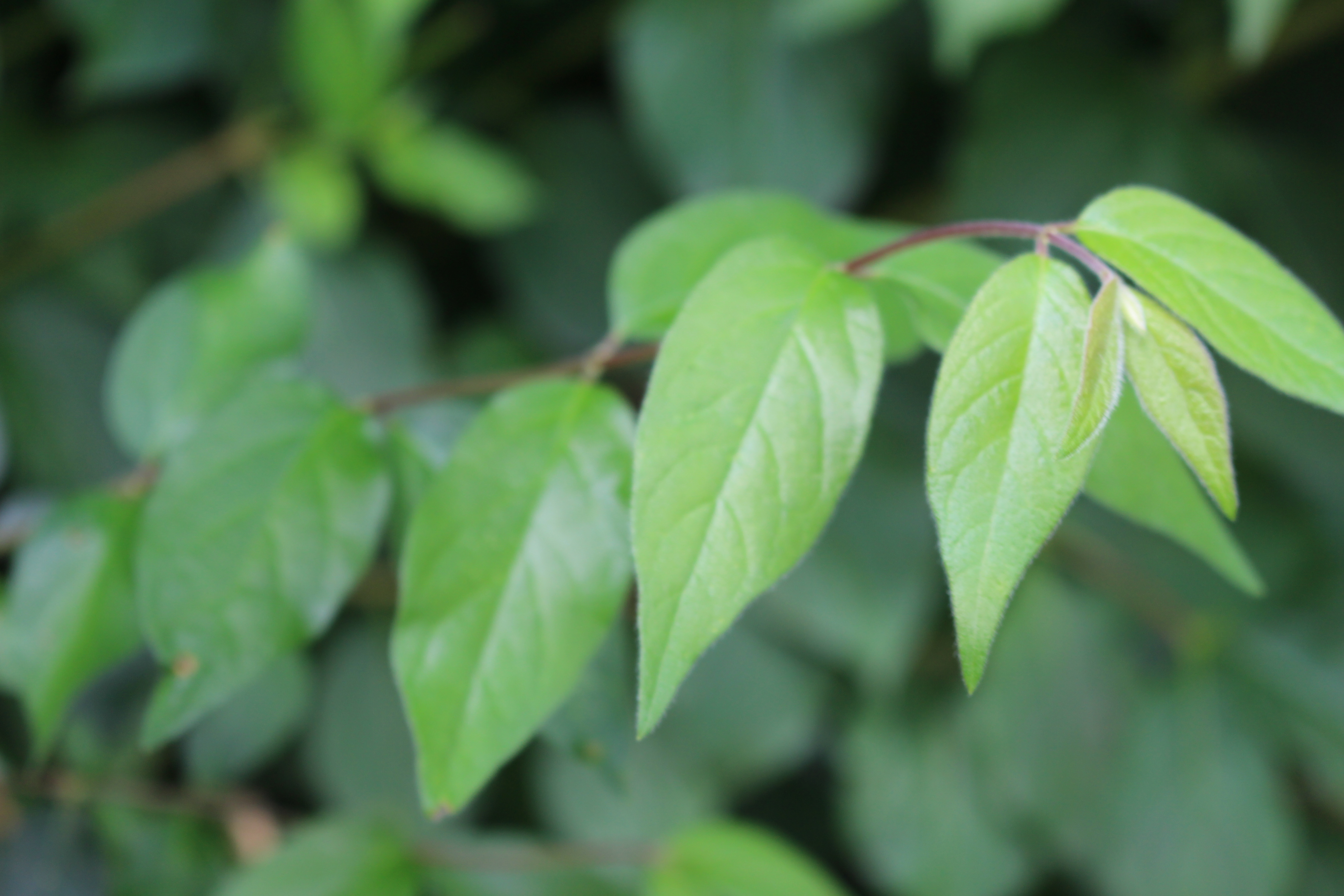
- Leaves

Scientific classification
- Kingdom: Plantae
- Clade: Tracheophytes
- Clade: Angiosperms
- Clade: Eudicots
- Clade: Asterids
- Order: Dipsacales
- Family: Caprifoliaceae
- Genus: Lonicera
- Species: L. quinquelocularis

Binomial name
- Lonicera quinquelocularis Hardw.

= Lonicera quinquelocularis =

Translucent honeysuckle

Species of honeysuckle

Lonicera quinquelocularis, known as translucent honeysuckle, is a species of honeysuckle native to Afghanistan and China, where it reaches a height of 5 metres. The cream-white to yellow flowers occur from May to July, followed by translucent to milky coloured fruits.
