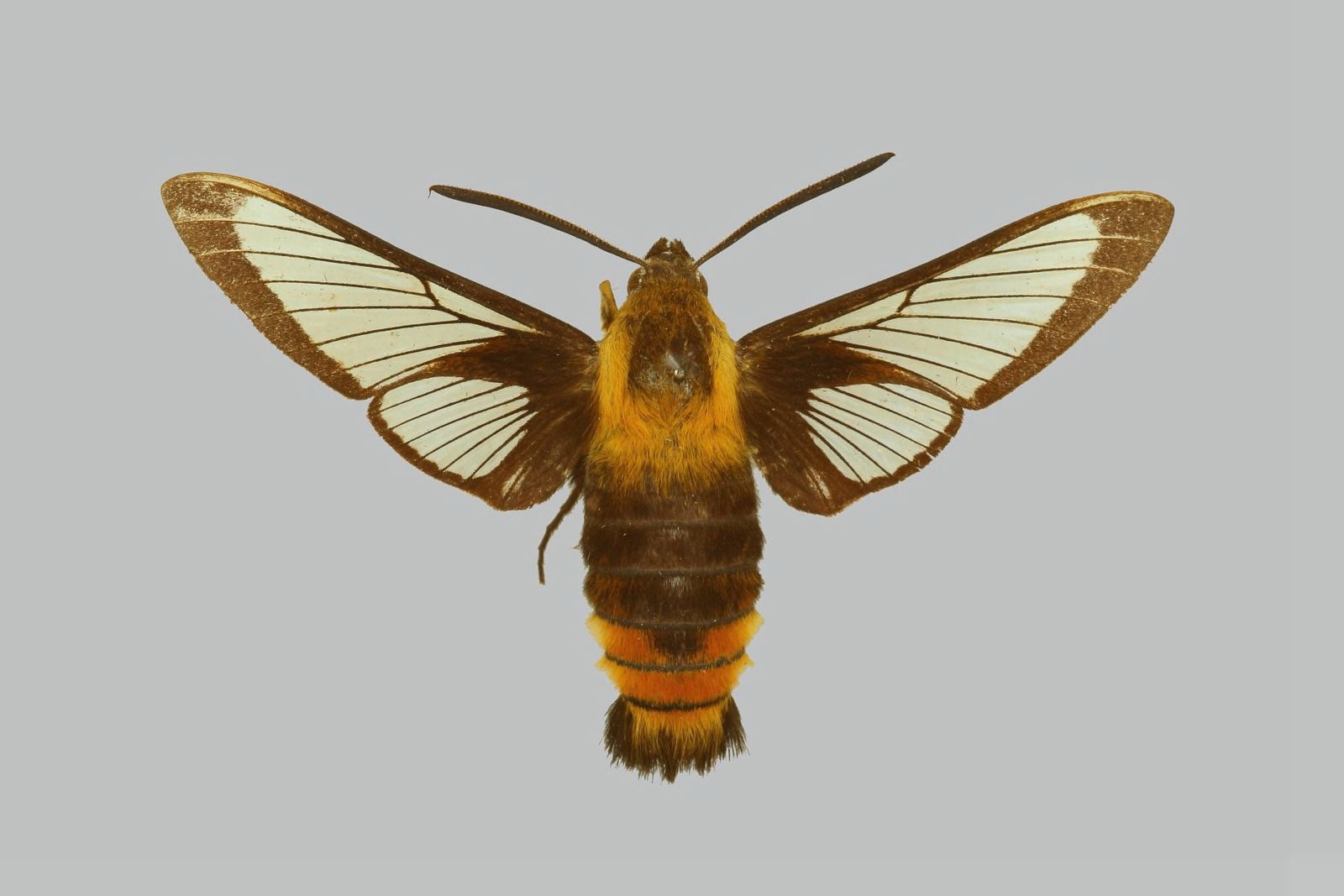

Scientific classification
- Kingdom: Animalia
- Phylum: Arthropoda
- Class: Insecta
- Order: Lepidoptera
- Family: Sphingidae
- Genus: Hemaris
- Species: H. staudingeri

Binomial name
- Hemaris staudingeri Leech, 1890

Synonyms
- Haemorrhagia staudingeri kuangtungensis Mell, 1922; Hemaris staudingeri nigra Clark, 1922

= Hemaris staudingeri =

Species of moth

Hemaris staudingeri is a moth of the family Sphingidae. It is found from eastern and central China north to the southern part of the Russian Far East.

The wingspan is 37–40 mm. The anterior half of the abdomen is blackish dorsally, contrasting strongly with the posterior segments. The base of the forewing upperside is black or nearly black. The transparent discal cell is not divided longitudinally by a scaled fold. The base of the hindwing upperside is also black or nearly black.

There are two generations per year in China, with adults on wing from April to July/August.

The larvae have been recorded feeding on Lonicera species.
