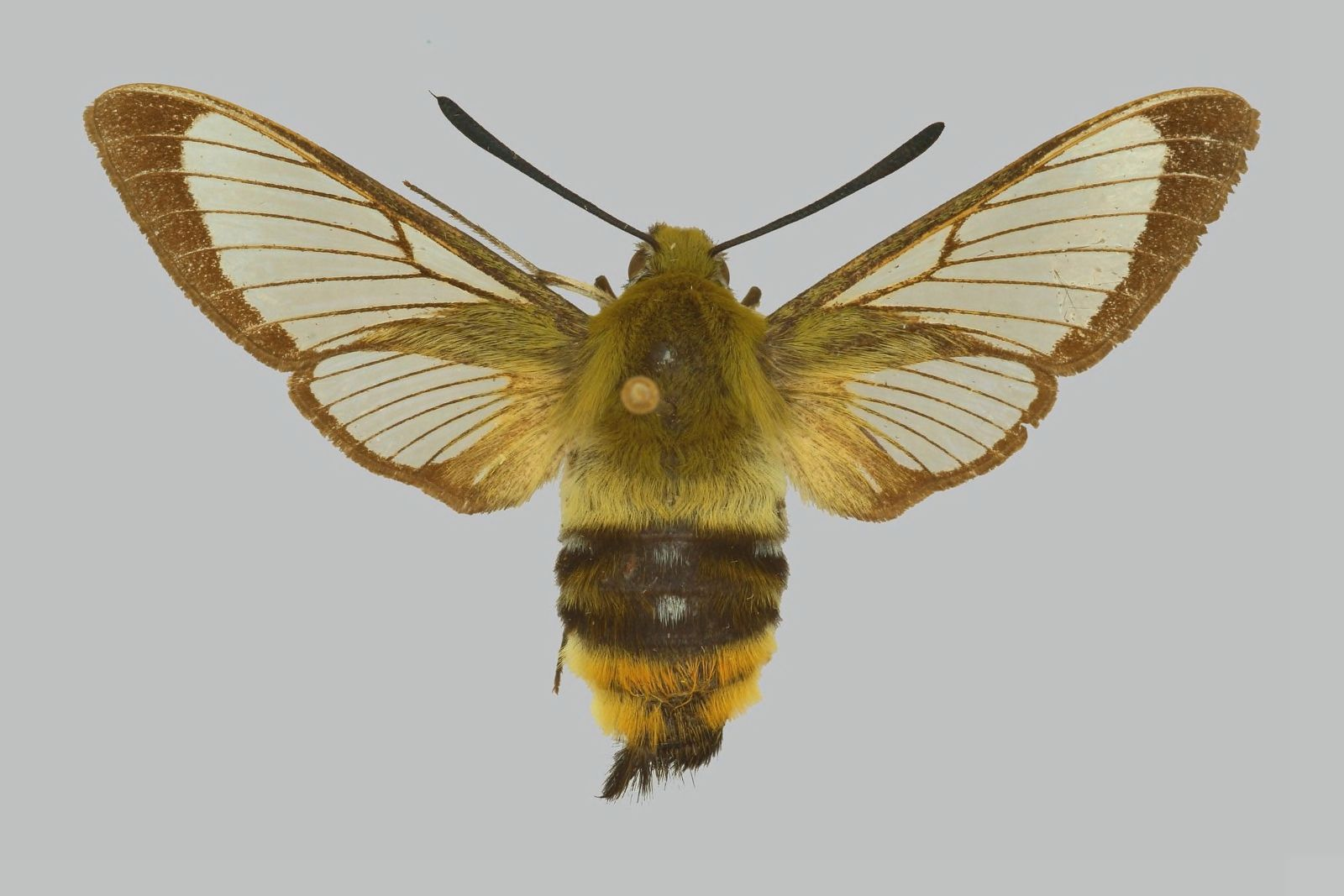

Scientific classification
- Domain: Eukaryota
- Kingdom: Animalia
- Phylum: Arthropoda
- Class: Insecta
- Order: Lepidoptera
- Family: Sphingidae
- Genus: Hemaris
- Species: H. aksana

Binomial name
- Hemaris aksana (Le Cerf, 1923)

Synonyms
- Haemorrhagia aksana Le Cerf, 1923

= Hemaris aksana =

Species of moth

Hemaris aksana, the Atlas bee hawkmoth, is a moth of the family Sphingidae. The species was first described by Ferdinand Le Cerf in 1923. It is known from the Middle and High Atlas Mountains of Morocco. The habitat consists of flower-rich meadows at elevations between 1,300 and 2,500 meters.

The wingspan is 44–51 mm.

The larvae have been recorded feeding on Scabiosa species.
