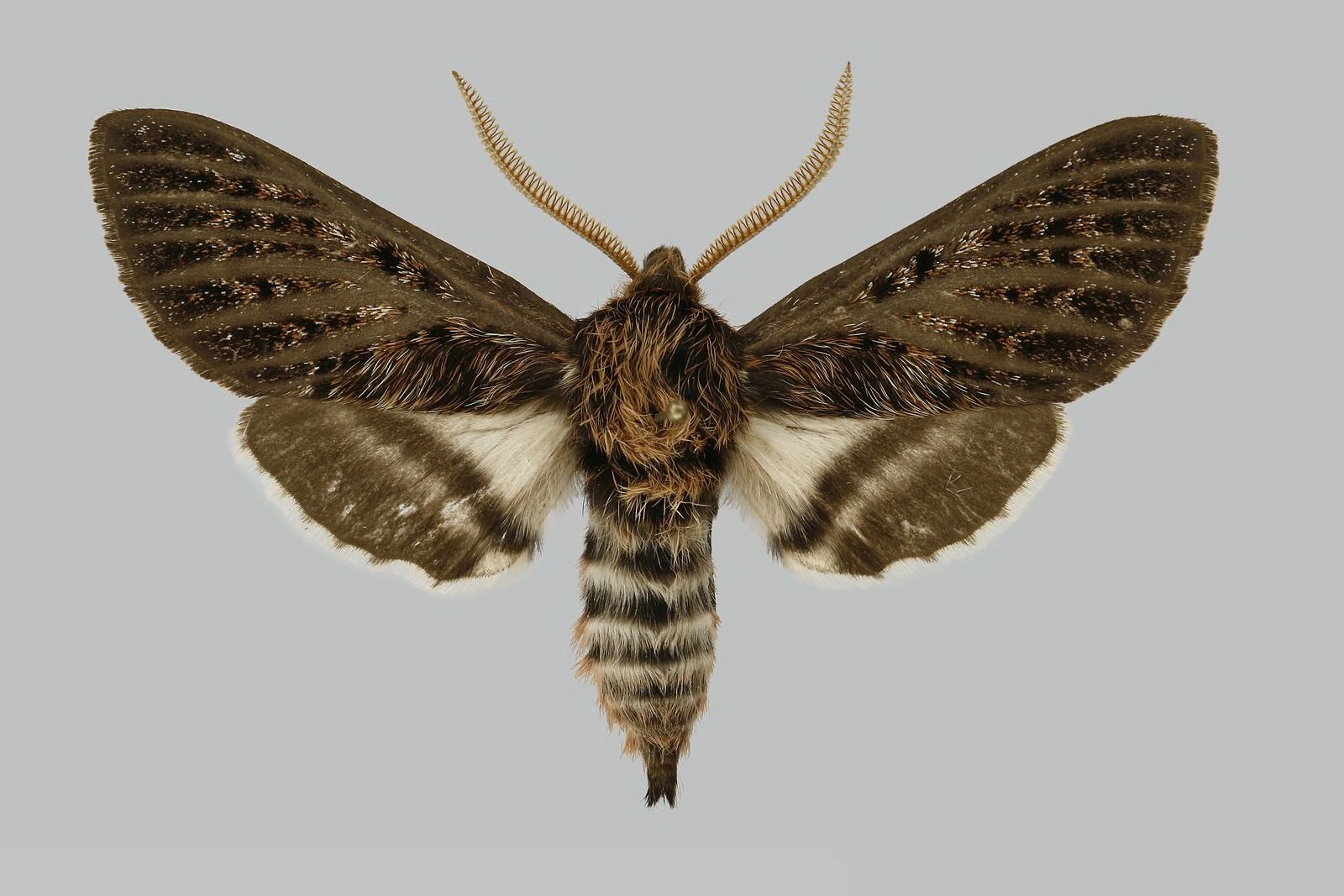

Scientific classification
- Kingdom: Animalia
- Phylum: Arthropoda
- Clade: Pancrustacea
- Class: Insecta
- Order: Lepidoptera
- Family: Sphingidae
- Subfamily: Smerinthinae
- Tribe: Sphingulini
- Genus: Monarda; H. Druce, 1896
- Species: M. oryx

Binomial name
- Monarda oryx H. Druce, 1896

= Monarda oryx =

Species of moth

Monarda is a monotypic moth genus in the family Sphingidae. Its only species, Monarda oryx, is known from Mexico. Both the genus and species were described by Herbert Druce in 1896.

The scales and most of the hairs on the forewing upperside are deep rusty brown, except at the costal and distal margins and upon the veins, which are olive. There are two interrupted black antemedian bands and two discal series of black chevrons as well as a series of black postdiscal spots. There are no rusty brown scales on the forewing underside.

Adults are on wing in July.

The larvae have been recorded feeding on Ipomoea stans.
