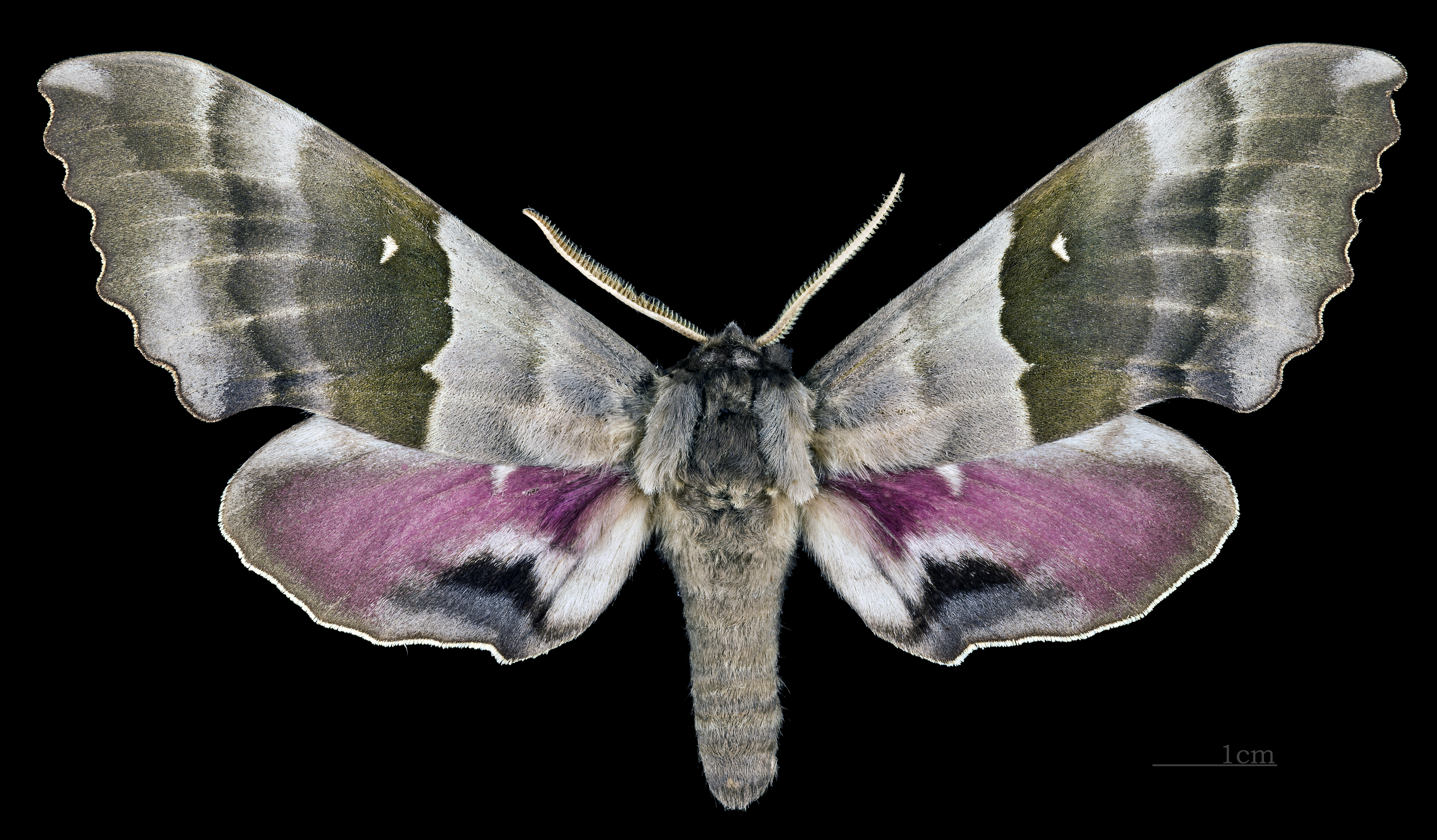
- Pachysphinx occidentalis

Scientific classification
- Domain: Eukaryota
- Kingdom: Animalia
- Phylum: Arthropoda
- Class: Insecta
- Order: Lepidoptera
- Family: Sphingidae
- Subfamily: Smerinthinae
- Tribe: Smerinthini
- Genus: Pachysphinx; Rothschild & Jordan, 1903

= Pachysphinx =

Genus of moths

Pachysphinx is a genus of moths in the family Sphingidae first described by Walter Rothschild and Karl Jordan in 1903.

== Species ==
- Pachysphinx modesta (Harris 1839)
- Pachysphinx occidentalis (Edwards 1875)
- Pachysphinx peninsularis Cary, 1963
