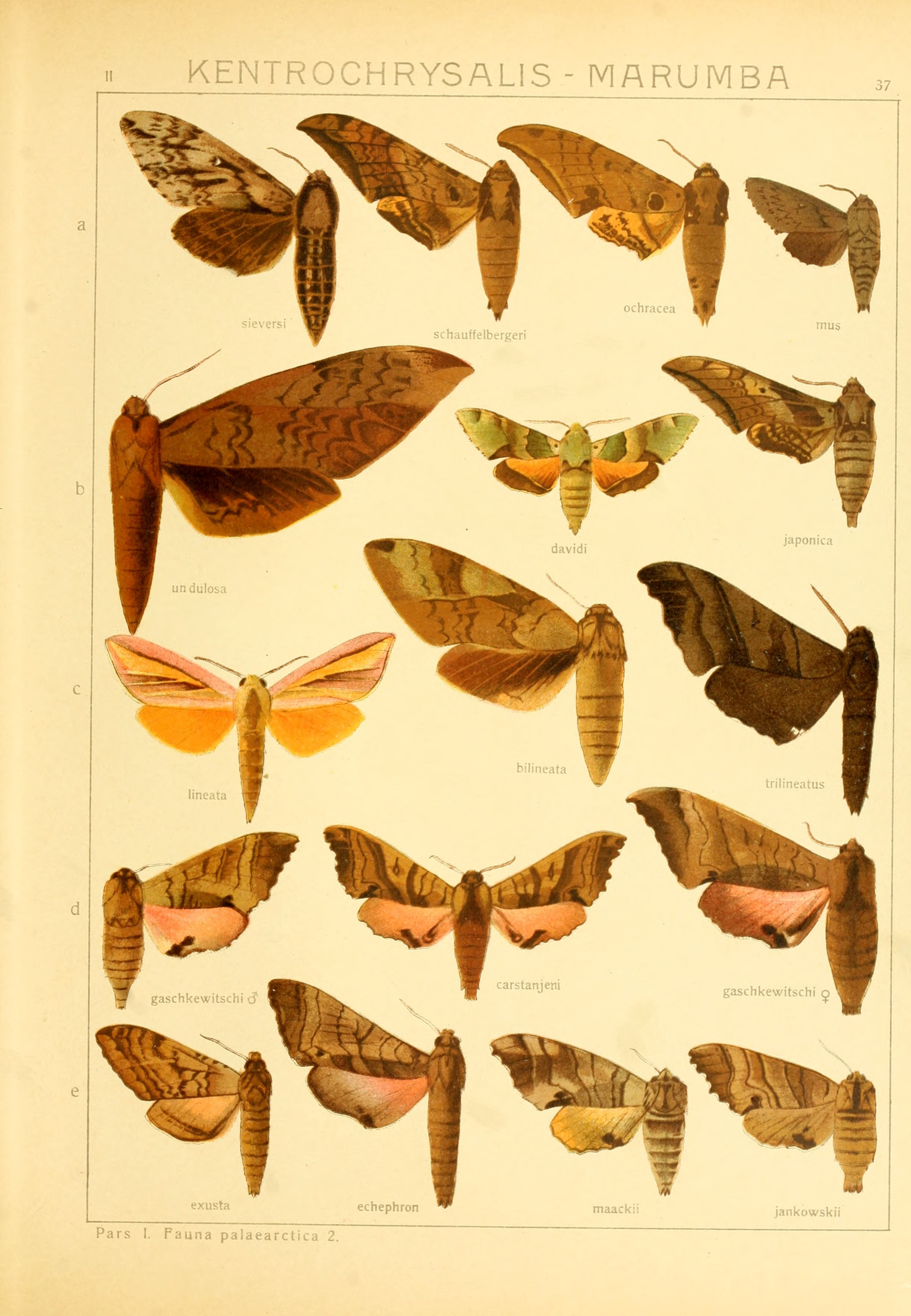
- Kentrochrysalis sieversi in Seitz

Scientific classification
- Domain: Eukaryota
- Kingdom: Animalia
- Phylum: Arthropoda
- Class: Insecta
- Order: Lepidoptera
- Family: Sphingidae
- Genus: Kentrochrysalis
- Species: K. sieversi

Binomial name
- Kentrochrysalis sieversi Alphéraky, 1897

Synonyms
- Kentrochrysalis sieversi houlberti Oberthür, 1920

= Kentrochrysalis sieversi =

Species of moth

Kentrochrysalis sieversi is a species of moth of the family Sphingidae. It is known from the southern part of the Russian Far East, north-eastern China and South Korea.

The wingspan is 88–90 mm. Adults are on wing from mid-May to mid-August in Korea.

The larvae have been recorded feeding on Fraxinus species in Primorskiy Kray.
