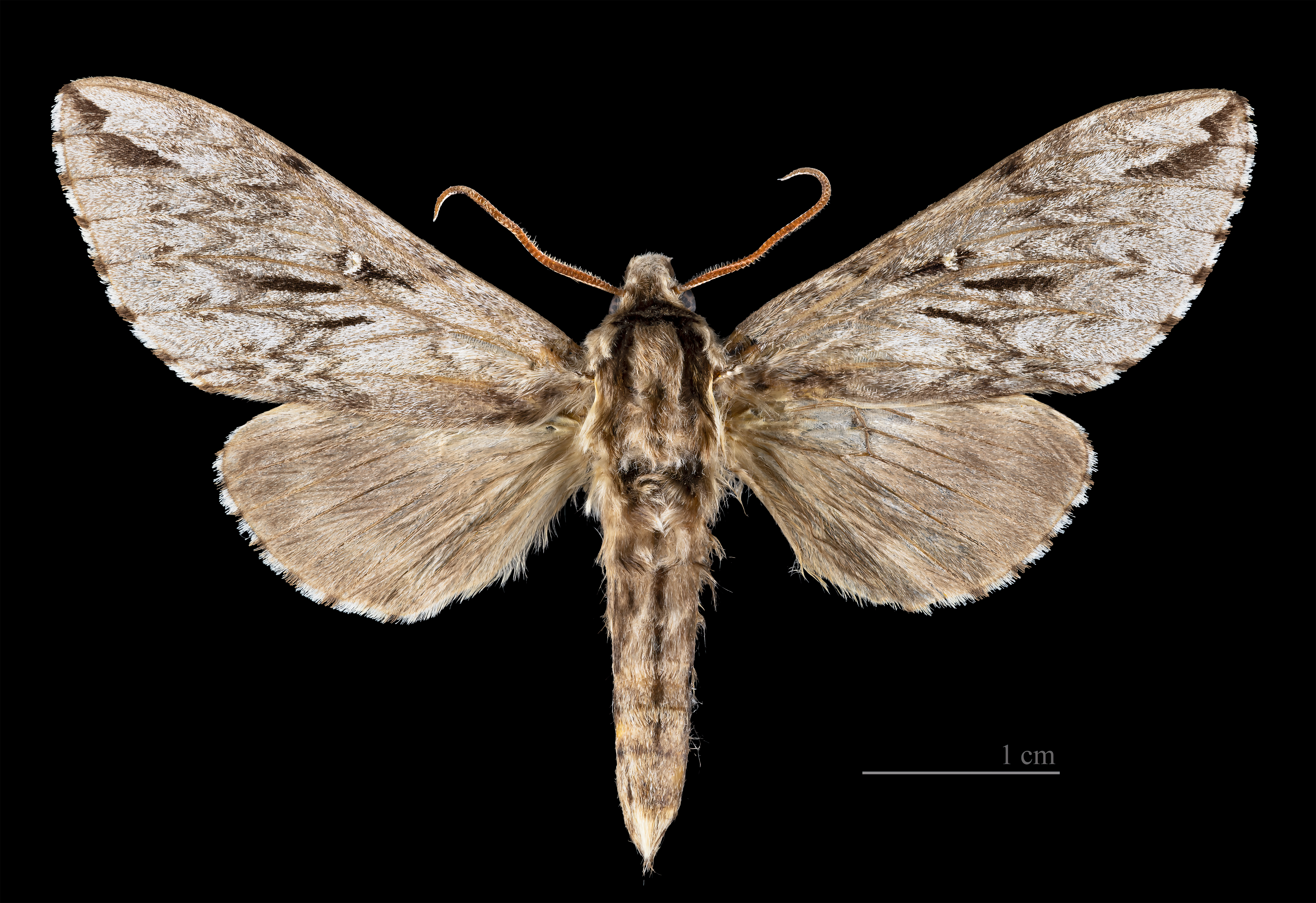
- Kentrochrysalis streckeri

Scientific classification
- Domain: Eukaryota
- Kingdom: Animalia
- Phylum: Arthropoda
- Class: Insecta
- Order: Lepidoptera
- Family: Sphingidae
- Tribe: Sphingulini
- Genus: Kentrochrysalis; Staudinger, 1877

Synonyms
- Centrochrysalis Kuznetsov, 1906

= Kentrochrysalis =

Genus of moths

Kentrochrysalis is a genus of moths in the family Sphingidae. The genus was erected by Otto Staudinger in 1877.

== Species ==
- Kentrochrysalis consimilis (Rothschild & Jordan 1903)
- Kentrochrysalis heberti Haxaire & Melichar, 2010
- Kentrochrysalis sieversi Alpheraky 1897
- Kentrochrysalis streckeri (Staudinger 1880)
