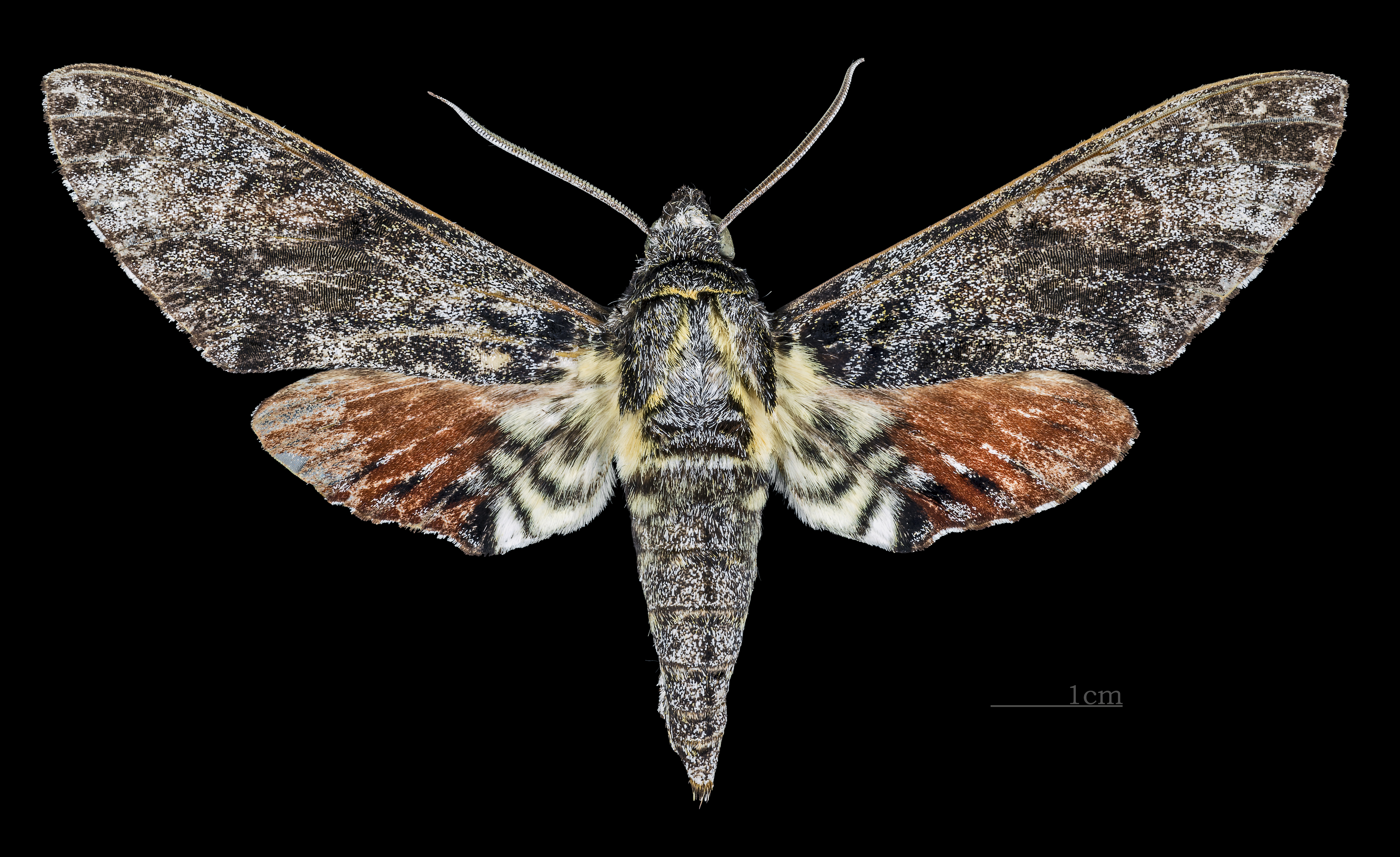
- Tetrachroa edwardsi

Scientific classification
- Kingdom: Animalia
- Phylum: Arthropoda
- Class: Insecta
- Order: Lepidoptera
- Family: Sphingidae
- Tribe: Sphingulini
- Genus: Tetrachroa; Rothschild & Jordan, 1903
- Species: T. edwardsi

Binomial name
- Tetrachroa edwardsi (Olliff, 1890)

Synonyms
- Macrosila edwardsi Olliff, 1890; Meganoton variegatum Rothschild, 1895

= Tetrachroa =

Genus of moths

Tetrachroa is a genus of moths in the family Sphingidae, containing only one species, Tetrachroa edwardsi, which is known from Queensland and New South Wales.
