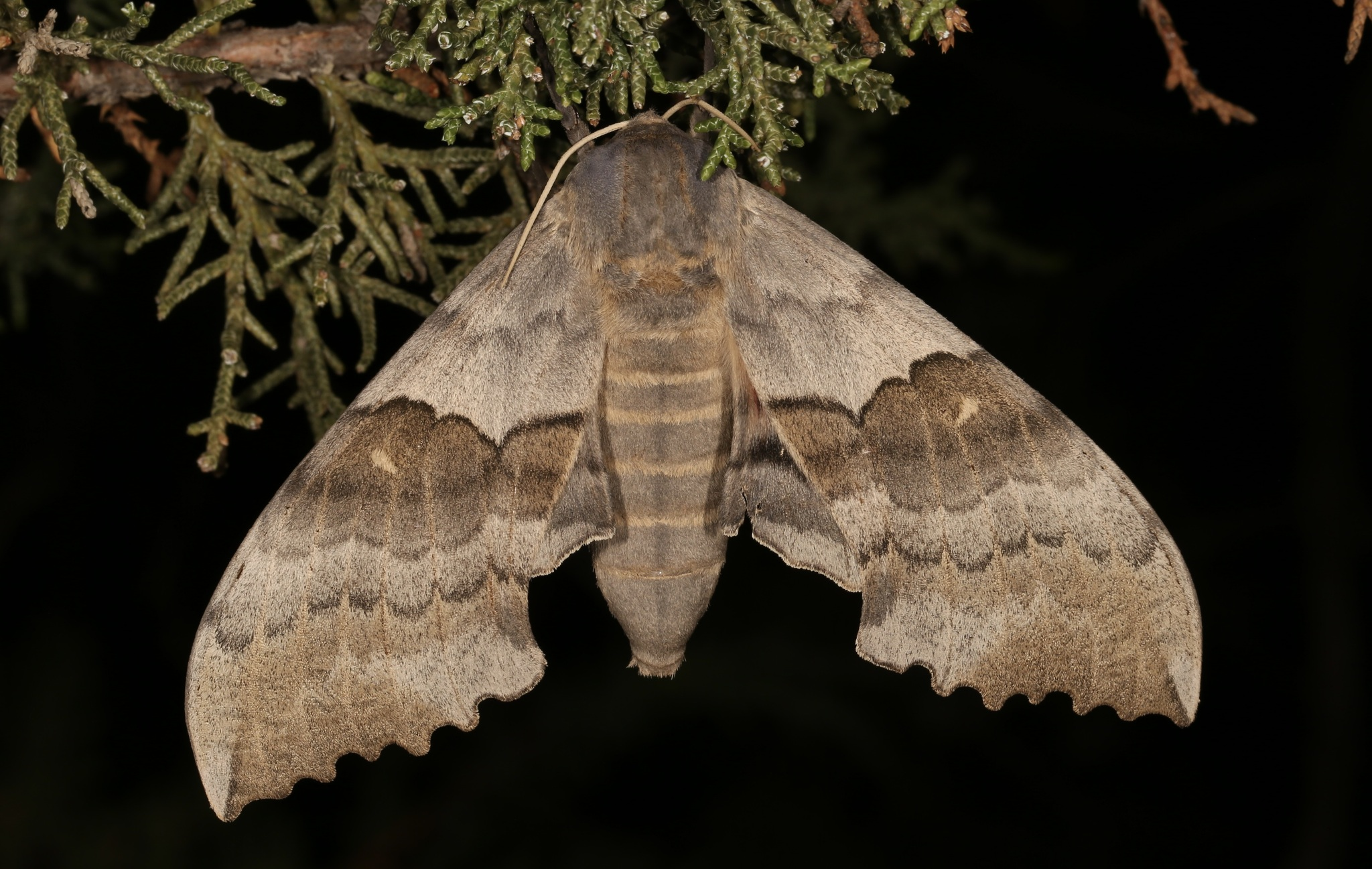

Scientific classification
- Domain: Eukaryota
- Kingdom: Animalia
- Phylum: Arthropoda
- Class: Insecta
- Order: Lepidoptera
- Family: Sphingidae
- Genus: Pachysphinx
- Species: P. occidentalis

Binomial name
- Pachysphinx occidentalis (H. Edwards, 1875)

Synonyms
- Smerinthus occidentalis Edwards, 1875; Pachysphinx imperator (Strecker, 1878); Pachysphinx modesta kunzei Rothschild & Jordan, 1903

= Pachysphinx occidentalis =

Big poplar sphinx

Species of moth

Pachysphinx occidentalis, the big poplar sphinx, is a moth of the family Sphingidae. The species was first described by Henry Edwards in 1875. It lives throughout Canada and the United States. The habitat consists of riparian areas and suburbs.

The wingspan is 130–150 mm. There are two color forms, a pale form with yellow-brown forewings, which are dark gray in the dark form. The lines and bands are well defined. The upperside of the hindwing has a crimson patch covering varying amounts of the wing, and two dark lines which do not form a distinct triangle.

There are two generations per year in southern Arizona with adults on wing from May to September. Farther north, there is one generation per year with adults on wing from June to August.

The larvae feed on cottonwood Populus and Salix species.

== Subspecies ==
- Pachysphinx occidentalis occidentalis (from Alberta and North Dakota west to eastern Washington, south to Texas, Arizona, southern California, and Baja California Norte)
- Pachysphinx occidentalis regalis Rothschild & Jordan, 1903 (Mexico)

== Gallery ==
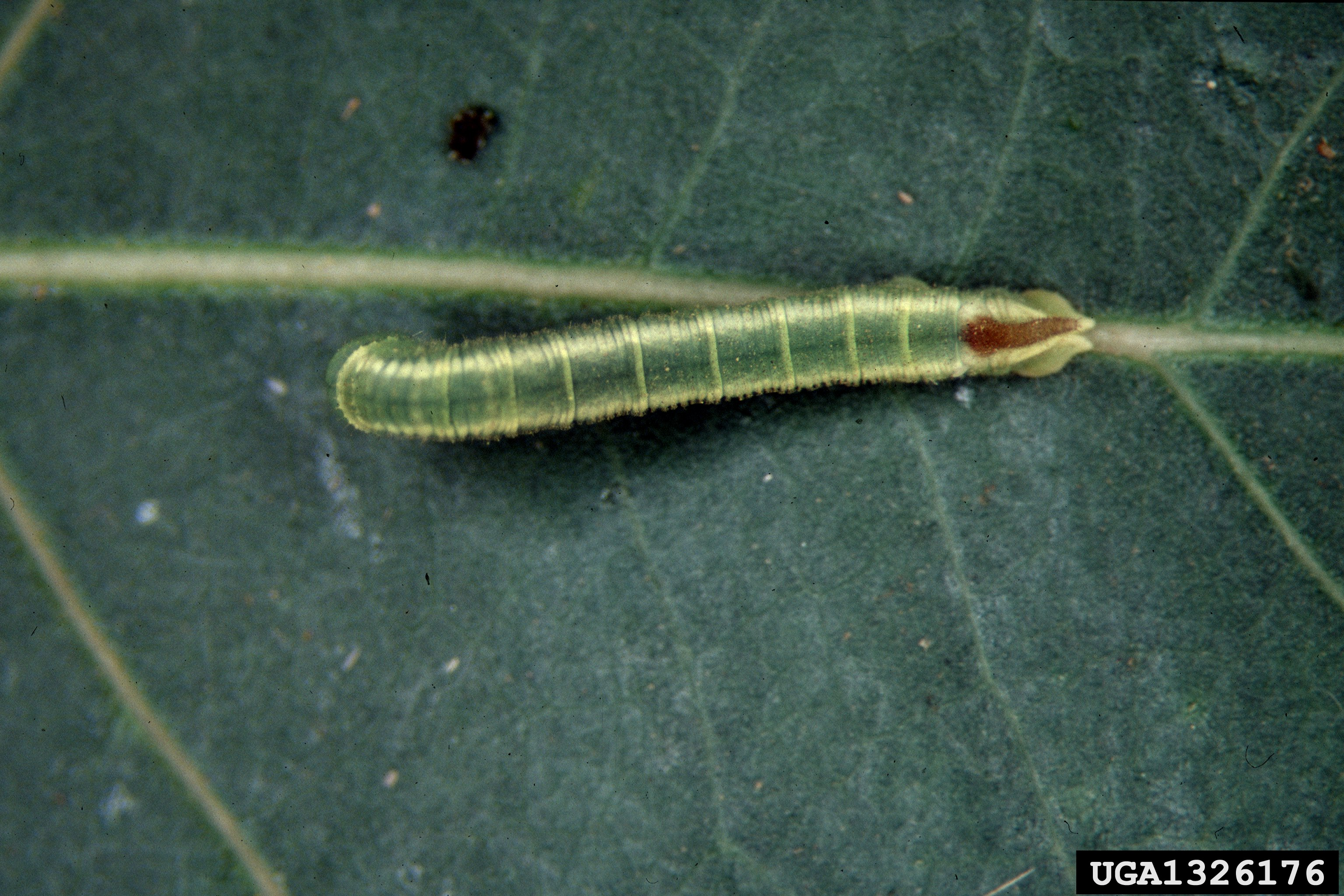
Young larva

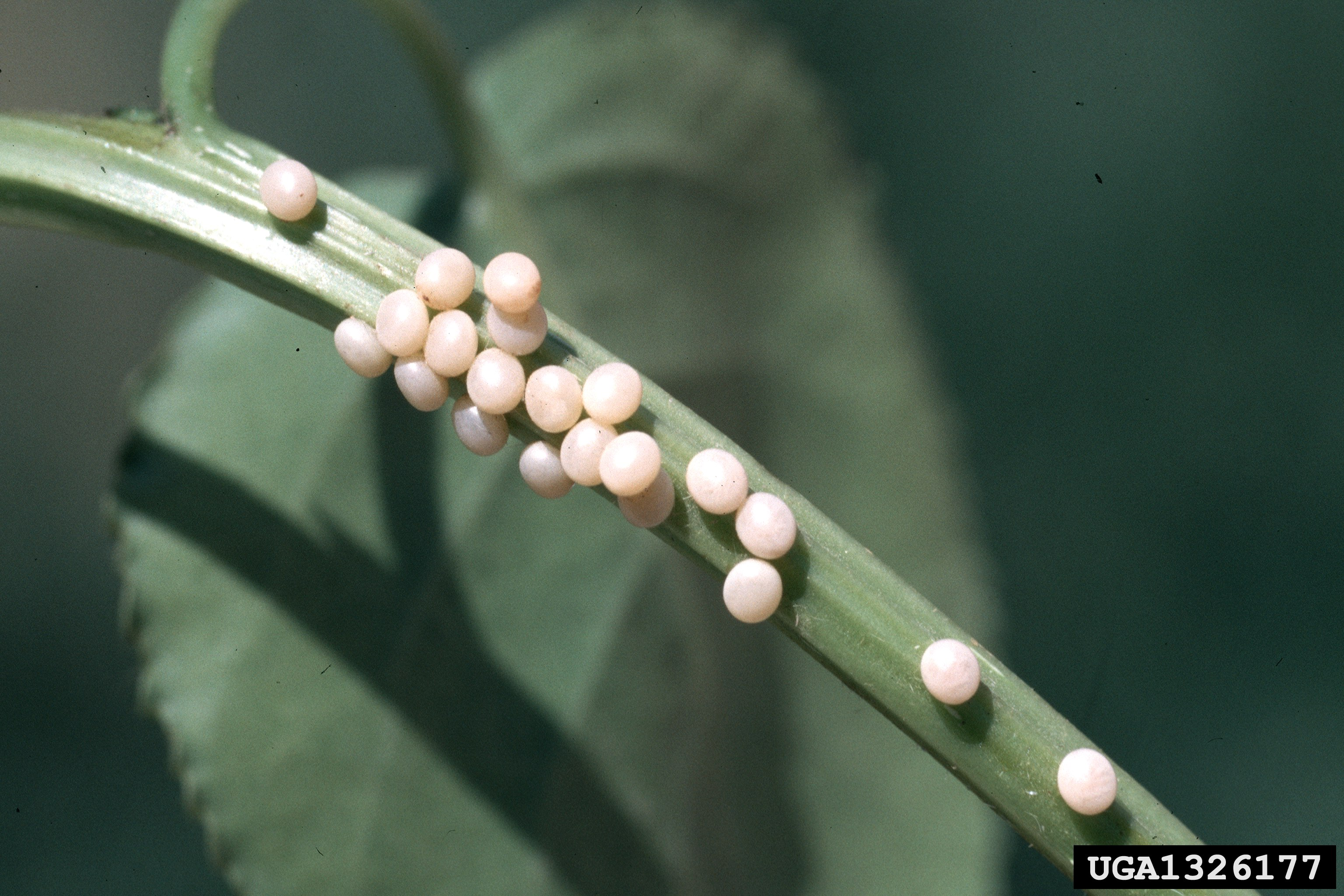
Eggs
