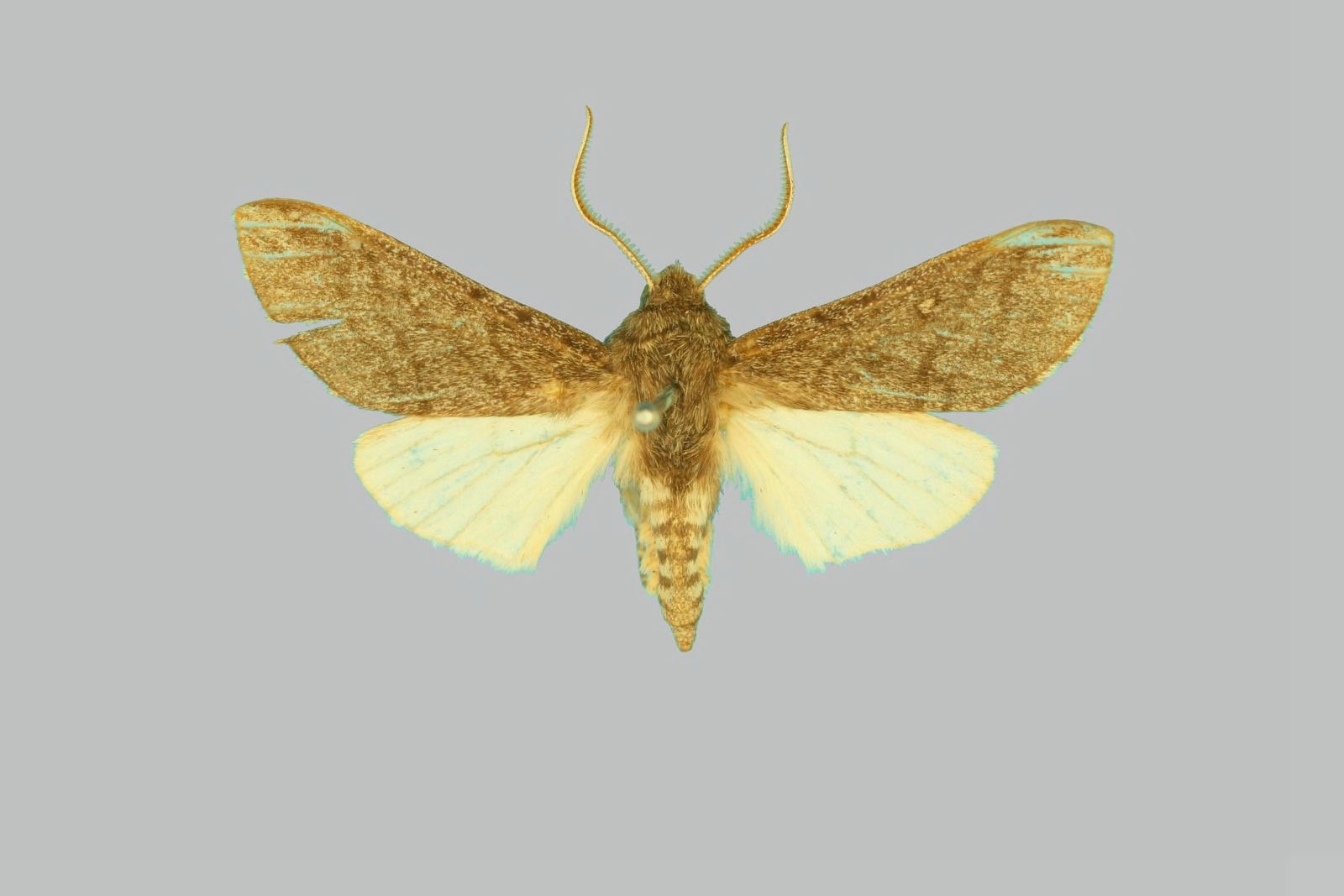

Scientific classification
- Domain: Eukaryota
- Kingdom: Animalia
- Phylum: Arthropoda
- Class: Insecta
- Order: Lepidoptera
- Family: Sphingidae
- Tribe: Sphingulini
- Genus: Hopliocnema; Rothschild & Jordan, 1903
- Species: H. brachycera

Binomial name
- Hopliocnema brachycera (Lower, 1897)

Synonyms
- Cosmotriche brachycera Lower, 1897; Hopliocnema melanoleuca Rothschild & Jordan, 1903

= Hopliocnema =

Genus of moths

Hopliocnema is a genus of moths in the family Sphingidae, containing only one species, Hopliocnema brachycera, which is known from Queensland, Victoria and New South Wales.

The body is dark smoky grey, the head and thorax are unicolorous. There is a series of transverse white spots on the abdomen, and the underside is somewhat paler. The forewing upperside is coloured like the thorax, with two pairs of transverse black lines. The discal spot is greyish white, circled with black. The forewing underside is densely shaded with greyish-white scaling and two vestigial discal lines. The hindwing upperside is dirty white. The hindwing underside is as the upperside, but with some scattered brown scales, which are more numerous in the female.
