= Pachysphinx peninsularis =

Scientific classification
- Domain: Eukaryota
- Kingdom: Animalia
- Phylum: Arthropoda
- Class: Insecta
- Order: Lepidoptera
- Family: Sphingidae
- Genus: Pachysphinx
- Species: P. peninsularis

Binomial name
- Pachysphinx peninsularis Cary, 1963

Species of moth

Pachysphinx peninsularis is a species of moth of the family Sphingidae. It is known from Mexico.
