= Kentrochrysalis heberti =

Scientific classification
- Domain: Eukaryota
- Kingdom: Animalia
- Phylum: Arthropoda
- Class: Insecta
- Order: Lepidoptera
- Family: Sphingidae
- Genus: Kentrochrysalis
- Species: K. heberti

Binomial name
- Kentrochrysalis heberti Haxaire & Melichar, 2010

Species of moth

Kentrochrysalis heberti is a species of moth of the family Sphingidae. It is known from central China.
