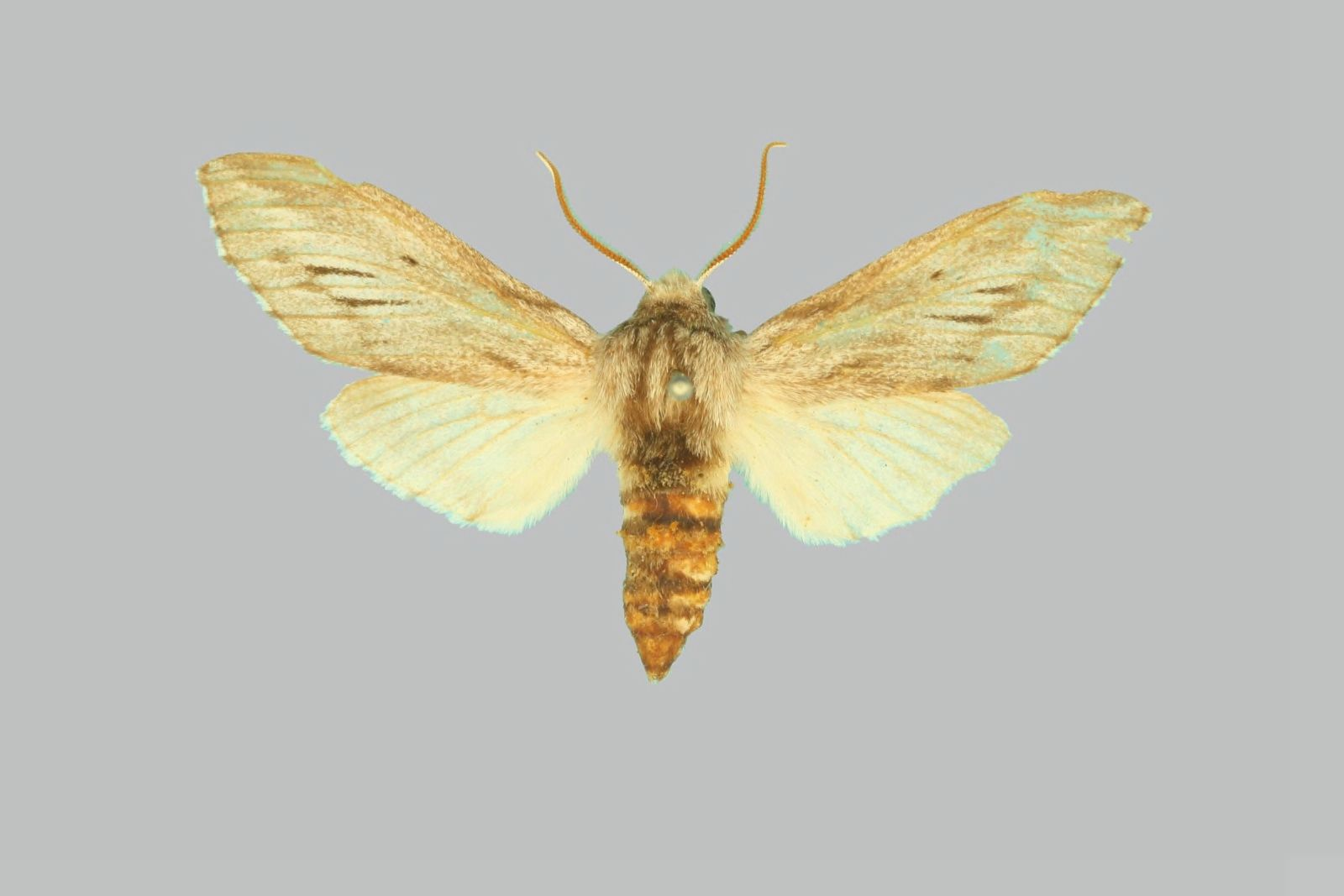
- Synoecha marmorata

Scientific classification
- Kingdom: Animalia
- Phylum: Arthropoda
- Class: Insecta
- Order: Lepidoptera
- Family: Sphingidae
- Tribe: Sphingulini
- Genus: Synoecha; Rothschild & Jordan, 1903
- Species: S. marmorata

Binomial name
- Synoecha marmorata (T. P. Lucas, 1891)

Synonyms
- Sphinx marmorata T. P. Lucas, 1891; Synoecha marmorata dumigani Clark, 1925

= Synoecha =

Genus of moths

Synoecha is a monotypic moth genus in the family Sphingidae erected by Walter Rothschild and Karl Jordan in 1903. Its only species, Synoecha marmorata, described by Thomas Pennington Lucas in 1891, is known from the Australian states of Queensland and New South Wales.

The wingspan is about 40 mm. Adults have fawn forewings and paler hindwings.
