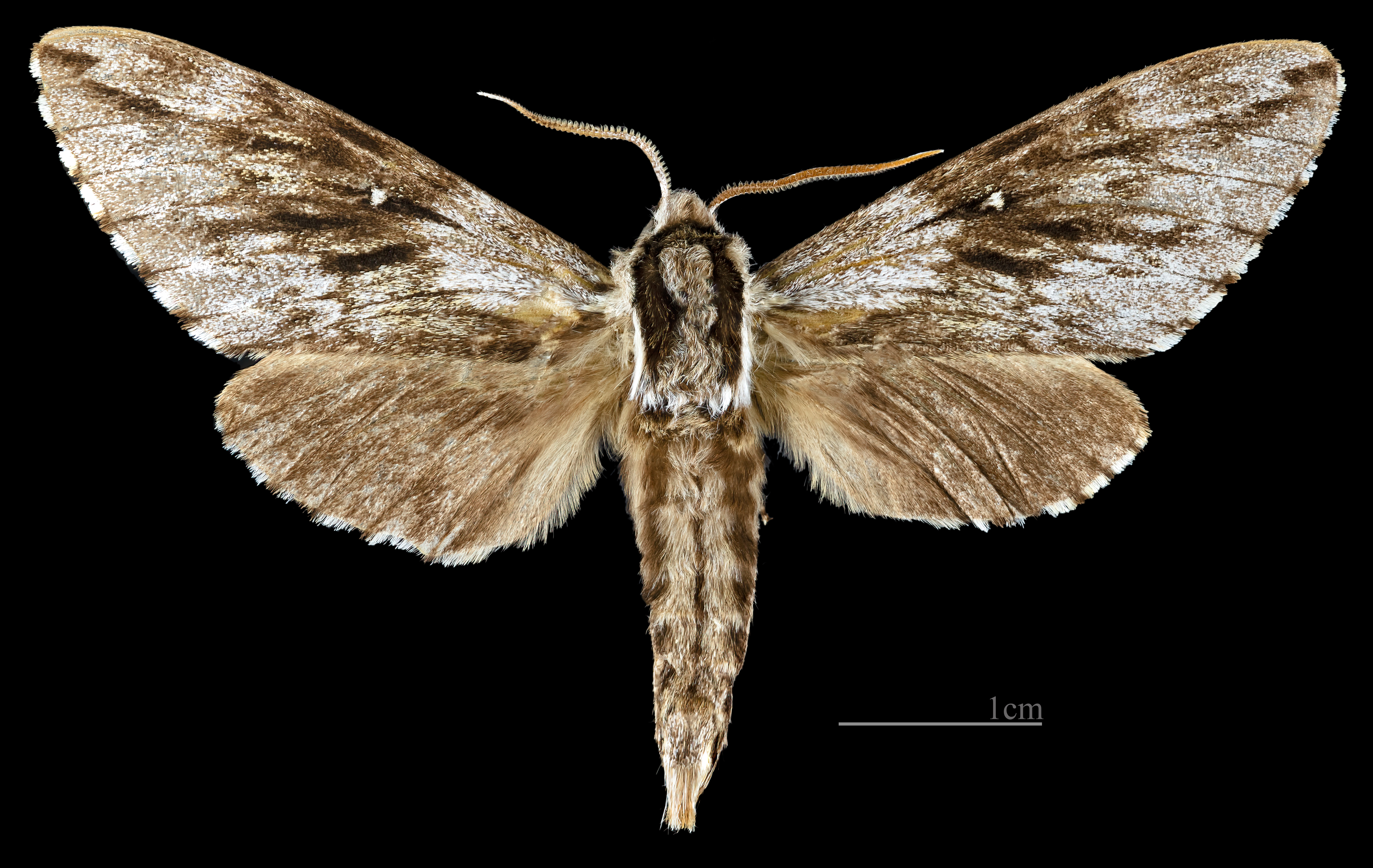
- Kentrochrysalis consimilis ♂
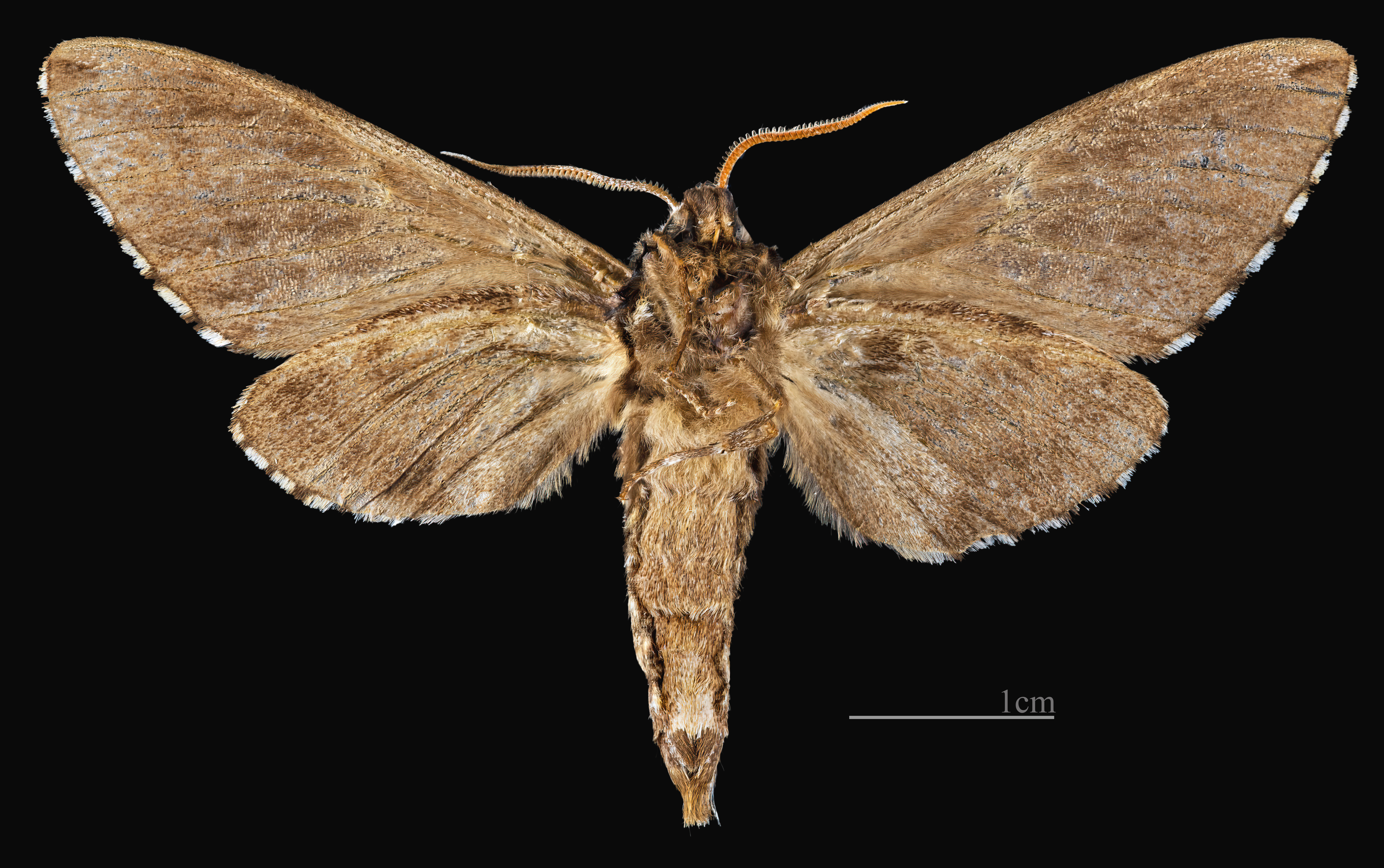
- Kentrochrysalis consimilis ♂ △

Scientific classification
- Domain: Eukaryota
- Kingdom: Animalia
- Phylum: Arthropoda
- Class: Insecta
- Order: Lepidoptera
- Family: Sphingidae
- Genus: Kentrochrysalis
- Species: K. consimilis

Binomial name
- Kentrochrysalis consimilis Rothschild & Jordan, 1903

= Kentrochrysalis consimilis =

Species of moth

Kentrochrysalis consimilis is a species of moth of the family Sphingidae.

== Distribution ==
It is known from the southern part of the Russian Far East, eastern China, North Korea, South Korea and central and southern Japan.

== Description ==
The wingspan is 62–72 mm.

== Biology ==
Adults are on wing from late April to early August in Korea.

The larvae have been recorded feeding on Ligustrum obtusifolium in Korea.
