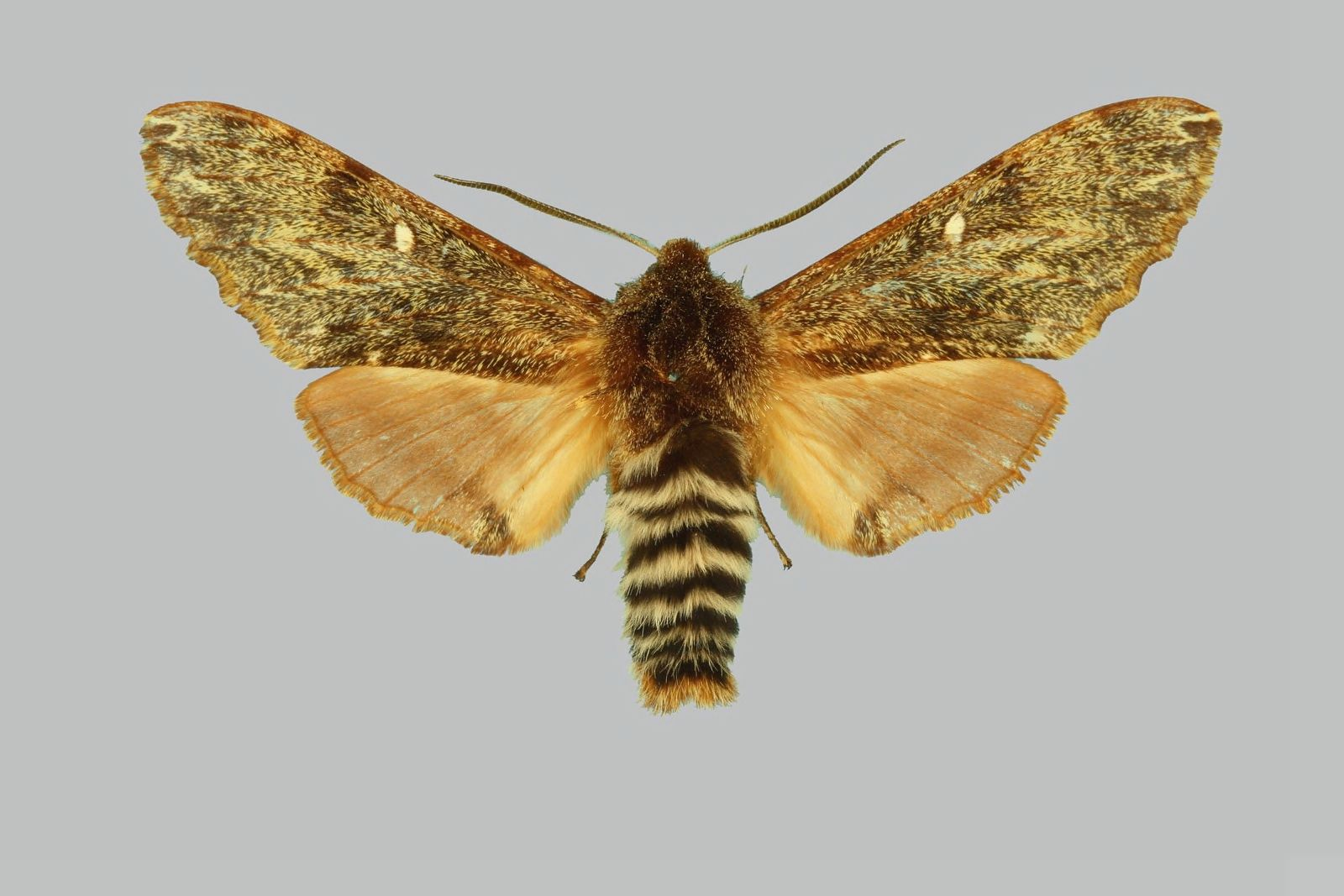
- From Thailand

Scientific classification
- Domain: Eukaryota
- Kingdom: Animalia
- Phylum: Arthropoda
- Class: Insecta
- Order: Lepidoptera
- Family: Sphingidae
- Genus: Pentateucha
- Species: P. curiosa

Binomial name
- Pentateucha curiosa C. Swinhoe, 1908

= Pentateucha curiosa =

Species of moth

Pentateucha curiosa, the hirsute hawkmoth, is a moth of the family Sphingidae. The species was first described by Charles Swinhoe in 1908. It is known from Nepal, north-eastern India, Yunnan in south-western China, northern Thailand and northern Vietnam.

The wingspan is about 104 mm. Adults are on wing in January in Vietnam and from mid-December to mid-February in northern Thailand.

The larvae probably feed on Ilex species (including I. triflora). In captivity, larvae have been reared on leaves of I. aquifolium.
