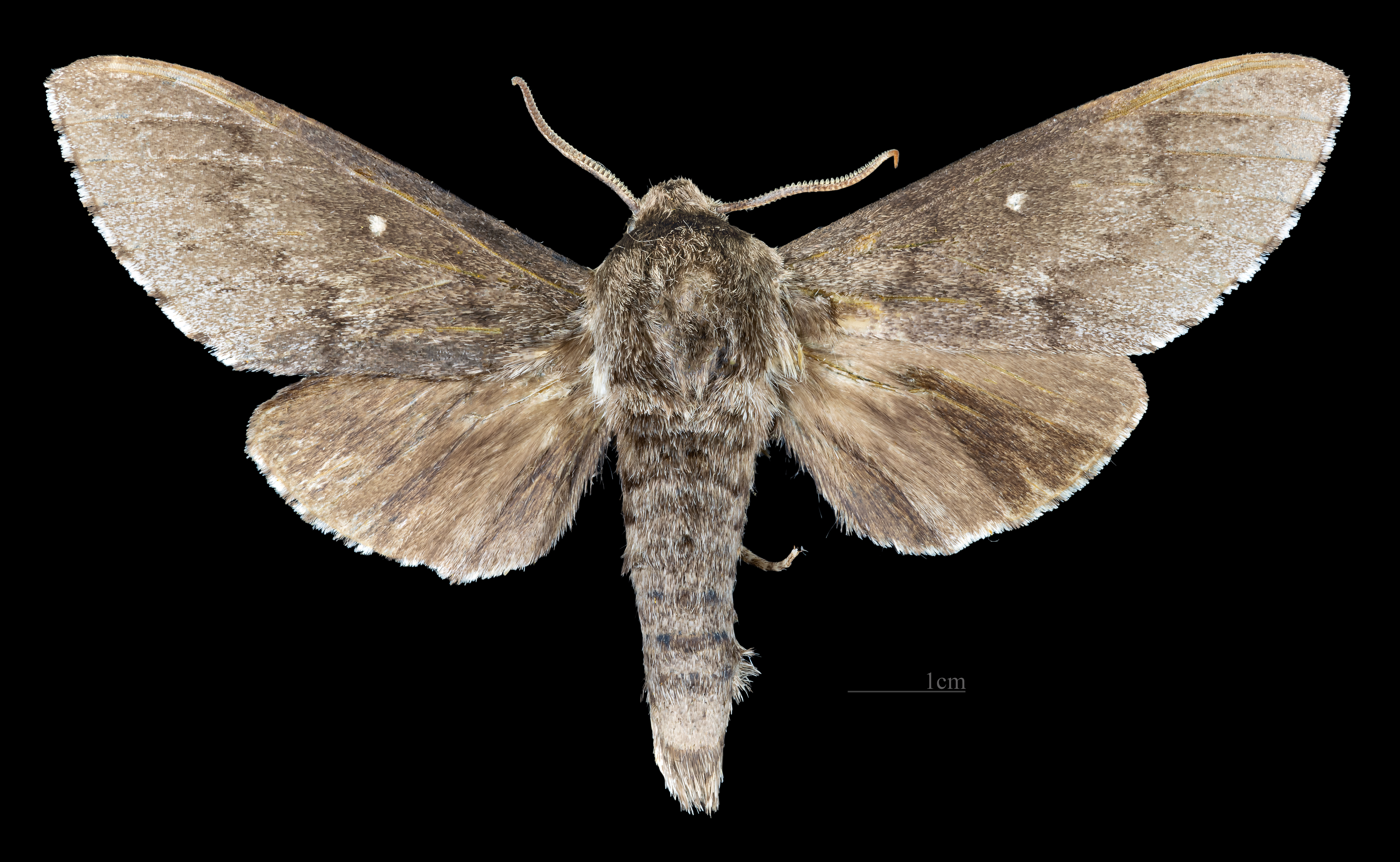
- Male dorsal
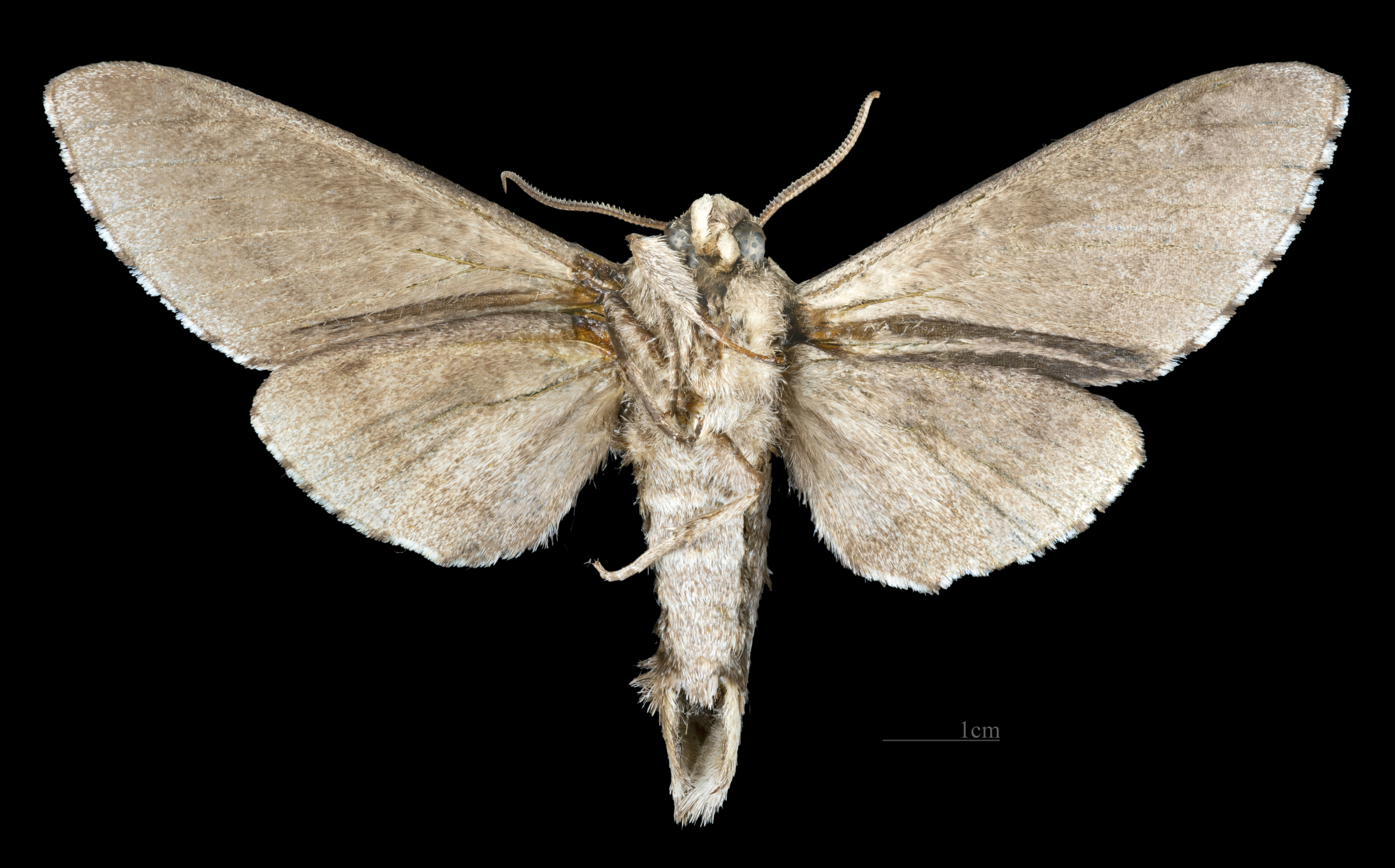
- Male ventral

Scientific classification
- Kingdom: Animalia
- Phylum: Arthropoda
- Class: Insecta
- Order: Lepidoptera
- Family: Sphingidae
- Tribe: Sphingulini
- Genus: Sphingulus; Staudinger, 1877
- Species: S. mus

Binomial name
- Sphingulus mus Staudinger, 1887

Synonyms
- Sphingulus mus taishanis Mell, 1937

= Sphingulus =

Genus of moths

Sphingulus is a genus of moths in the family Sphingidae, containing only one species, Sphingulus mus, the murine hawkmoth.

== Distribution ==
It is found in the south-eastern part of the Russian Far East and the Korean Peninsula south into eastern China.

== Description ==
The wingspan is 57–60 mm.

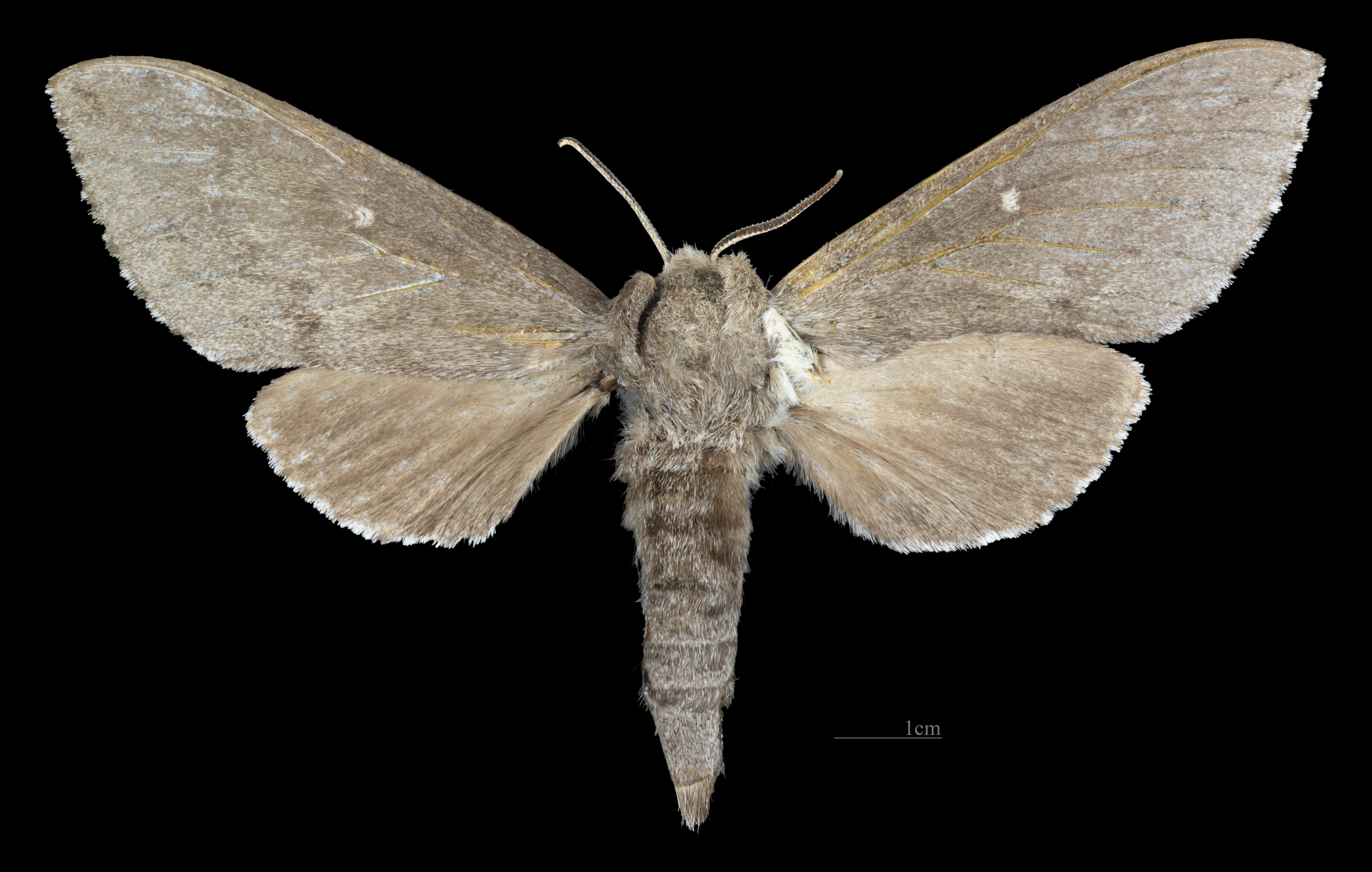
Sphingulus mus ♀

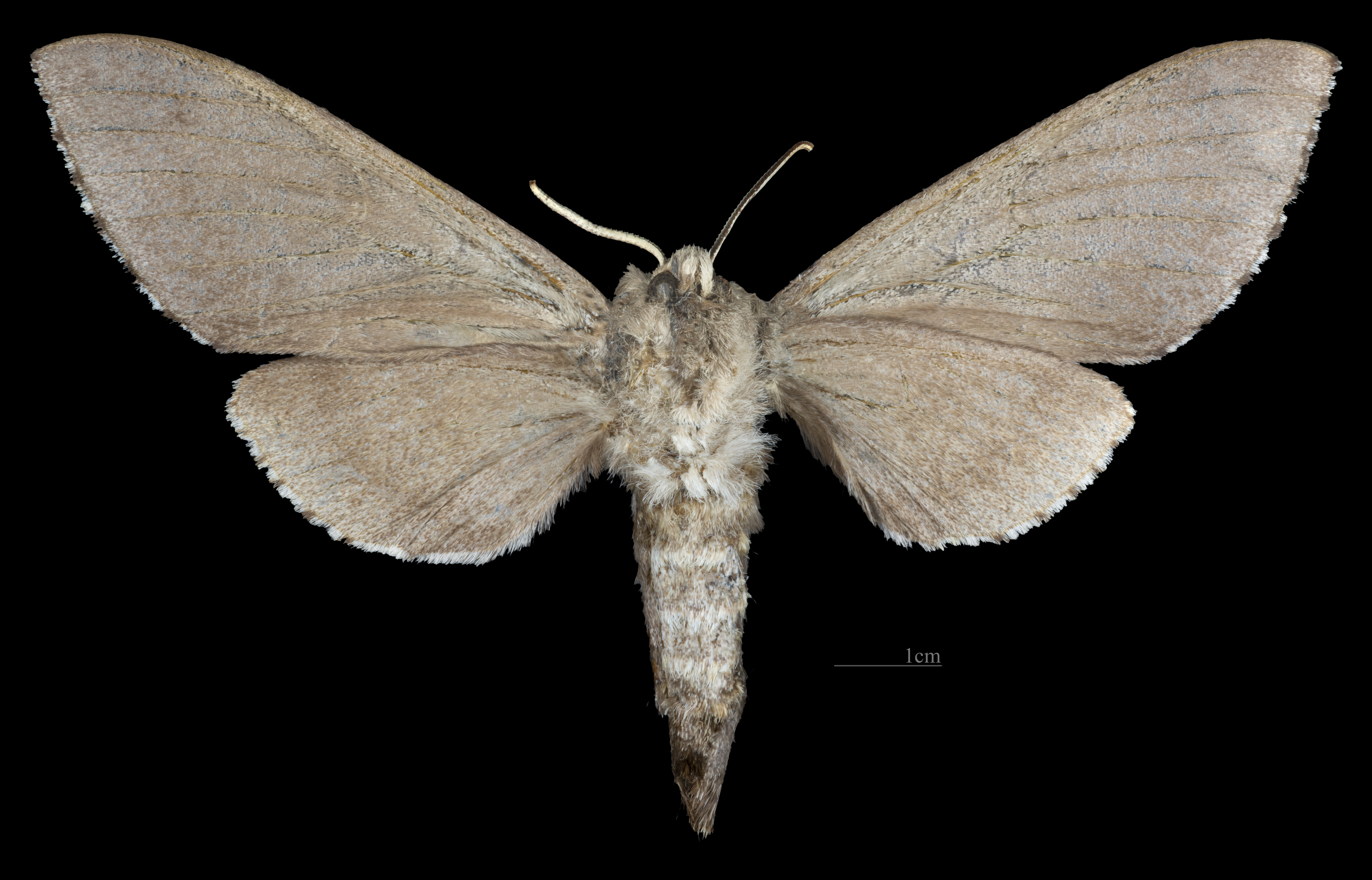
Sphingulus mus ♀ △

== Biology ==
In northern China, there is one generation per year with adults on wing in May and June. In north-eastern China and the Russian Far East, there is probably partial second generation with adults on wing in July and August in some years. In Korea, adults have been recorded from June to July.

Larvae have been reared on Fraxinus species.
