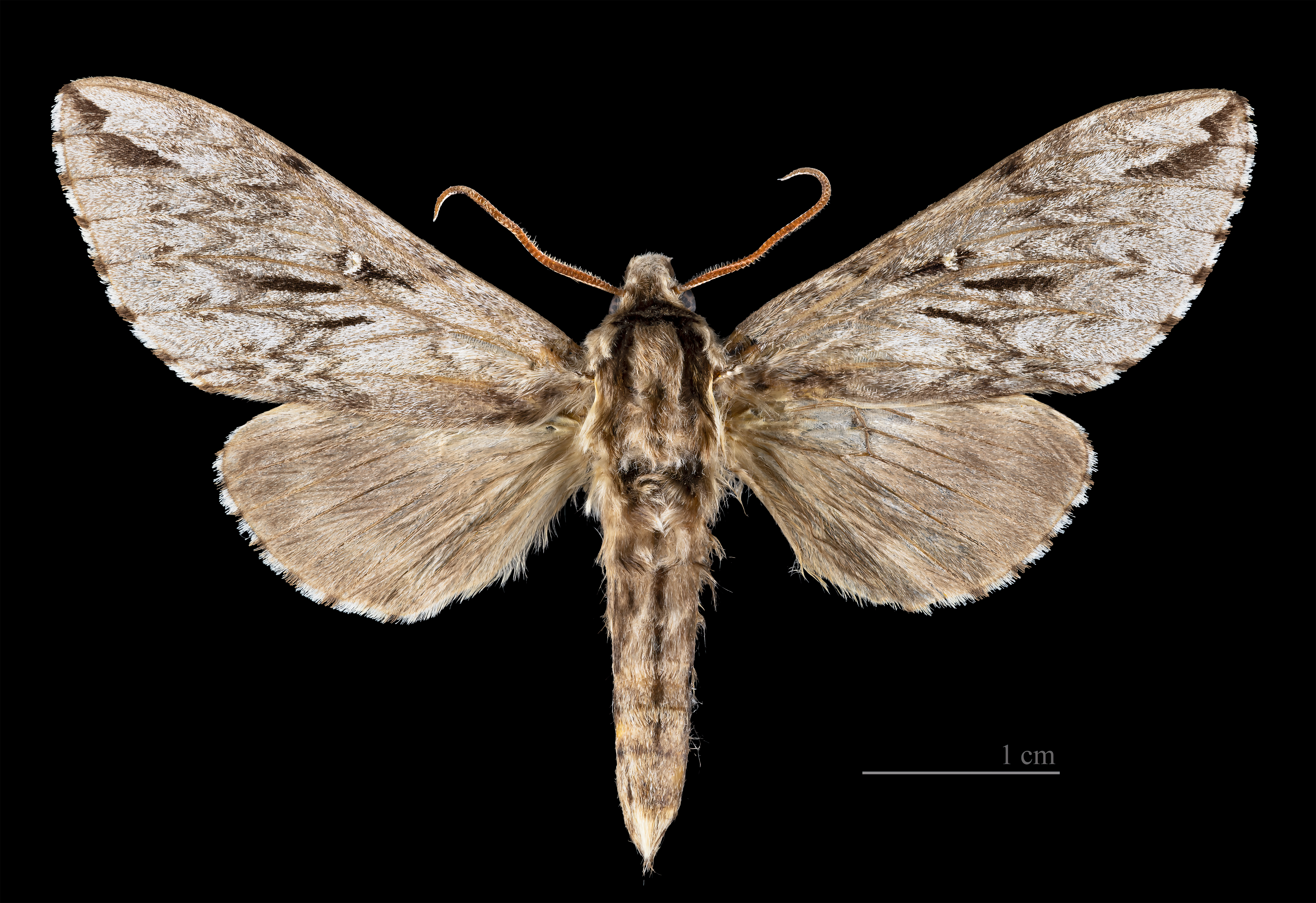
- Kentrochrysalis streckeri dorsal
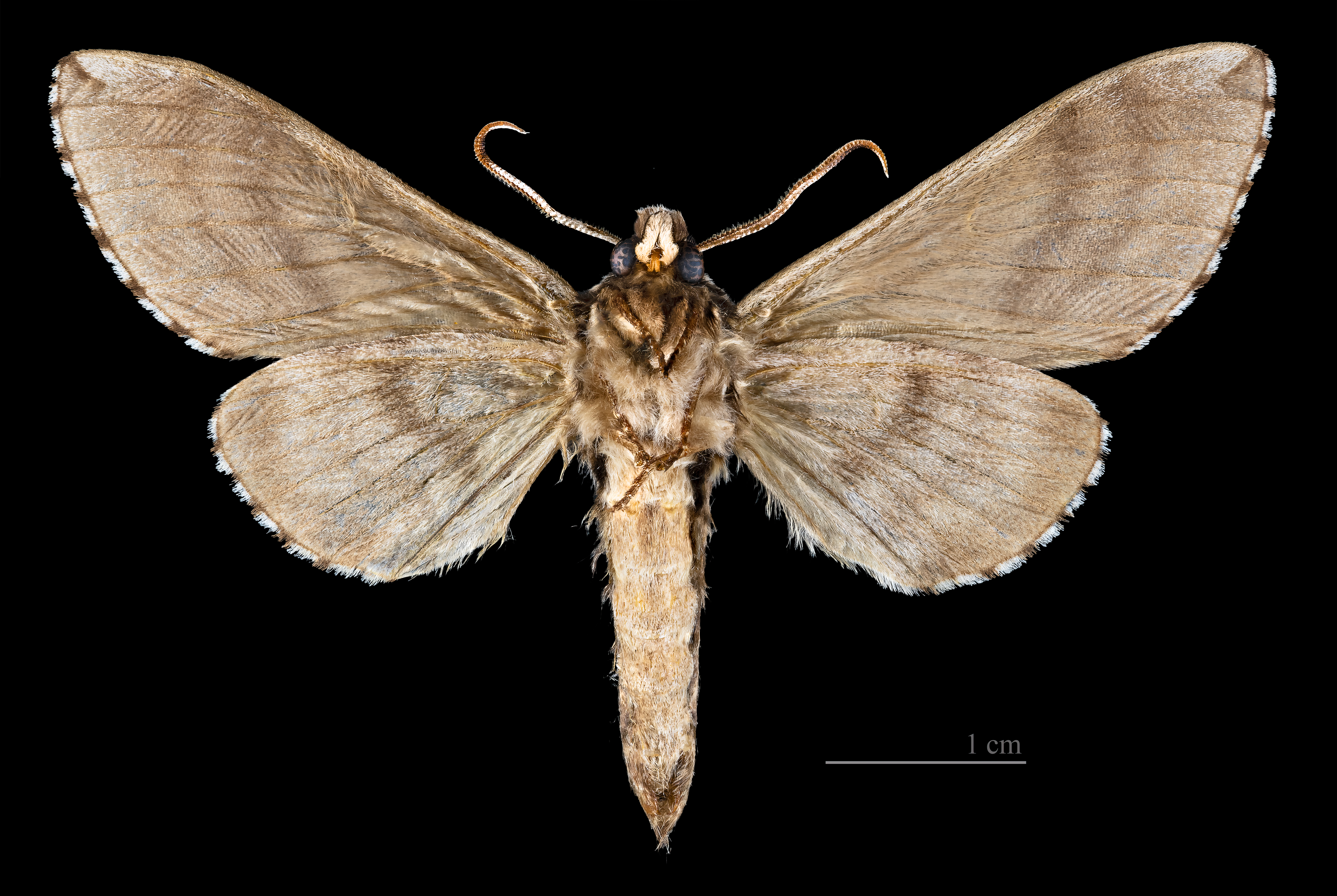
- Kentrochrysalis streckeri ventral

Scientific classification
- Kingdom: Animalia
- Phylum: Arthropoda
- Class: Insecta
- Order: Lepidoptera
- Family: Sphingidae
- Genus: Kentrochrysalis
- Species: K. streckeri

Binomial name
- Kentrochrysalis streckeri (Staudinger, 1880)

Synonyms
- Sphinx streckeri Staudinger, 1880; Sphinx davidis Oberthür, 1880

= Kentrochrysalis streckeri =

Species of moth

Kentrochrysalis streckeri is a species of moth of the family Sphingidae.

== Distribution ==
It is known from Mongolia, the Russian Far East, north-eastern China and North Korea.

== Description ==
The wingspan is 88–90 mm. In Khabarovsk in Russia there is one full generation with adults on wing from May to July, with a partial second generation in August in some years.

== Biology ==
The larvae have been recorded feeding on Fraxinus (including Fraxinus mandshurica), Ligustrum and Syringa species in Primorskiy Kray.
