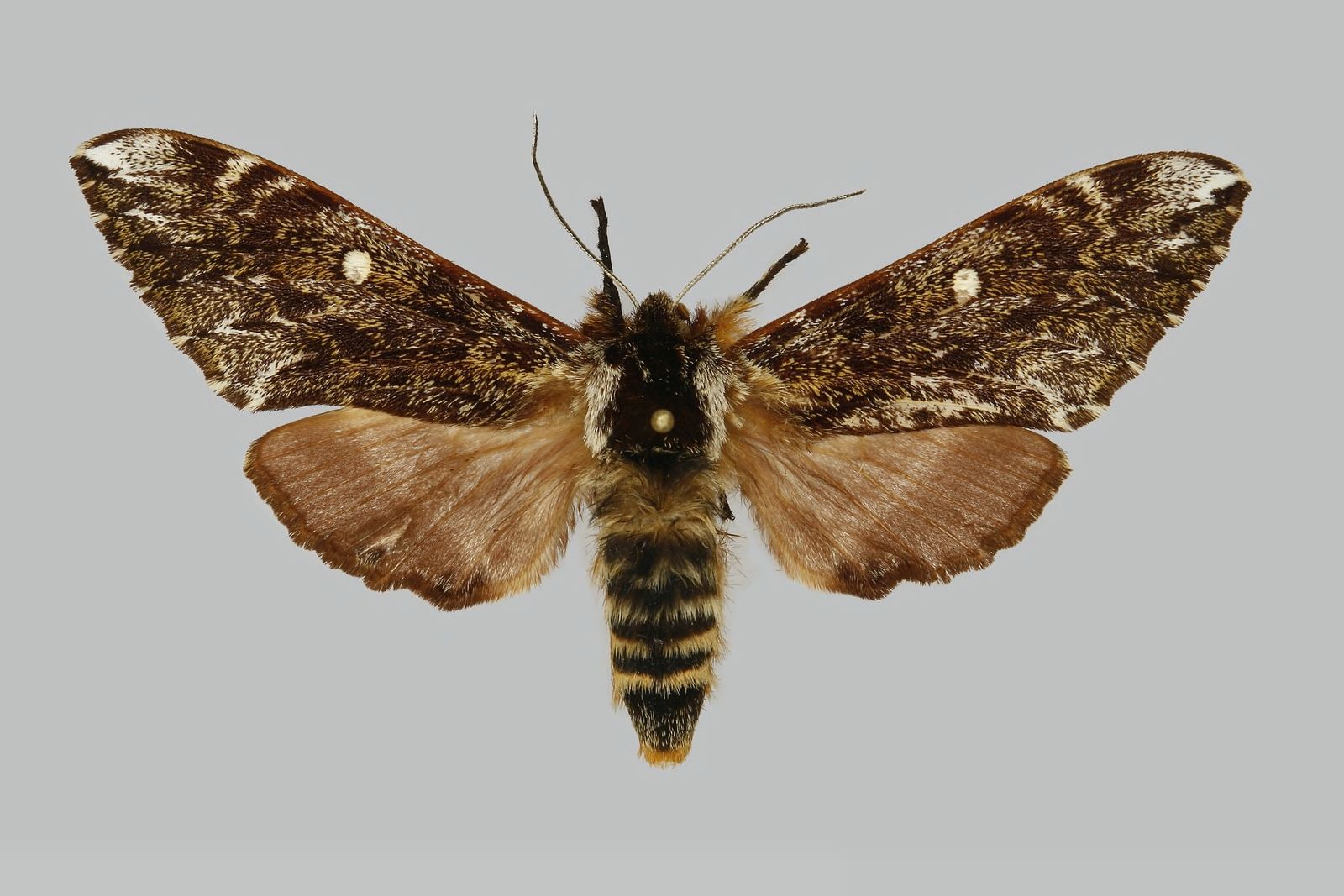

Scientific classification
- Kingdom: Animalia
- Phylum: Arthropoda
- Clade: Pancrustacea
- Class: Insecta
- Order: Lepidoptera
- Family: Sphingidae
- Genus: Pentateucha
- Species: P. stueningi

Binomial name
- Pentateucha stueningi Owada & Kitching, 1997

= Pentateucha stueningi =

Species of moth

Pentateucha stueningi, the Chinese hirsute hawkmoth, is a species of moth of the family Sphingidae. It is known from the isolated warm temperate mountains of Zhejiang and neighbouring Anhui in south-eastern China. The habitat consists of alpine forests.
