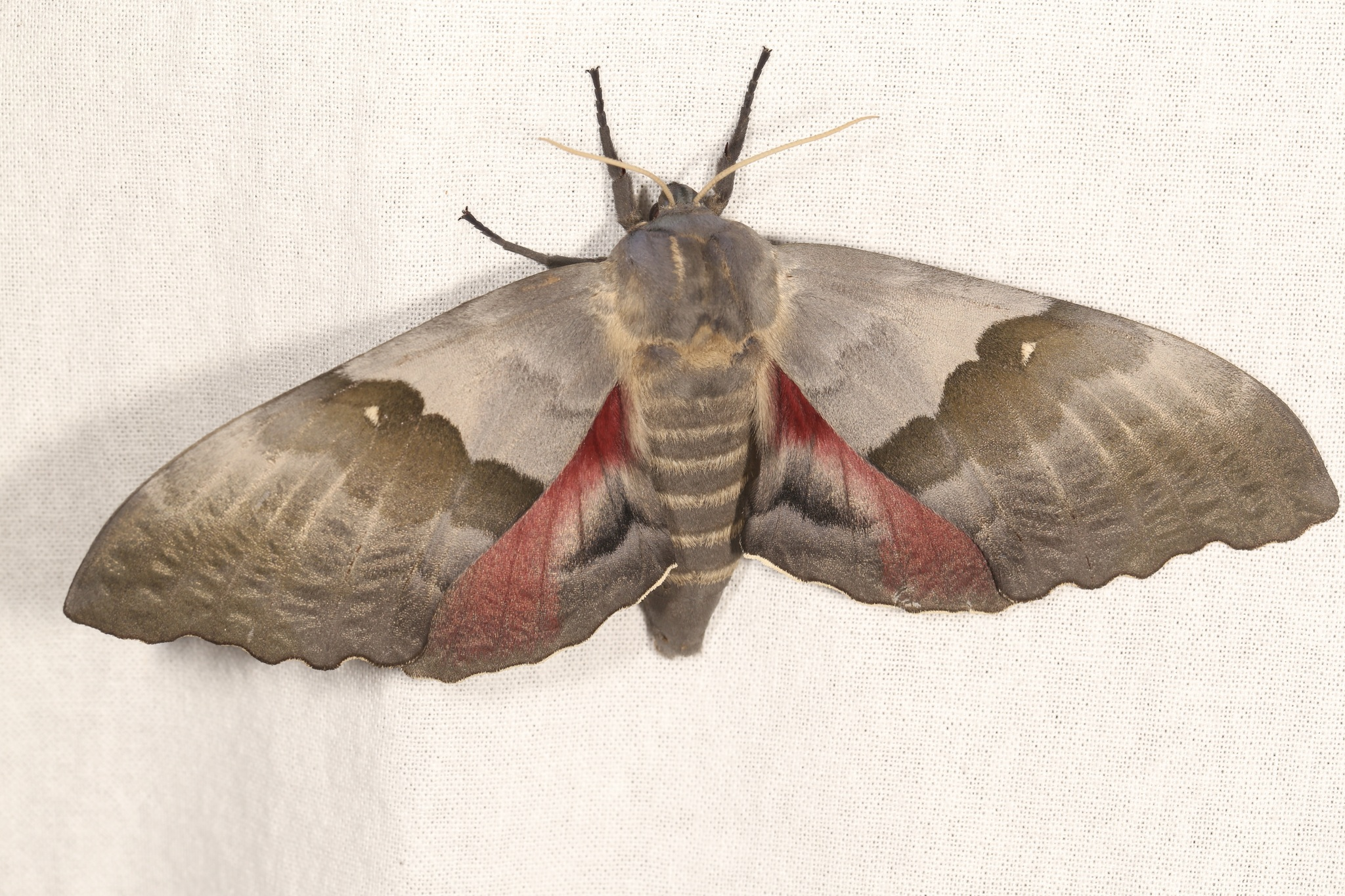

Scientific classification
- Kingdom: Animalia
- Phylum: Arthropoda
- Clade: Pancrustacea
- Class: Insecta
- Order: Lepidoptera
- Family: Sphingidae
- Genus: Pachysphinx
- Species: P. modesta

Binomial name
- Pachysphinx modesta (Harris, 1839)

Synonyms
- Smerinthus modesta Harris, 1839; Smerinthus populicola Boisduval, 1875; Smerinthus princeps Walker, 1856; Smerinthus cablei von Reizenstein, 1881; Pachysphinx modesta borealis Clark, 1929

= Pachysphinx modesta =

Modest sphinx

Species of moth

Pachysphinx modesta, the modest sphinx or poplar sphinx, is a moth of the family Sphingidae. The species was first described by Thaddeus William Harris in 1839.

== Gallery ==
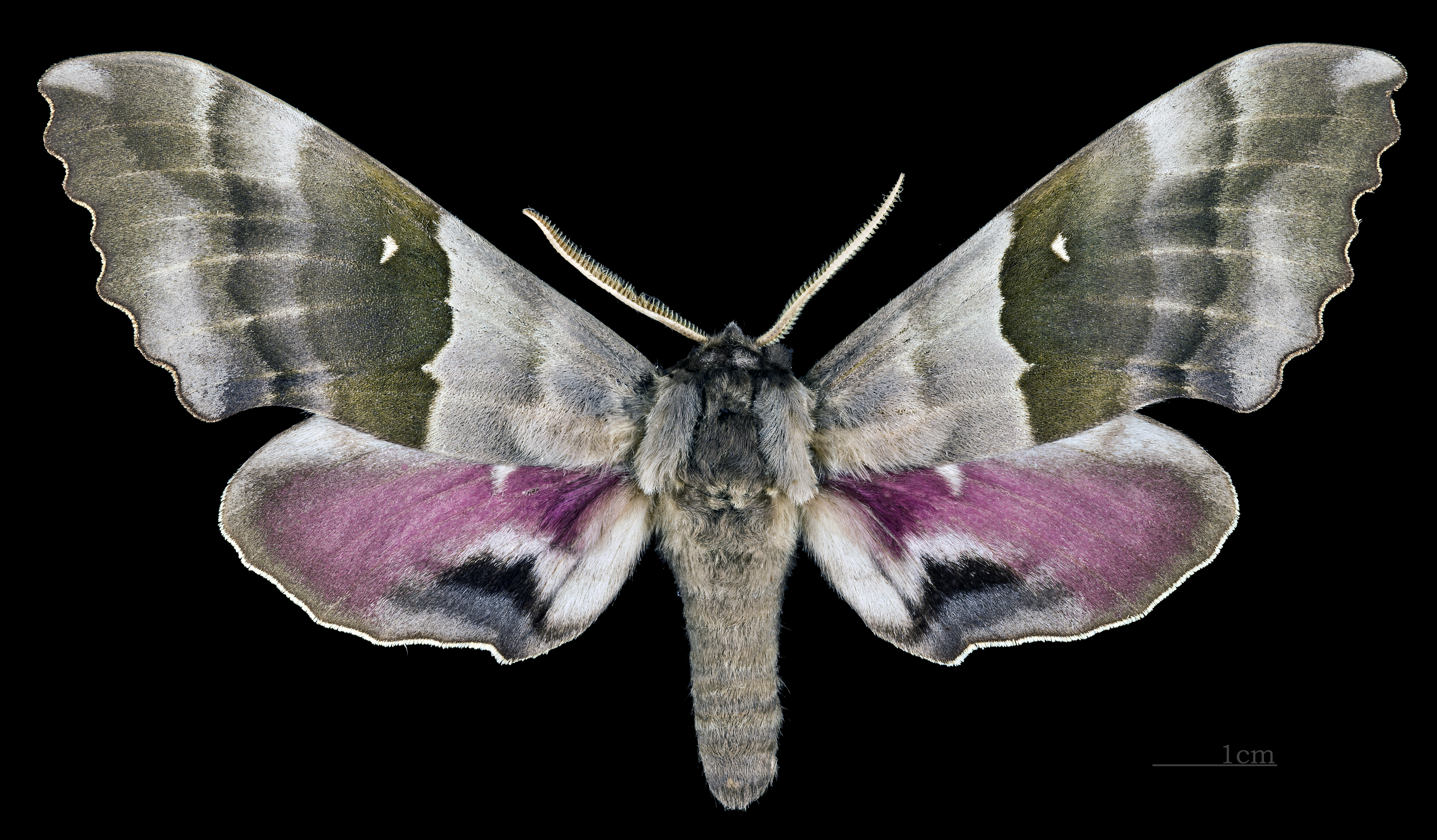
Male, dorsal view

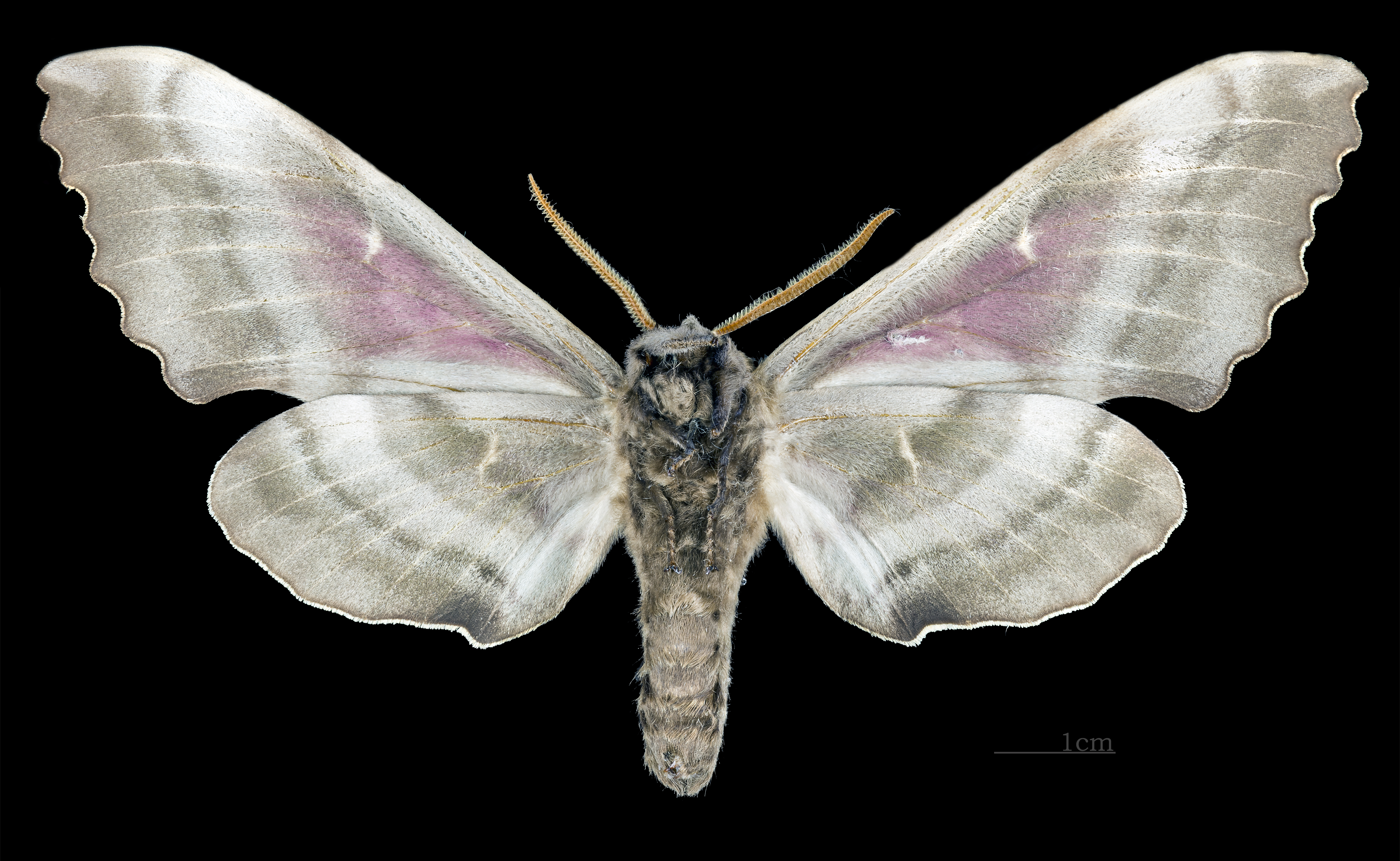
Male, ventral view

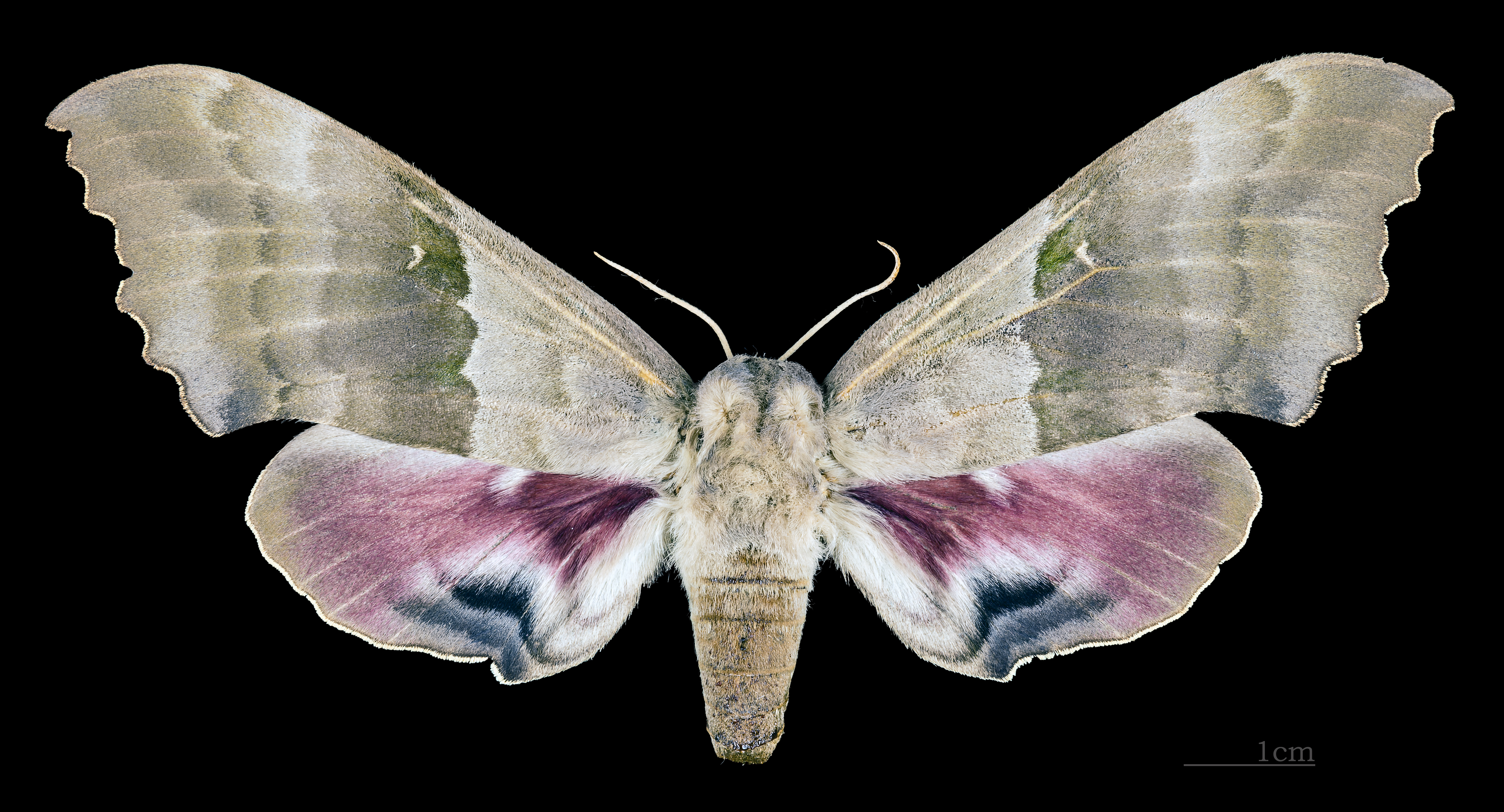
Female, dorsal view

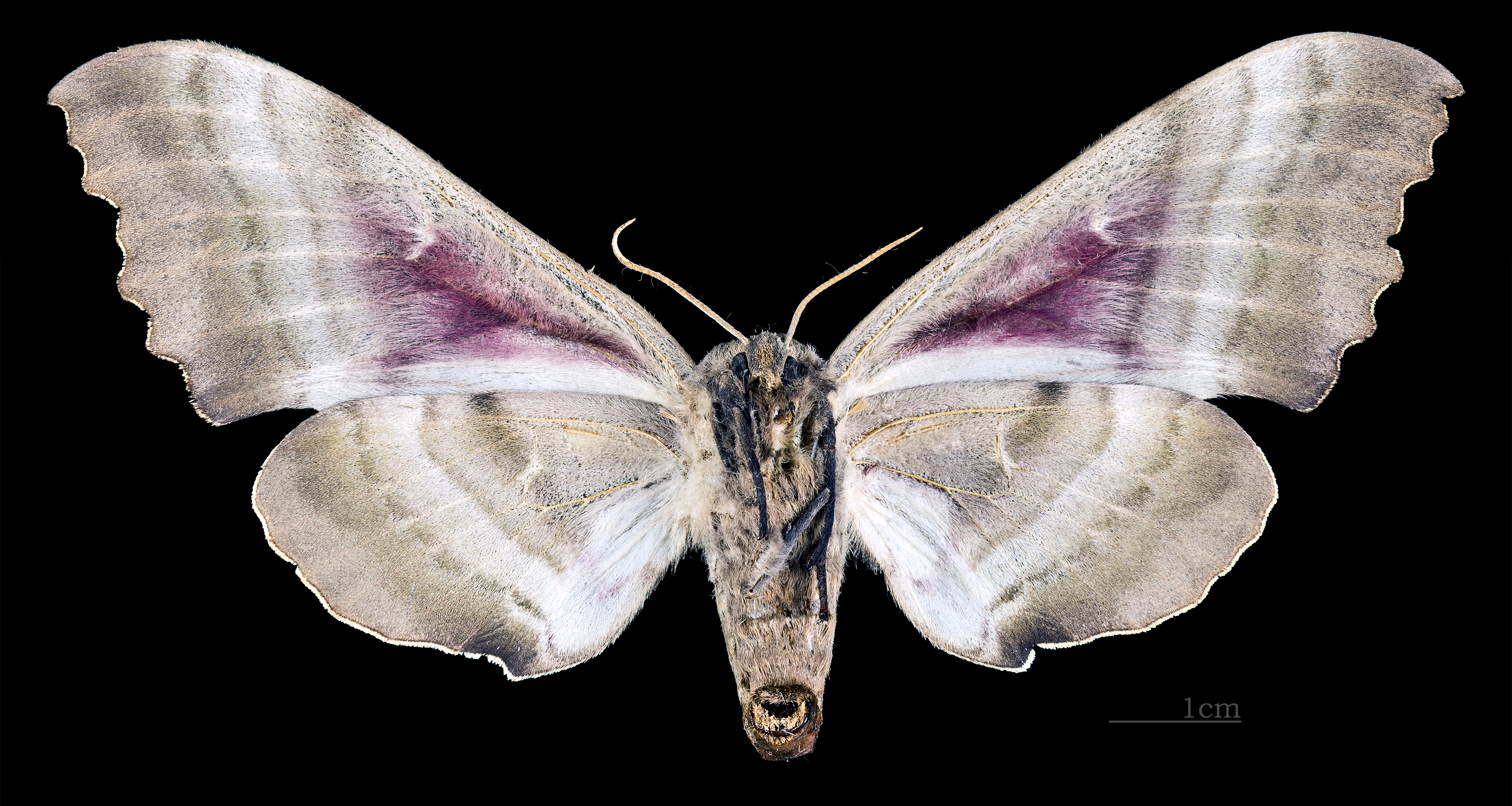
Female, ventral view

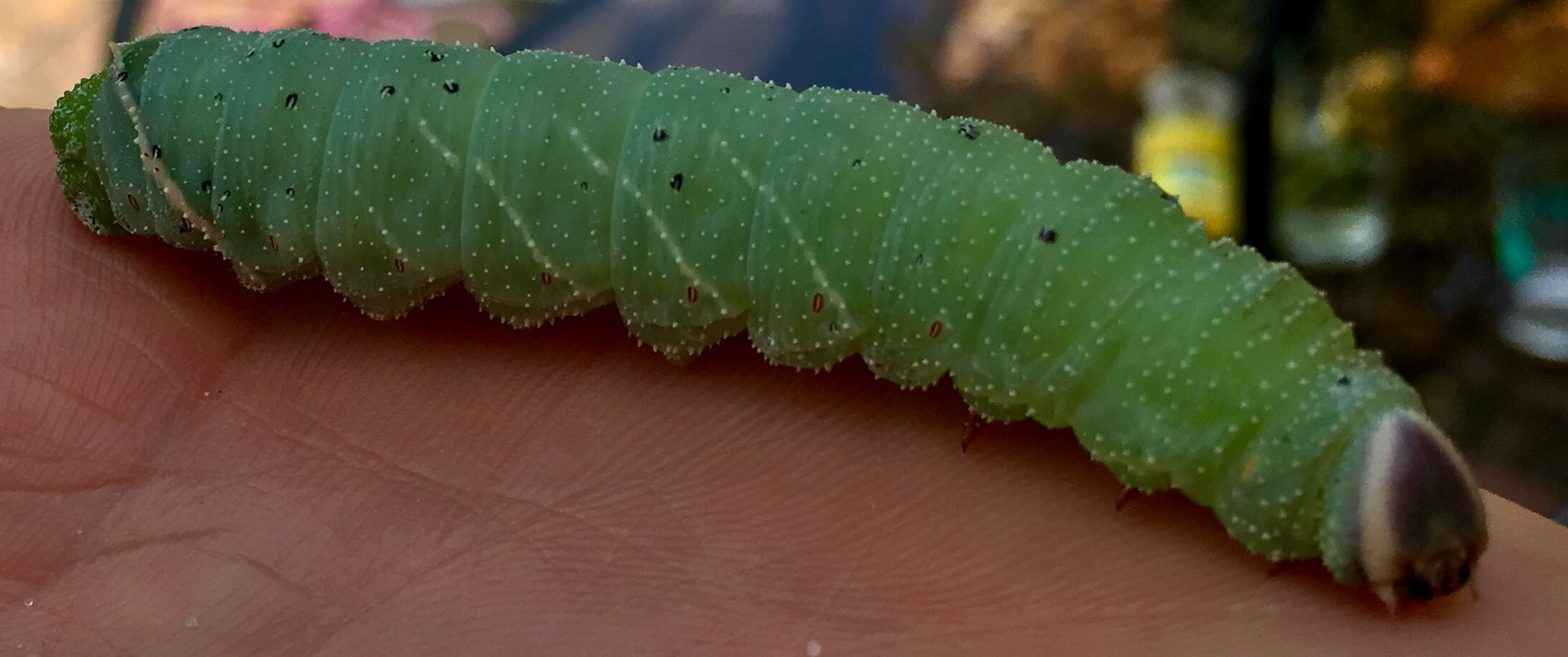
Larva

== Distribution ==
It ranges from the southern United States up and throughout Canada.

== Biology ==
Adults are on the wing from mid-June to mid-July in Canada. In the northern part of the range, there is a single generation, with adults active from May to July. Further south, there may be two generations per year.

The larvae feed on species of poplar, willow, and cottonwood.
