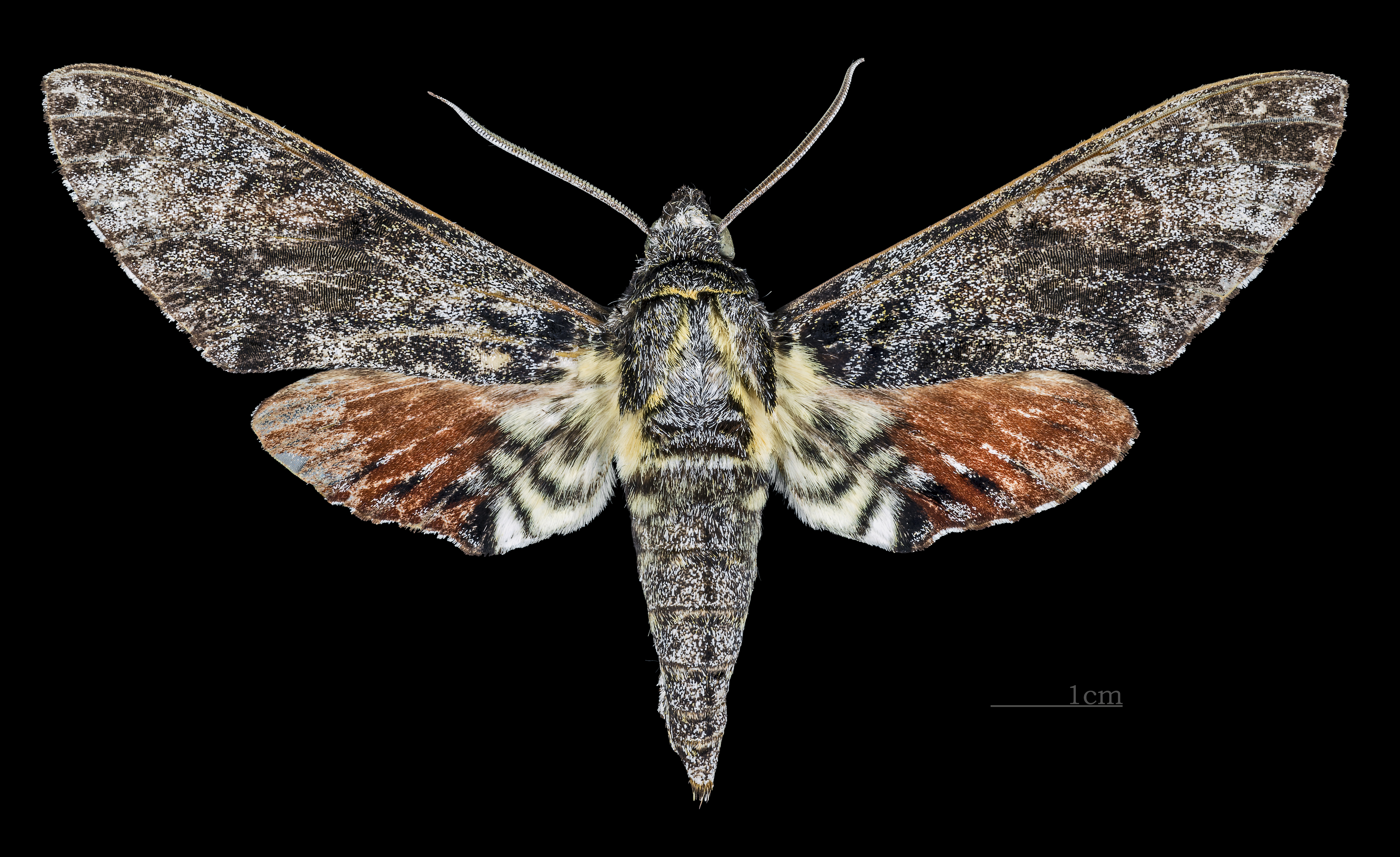
- Tetrachroa edwardsi

Scientific classification
- Domain: Eukaryota
- Kingdom: Animalia
- Phylum: Arthropoda
- Class: Insecta
- Order: Lepidoptera
- Family: Sphingidae
- Subfamily: Smerinthinae
- Tribe: Sphingulini; Rothschild & Jordan, 1903

= Sphingulini =

Tribe of moths

Sphingulini is a tribe of moths of the family Sphingidae. The tribe was described by Walter Rothschild and Karl Jordan in 1903.

== Taxonomy ==
- Genus Coenotes Rothschild & Jordan, 1903
- Genus Dolbina Staudinger, 1877
- Genus Hopliocnema Rothschild & Jordan, 1903
- Genus Kentrochrysalis Staudinger, 1887
- Genus Monarda Druce, 1896
- Genus Pentateucha Swinhoe, 1908
- Genus Sphingulus Staudinger, 1887
- Genus Synoecha Rothschild & Jordan, 1903
- Genus Tetrachroa Rothschild & Jordan, 1903
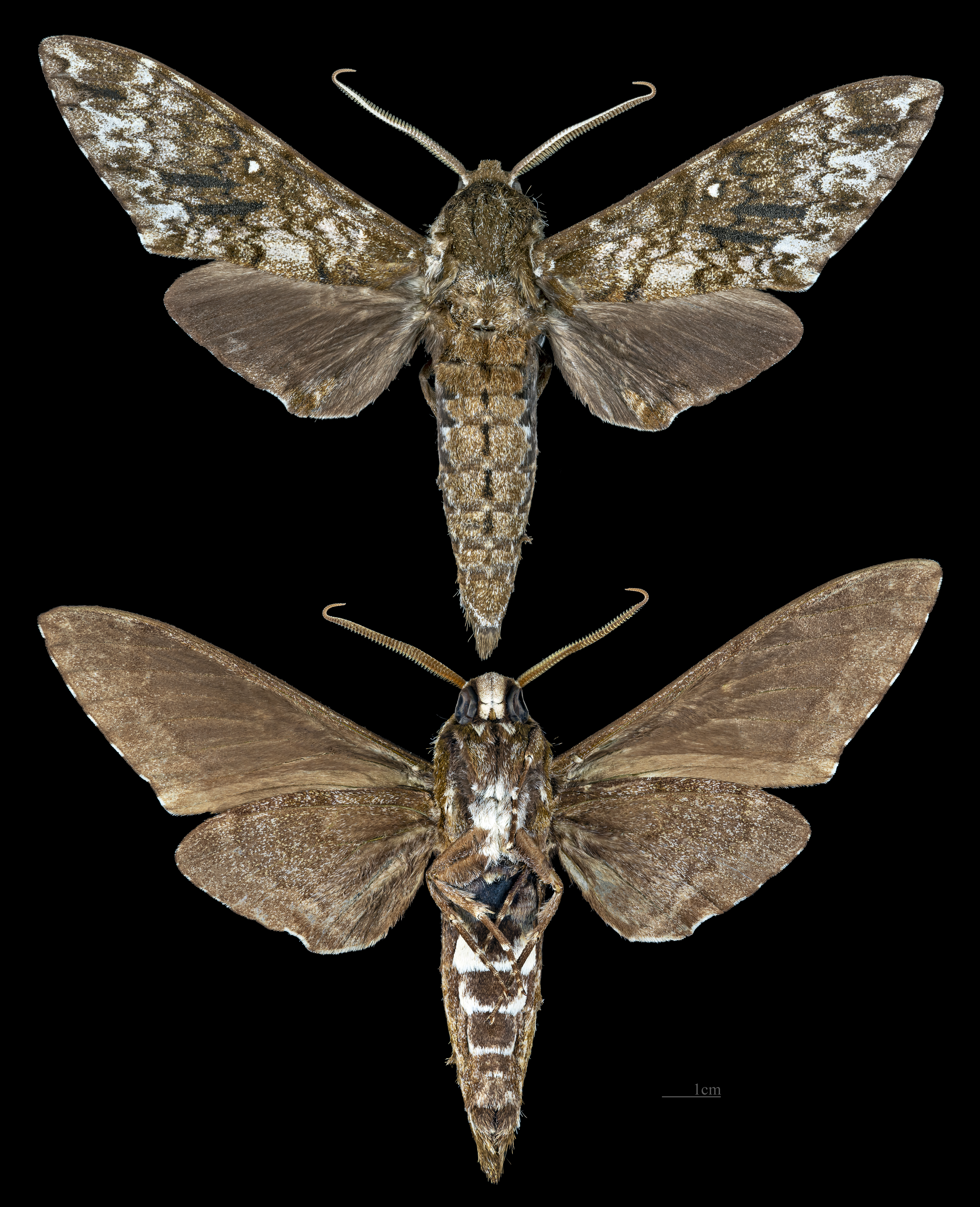
Dolbina

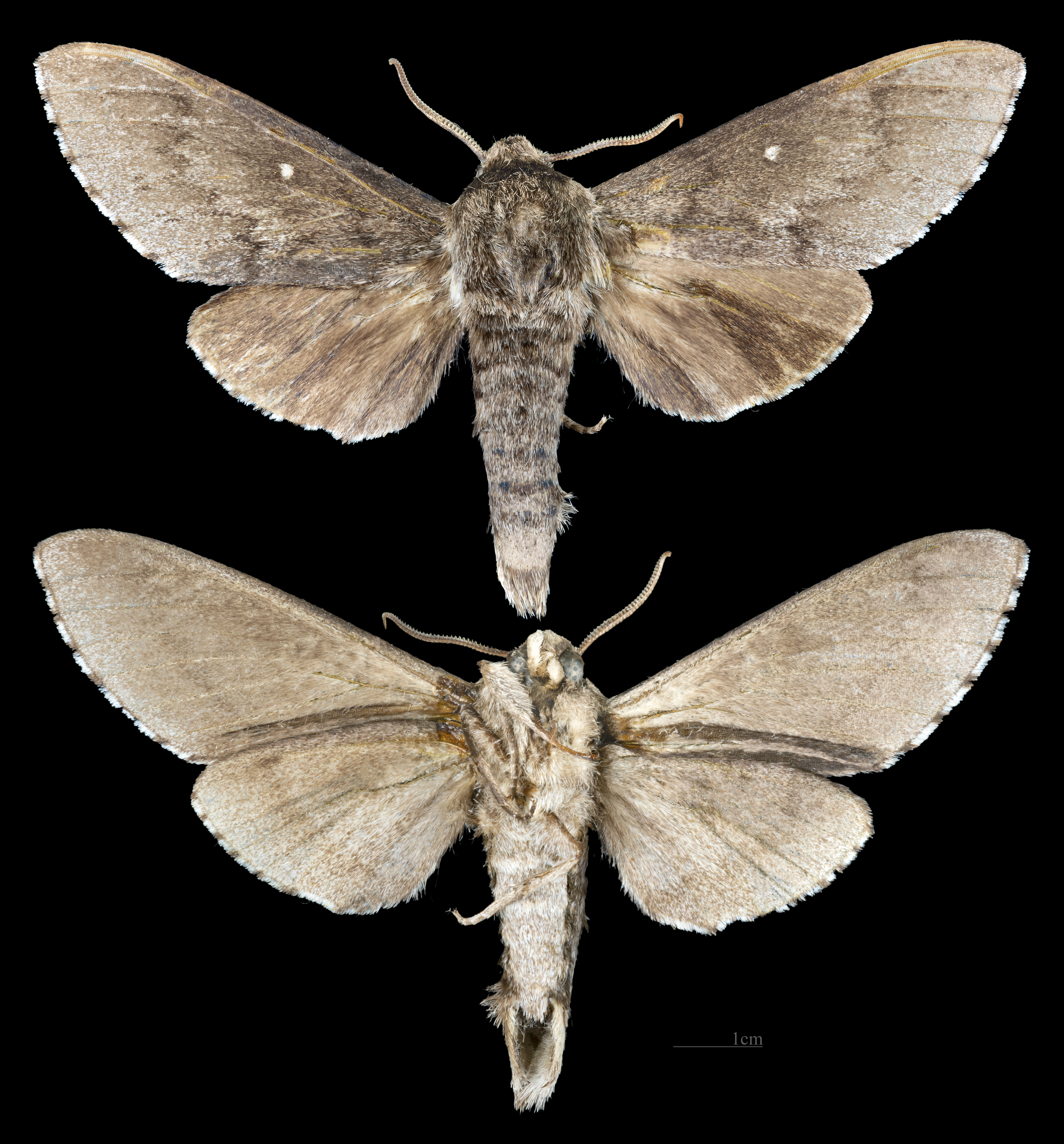
Sphingulus

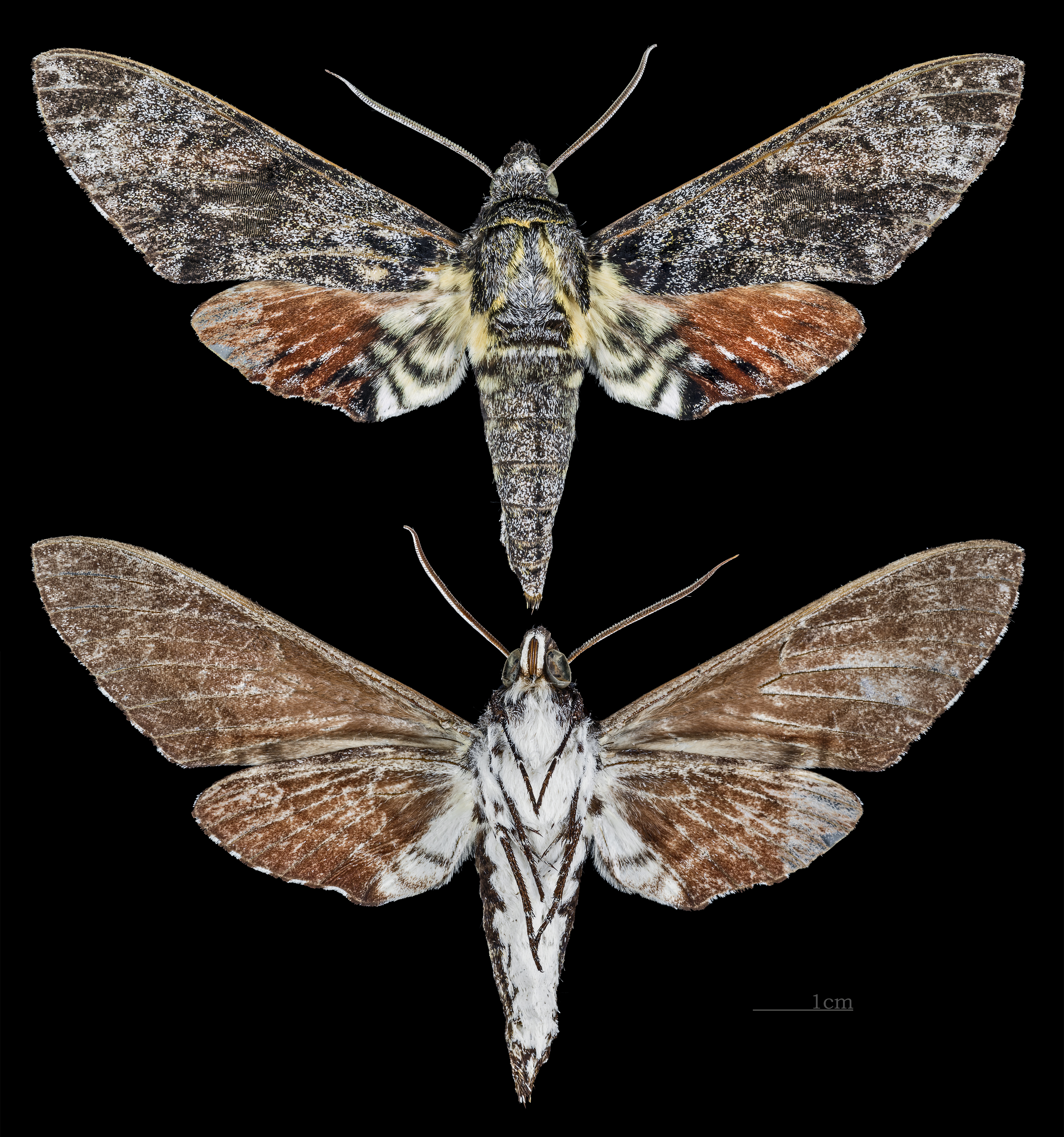
Tetrachroa
