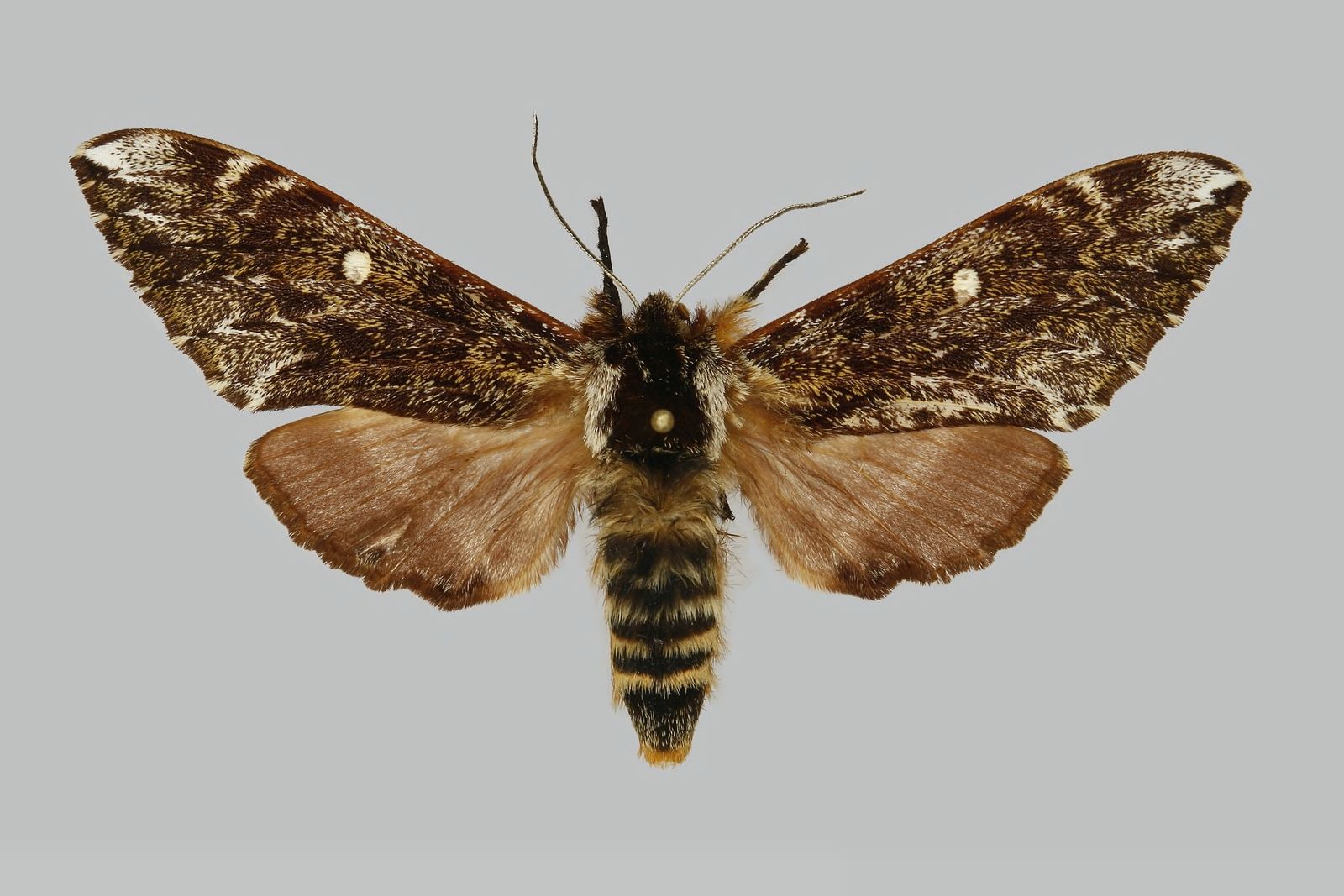
- Pentateucha stueningi

Scientific classification
- Domain: Eukaryota
- Kingdom: Animalia
- Phylum: Arthropoda
- Class: Insecta
- Order: Lepidoptera
- Family: Sphingidae
- Tribe: Sphingulini
- Genus: Pentateucha; C. Swinhoe, 1908

= Pentateucha =

Genus of moths

Pentateucha is a genus of moths in the family Sphingidae. The genus was erected by Charles Swinhoe in 1908.

== Species ==
- Pentateucha curiosa C. Swinhoe, 1908
- Pentateucha inouei Owada & Brechlin, 1997
- Pentateucha stueningi Owada & Kitching, 1997
