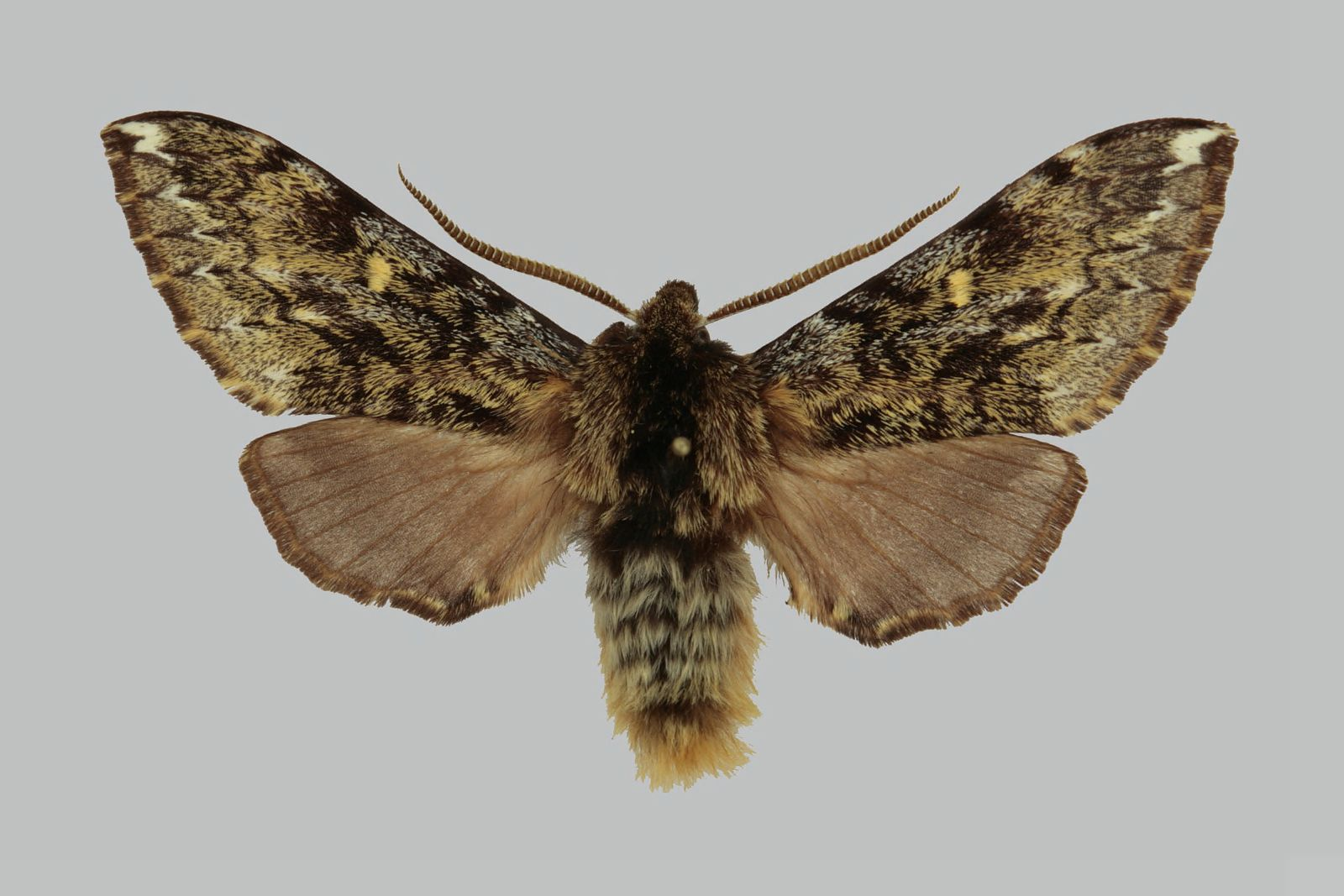

Scientific classification
- Kingdom: Animalia
- Phylum: Arthropoda
- Class: Insecta
- Order: Lepidoptera
- Family: Sphingidae
- Genus: Pentateucha
- Species: P. inouei

Binomial name
- Pentateucha inouei Owada & Brechlin, 1997.

= Pentateucha inouei =

Species of moth

Pentateucha inouei, the Taiwanese hirsute hawkmoth or ormwood moth, is a species of moth of the family Sphingidae. It is endemic to Taiwan. It inhabits alpine forests typically at elevations of 2,000–3,000 m (6,600–9,800 ft) above sea level, sometimes lower.

The larvae have been recorded feeding on Ilex formosana.
