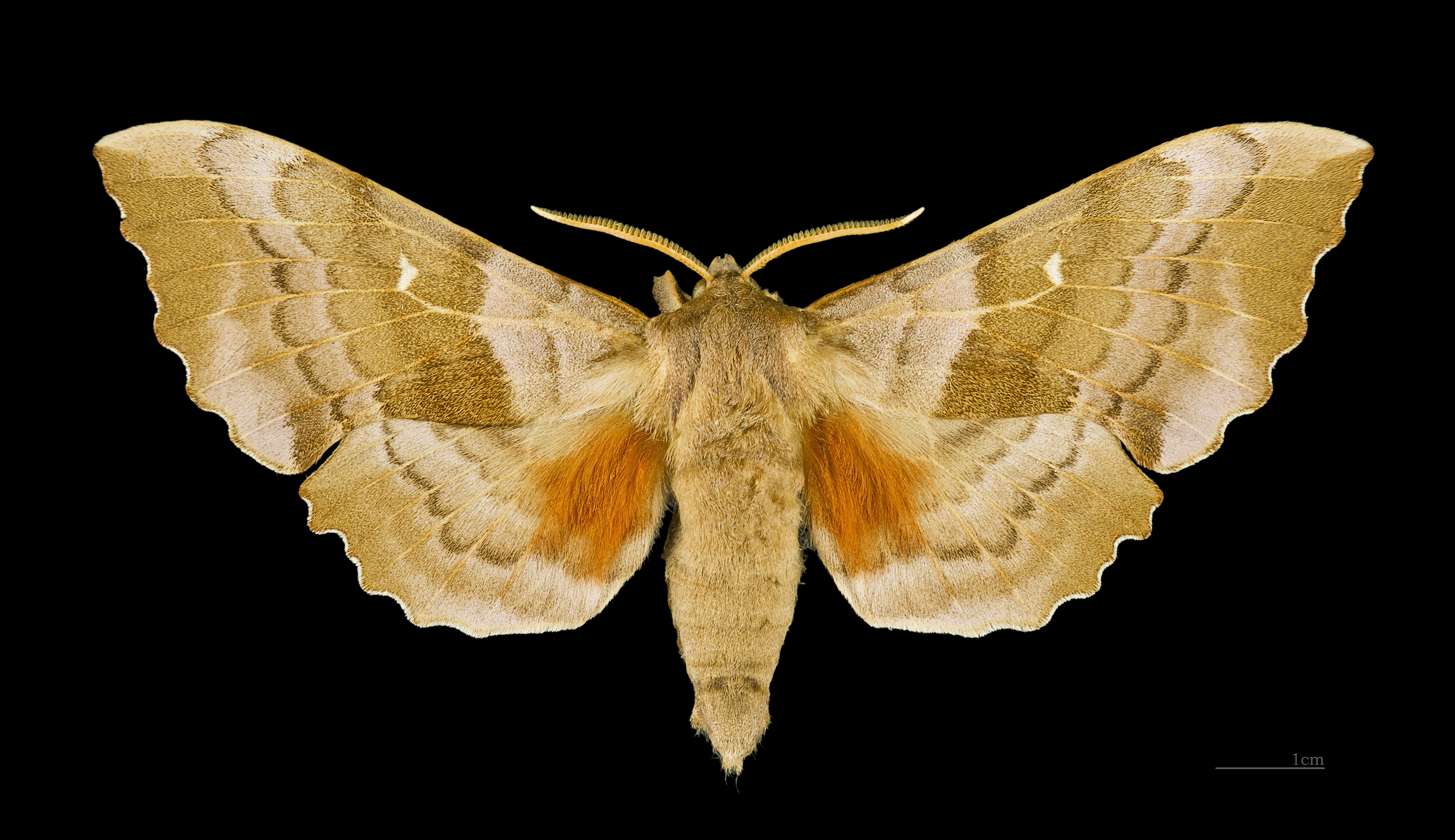
- Laothoe populi, species type

Scientific classification
- Domain: Eukaryota
- Kingdom: Animalia
- Phylum: Arthropoda
- Class: Insecta
- Order: Lepidoptera
- Family: Sphingidae
- Subfamily: Smerinthinae; Grote & Robinson, 1865

Type species
- Laothoe populi Linnaeus, 1758

Diversity
- 77 genera, roughly 329 species

= Smerinthinae =

Subfamily of moths

The Smerinthinae are a subfamily of Sphingidae moths in the order Lepidoptera.

== Smerinthinae taxonomy ==
- Tribe Ambulycini
- Tribe Smerinthini
- Tribe Sphingulini
