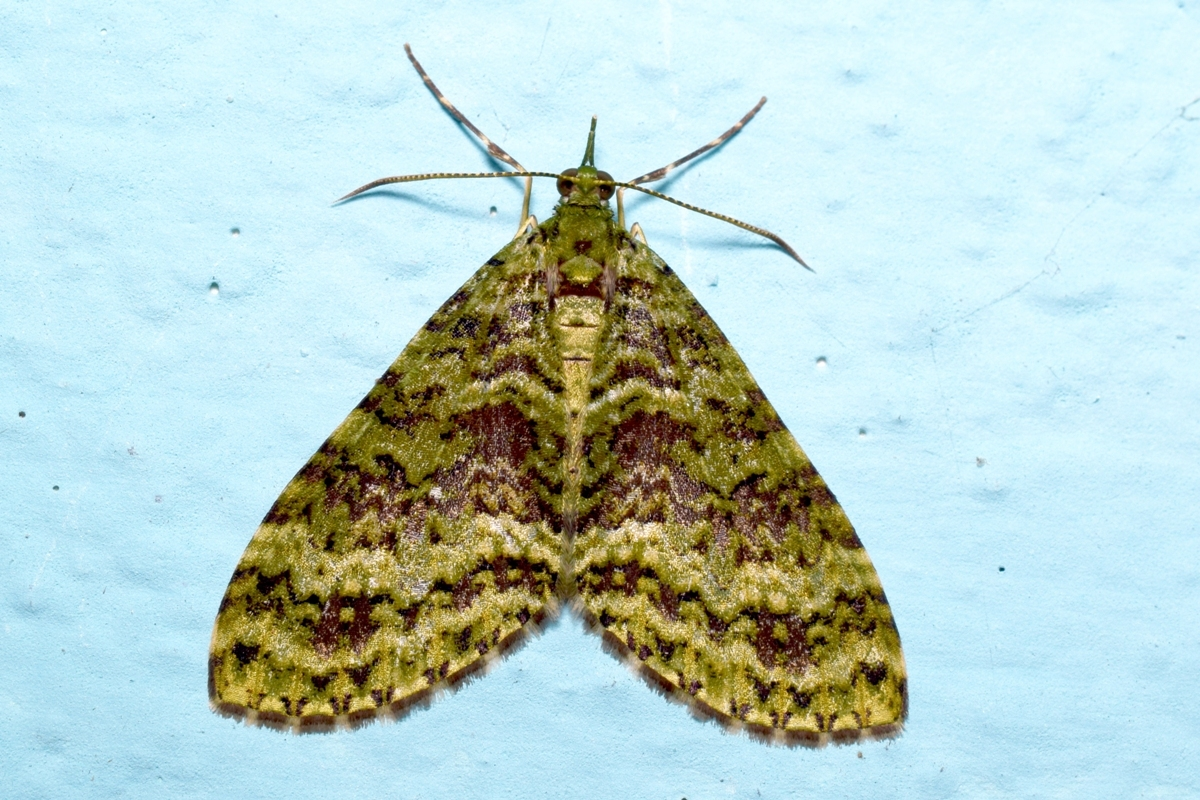
- Sauris bicolor

Scientific classification
- Kingdom: Animalia
- Phylum: Arthropoda
- Class: Insecta
- Order: Lepidoptera
- Family: Geometridae
- Tribe: Trichopterygini
- Genus: Sauris; Guenée, 1857

Synonyms
- List: Acanthodes Prout; Anisocolpia Warren, 1899; Anthierax Warren, 1905; Coptogonia Warren, 1896; Helminthoceras Warren, 1896; Holorista Warren, 1894; Pseudoschista Warren, 1896; Remodes Guenée

= Sauris (moth) =

Genus of moths

Sauris is a genus of moths in the family Geometridae erected by Achille Guenée in 1857.

== Description ==
Palpi porrect (extending forward), usually about three times the length of head, the second joint fringed with hair above. Antennae of male very much thickened and flattened. Hind tibia of male lack spurs, of female with one spur pair. Abdomen very long. Forewings very ample. Vein 3 from before angle of cell. Vein 5 from middle of discocellulars. Vein 6 from upper angle and veins 10 and 11 stalked, whereas vein 10 anastomosing (fusing) with veins 8 and 9 to form the areole. Hindwings of female with vein 2 from near angle of cell. Veins 3 and 4 stalked or from angle. Vein 5 from middle of discocellulars and veins 6 and 7 stalked. Vein 8 anastomosing with vein 7 to near angle of cell.

== Species ==
The following species are recognised in the genus Sauris:

- Sauris abnormis (Moore, 1888)
- Sauris acanthina Prout, 1930
- Sauris angulosa Warren, 1896
- Sauris angusta Warren, 1905
- Sauris angustifasciata (Inoue, 1976)
- Sauris aroensis (Warren, 1903)
- Sauris aspricosta Prout, 1925
- Sauris atrilineata Warren, 1906
- Sauris auricula (Warren, 1895)
- Sauris basilia Prout, 1958
- Sauris bicolor (Warren, 1896)
- Sauris bigriseata Warren, 1907
- Sauris brevipalpis Dugdale, 1980
- Sauris brunnescens (Warren, 1896)
- Sauris cirrhigera (Warren, 1897)
- Sauris coalita Prout, 1931
- Sauris commoni Dugdale, 1980
- Sauris contorta (Warren, 1897)
- Sauris curticornis (Warren, 1897)
- Sauris curvicosta Prout, 1928
- Sauris denigrata Warren, 1897
- Sauris dentatilinea (Warren, 1905)
- Sauris elaica (Meyrick, 1886)
- Sauris erigens Prout, 1925
- Sauris eupitheciata (Snellen, 1881)
- Sauris fuscomarginata Hashimoto, 1995
- Sauris griseolauta Warren, 1906
- Sauris hirudinata Guenée
- Sauris hirundinata Guenée, 1857
- Sauris ignobilis Butler, 1880
- Sauris imbecilla (Swinhoe, 1902)
- Sauris improspera Prout, 1931
- Sauris incissoides Holloway, 1997
- Sauris inscissa Prout, 1958
- Sauris interruptata (Moore, 1888)
- Sauris lichenias (Meyrick, 1891)
- Sauris lineosa (Moore, 1888)
- Sauris lucens (Warren, 1899)
- Sauris malaca (Meyrick, 1891)
- Sauris marginepunctata (Warren, 1899)
- Sauris melanoceros (Meyrick, 1889)
- Sauris melanosterna Dugdale, 1980
- Sauris mellita Prout, 1928
- Sauris mesilauensis Holloway, 1976
- Sauris muscosa Rothschild, 1915
- Sauris nanaria Leech, 1897
- Sauris nebulosa Dugdale, 1980
- Sauris nigricincta Warren, 1896
- Sauris nigrifusalis (Warren, 1896)
- Sauris nigripalpata Walker, 1862
- Sauris oetakwana Prout, 1958
- Sauris othnia Prout, 1958
- Sauris pallidipalpis (Prout, 1916)
- Sauris pallidiplaga (Warren, 1897)
- Sauris parviplaga (Warren, 1906)
- Sauris pelagitis Prout, 1933
- Sauris perfasciata Hampson, 1895
- Sauris plumipes Dugdale, 1980
- Sauris preptochaetes Prout, 1929
- Sauris priva Prout, 1930
- Sauris proboscidaria Walker, 1862
- Sauris pupurotincta Galsworthy, 1999
- Sauris quassa Prout, 1932
- Sauris rectilineata Dugdale, 1980
- Sauris rhododactyla Warren, 1906
- Sauris rubriplaga Warren, 1899
- Sauris seminigra (Warren, 1903)
- Sauris septa Prout, 1929
- Sauris sinuaticornis (Warren, 1896)
- Sauris subfulva (Warren, 1905)
- Sauris trifasciaria Leech
- Sauris triseriata (Moore)
- Sauris tulagiensis Tautel, 2020
- Sauris turpipennis (Warren, 1896)
- Sauris ursula Robinson, 1975
- Sauris usta (Warren, 1895)
- Sauris vetustata Walker, 1866
- Sauris victoria Robinson, 1975
- Sauris victoriae Galsworthy, 1999
- Sauris volcanica (Butler, 1887)
- Sauris wanda Robinson, 1975
- Sauris xissa Robinson, 1975
- BOLD:AAD1012 (Sauris sp.)
- BOLD:AAD1013 (Sauris sp.)
- BOLD:AAF2383 (Sauris sp.)
- BOLD:AAI0741 (Sauris sp.)
- BOLD:AAV7233 (Sauris sp.)
- BOLD:ABX5428 (Sauris sp.)
- BOLD:ACM3914 (Sauris sp.)
