= Trichopteryx veritata =

Scientific classification
- Kingdom: Animalia
- Phylum: Arthropoda
- Clade: Pancrustacea
- Class: Insecta
- Order: Lepidoptera
- Family: Geometridae
- Tribe: Trichopterygini
- Genus: Trichopteryx
- Species: T. veritata

Binomial name
- Trichopteryx veritata Pearsall, 1907

Species of moth

Trichopteryx veritata is a species of geometrid moth in the family Geometridae. It is found in North America.
