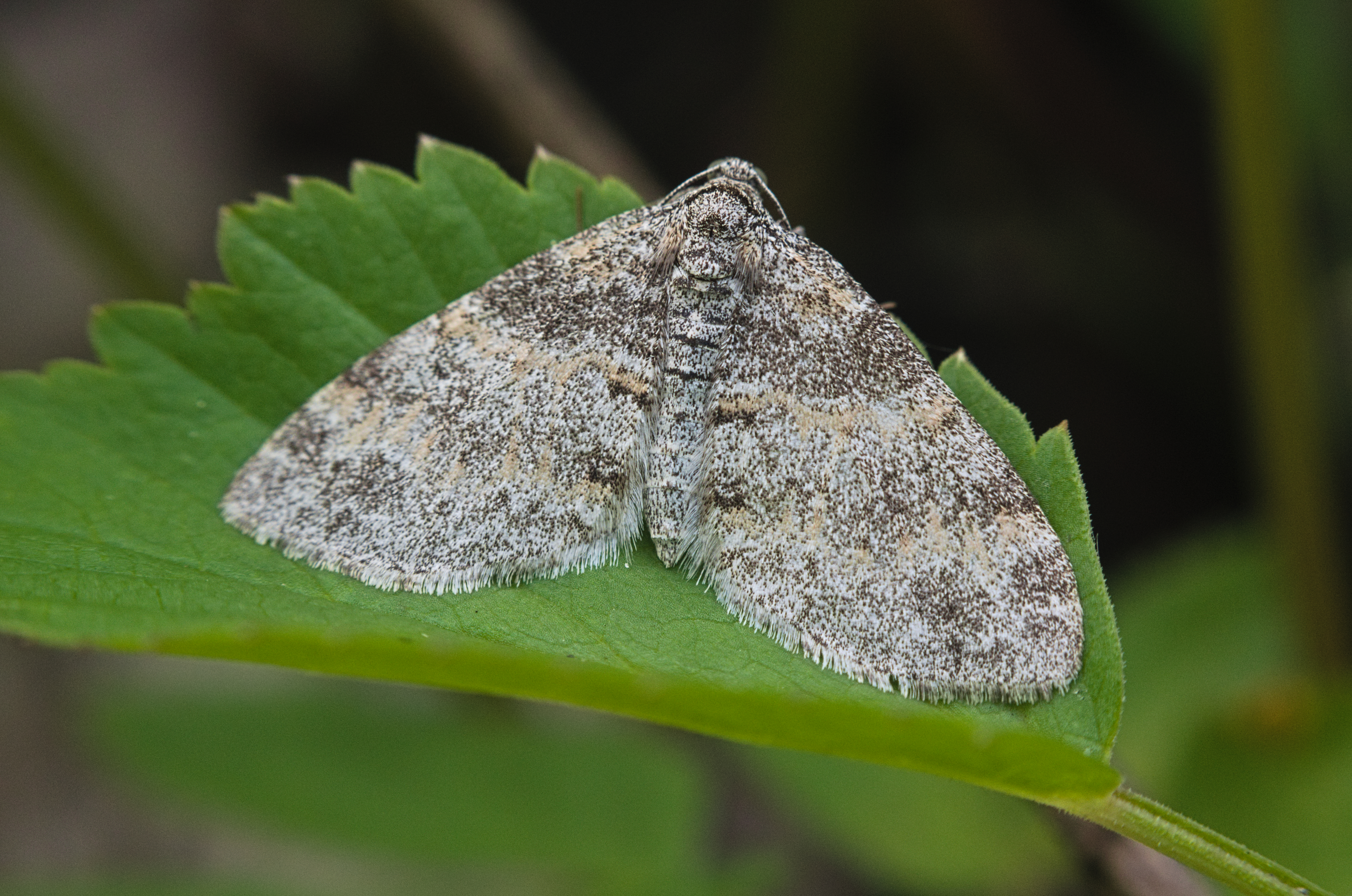

Scientific classification
- Kingdom: Animalia
- Phylum: Arthropoda
- Class: Insecta
- Order: Lepidoptera
- Family: Geometridae
- Genus: Lobophora
- Species: L. halterata

Binomial name
- Lobophora halterata (Hufnagel, 1767)

= Lobophora halterata =

Species of moth

Lobophora halterata, the seraphim, is a moth of the family Geometridae. It was first described by Johann Siegfried Hufnagel in 1767. The species can be found in central and northern Europe and a few localities in southern Europe, Siberia, Amur, Primorye, Sakhalin and Japan.

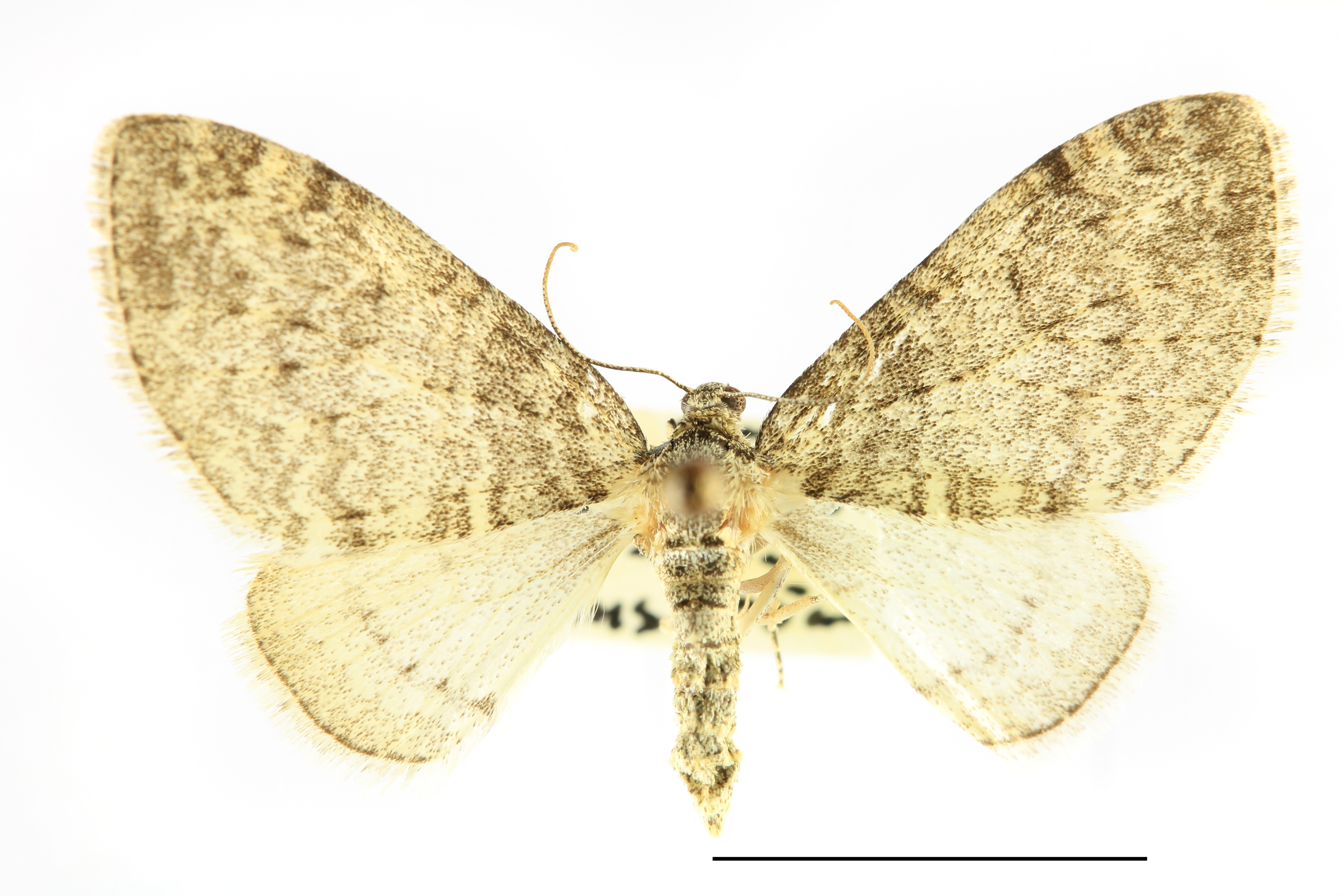

== Description ==
The wingspan is 20–25 mm. The length of the forewings is 12–15 mm. Forewing whitish, with a very slight tinge of brown, at least in the central area; a narrow subbasal dark band, closely followed by conspicuous broader one, the pale line which separates them angulated anteriorly; the lines of the median area ill-defined, dentate. Hindwing white, nearly always with a narrow greyer distal border and sometimes with one or two indistinct lines in outer half. Forewing beneath very weakly but more uniformly marked; hindwing with very distinct discal dot. Variable in the intensity of the markings.

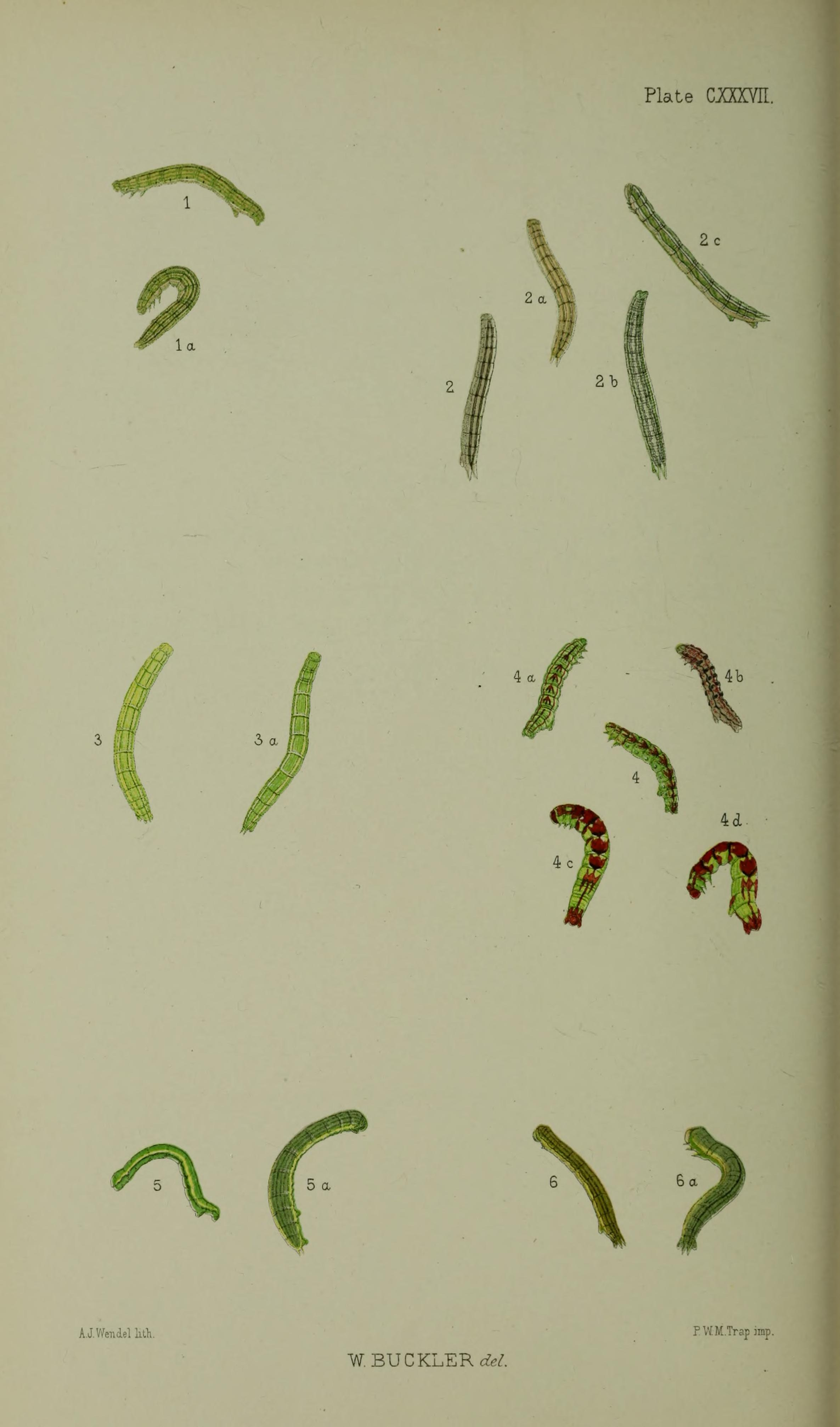
Figs 3,3a larvae after final moult

The caterpillar is green, darker below and between the rings.The body is wrinkled, and with two points on the last ring. The most distinct markings are two yellow lines along the back. The head is notched. The pupa is reddish brown. The cremaster has the shape of a small anchor.

== Biology ==
The moths fly from May to June.

The larvae feed on aspen and poplar.

== Similar species ==
- Trichopteryx carpinata lacks the blackish basal region on the forewing.

== Notes ==
1. The flight season refers to the British Isles. This may vary in other parts of the range.
