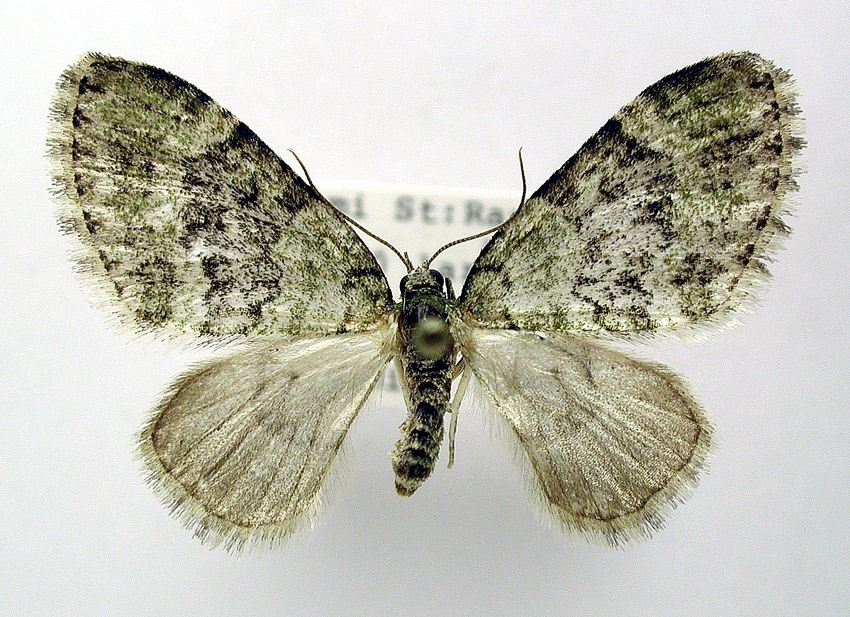

Scientific classification
- Domain: Eukaryota
- Kingdom: Animalia
- Phylum: Arthropoda
- Class: Insecta
- Order: Lepidoptera
- Family: Geometridae
- Genus: Acasis
- Species: A. viretata

Binomial name
- Acasis viretata (Hübner, 1799)

Synonyms
- Geometra viretata Hubner, 1799

= Acasis viretata =

Species of moth

Acasis viretata, the yellow-barred brindle, is a moth of the family Geometridae. The species was first described by Jacob Hübner in 1799. It is found across most of Europe and throughout the Palearctic to Korea. In northern India it is represented by Acacis viretata himalayica (Prout, 1958). It is also present in North America. This species occurs in many different habitats, including deciduous and mixed forests, rocky slopes and valleys, as well as bushy meadows, bogs and taiga areas. In the Alps, it can still be found at an altitude of 1700 meters.

The wingspan ranges from 25–29 mm.It is slender, grey-green moth. The green colour fades quickly and older specimens tend to look yellowish. The forewing is yellowish olive-green, in the middle with a broad, grey transverse band that has wavy inner and outer edges. Along the outer edge of the wing there is a white band interrupted by small, black double spots, this is a characteristic feature. The hindwing is rather small with long hair fringes, silky greyish-white.

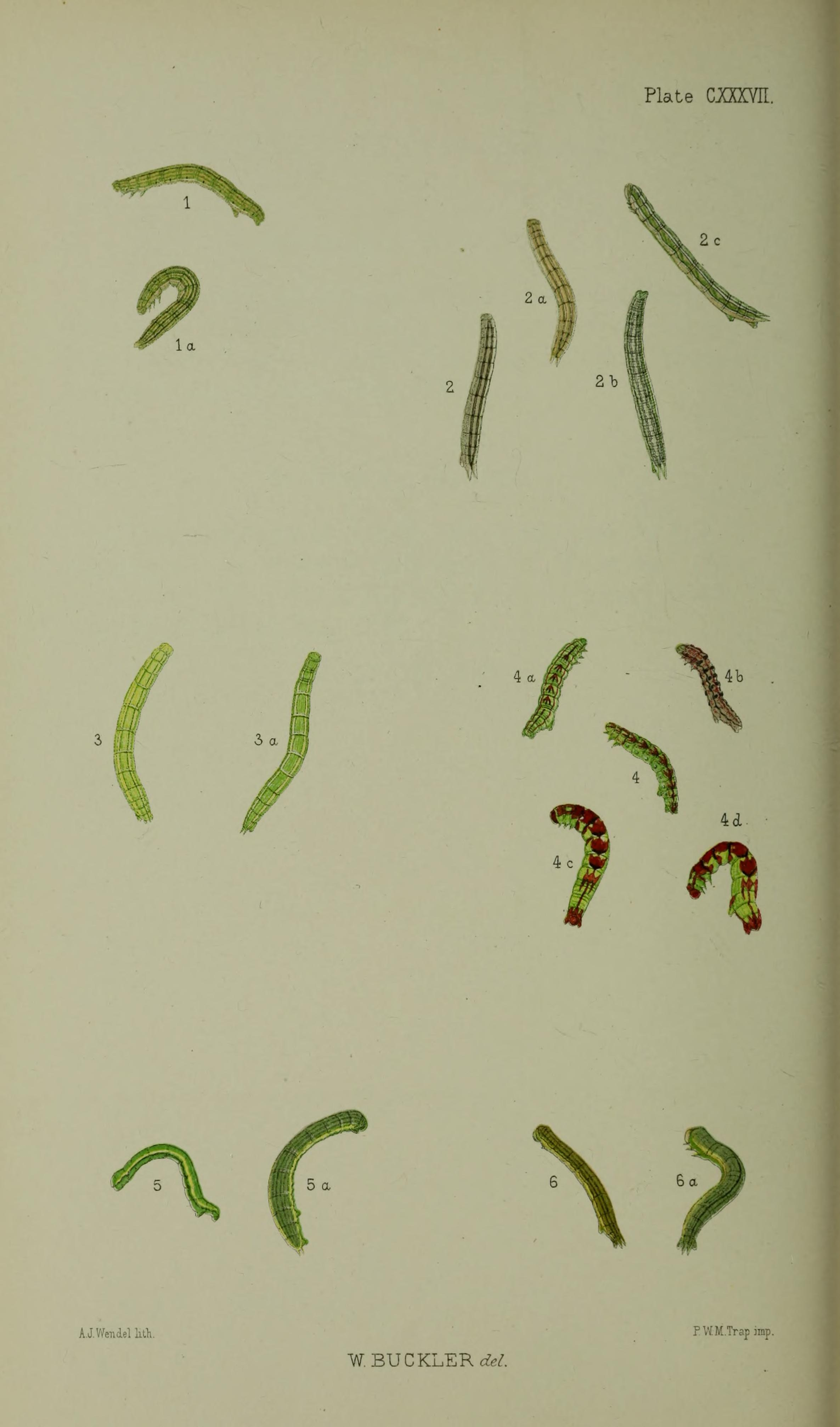
Figs 4,4a,4b larvae after final moult 4c,4d a little magnified

The caterpillar is green, more or less tinged with pinkish; it has three interrupted pink lines on the back, the central one sometimes inclining to purple, and broken up into large wine-red to red heart-shaped spots; the head is brown, sometimes marked with purplish, and there are two tiny points on the last segment. It varies in the green tint and also in marking.

Adults are on wing from mid-April to October in two generations in western Europe.

The larvae feed on a wide variety of plants, including Rhamnus frangula, Hedera helix, Ligustrum, Ilex aquifolium, Cornus sanguinea and Sorbus aucuparia

== Similar species ==
- Acasis appensata
