= Lobophora montanata =

Scientific classification
- Kingdom: Animalia
- Phylum: Arthropoda
- Clade: Pancrustacea
- Class: Insecta
- Order: Lepidoptera
- Family: Geometridae
- Tribe: Trichopterygini
- Genus: Lobophora
- Species: L. montanata

Binomial name
- Lobophora montanata Packard, 1874

Species of moth

Lobophora montanata is a species of geometrid moth in the family Geometridae. It is found in North America.

The MONA or Hodges number for Lobophora montanata is 7641.
