= Carige =

Scientific classification
- Kingdom: Animalia
- Phylum: Arthropoda
- Class: Insecta
- Order: Lepidoptera
- Family: Geometridae
- Tribe: Trichopterygini
- Genus: Carige; Walker, 1862

Genus of moths

Carige is a genus of moths in the family Geometridae.

== Species ==
- Carige duplicaria (Walker, 1862)
- Carige cruciplaga (Walker, 1861) (from India)
- Carige lunulineata Moore, 1888 (from India)
- Carige rachiaria Swinhoe, 1891 (from India)
