= Acasis =

- Acasis viretata

Scientific classification
- Kingdom: Animalia
- Phylum: Arthropoda
- Class: Insecta
- Order: Lepidoptera
- Family: Geometridae
- Tribe: Trichopterygini
- Genus: Acasis; Duponchel, 1845

Synonyms
- Agia Hulst, 1896

Genus of geometer moths

Acasis is a genus of moths in the family Geometridae erected by Philogène Auguste Joseph Duponchel in 1845.

== Species ==
- Acasis appensata (Eversmann, 1842)
- Acasis viretata (Hübner, 1799) – yellow-barred brindle
- Acasis viridata (Packard, 1873) – olive-and-black carpet
