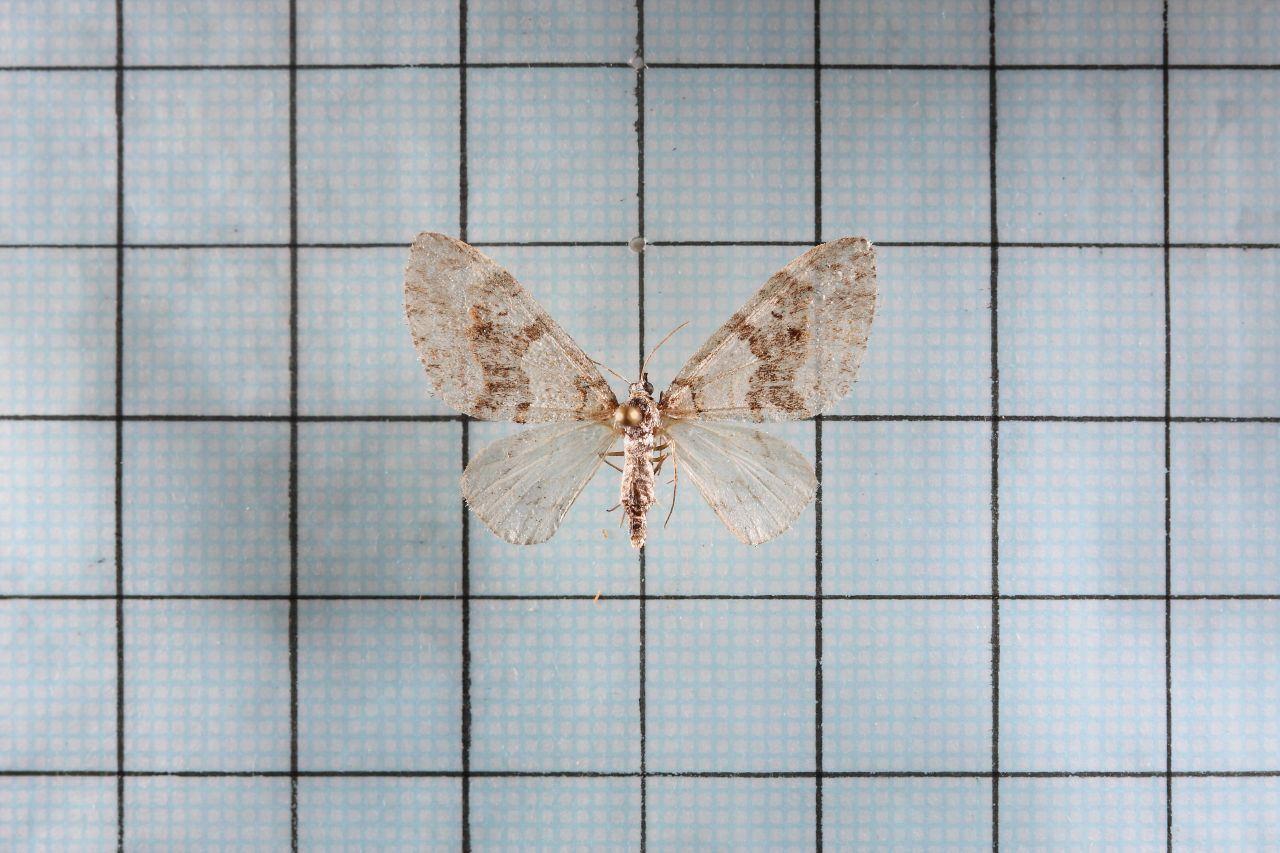

Scientific classification
- Kingdom: Animalia
- Phylum: Arthropoda
- Class: Insecta
- Order: Lepidoptera
- Family: Geometridae
- Genus: Esakiopteryx
- Species: E. venusta

Binomial name
- Esakiopteryx venusta Yazaki, 1986

= Esakiopteryx venusta =

Species of moth

Esakiopteryx venusta is a moth of the family Geometridae. It is found in Taiwan.
