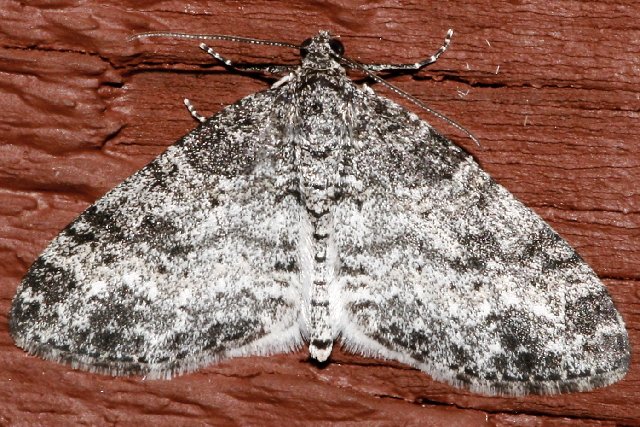

Scientific classification
- Kingdom: Animalia
- Phylum: Arthropoda
- Class: Insecta
- Order: Lepidoptera
- Family: Geometridae
- Genus: Lobophora
- Species: L. nivigerata

Binomial name
- Lobophora nivigerata Walker, 1862

= Lobophora nivigerata =

Species of moth

Lobophora nivigerata, the powdered bigwing or two-lined aspen looper, is a moth in the family Geometridae. The species was first described by Francis Walker in 1862. It is found in North America.

The MONA or Hodges number for Lobophora nivigerata is 7640.
