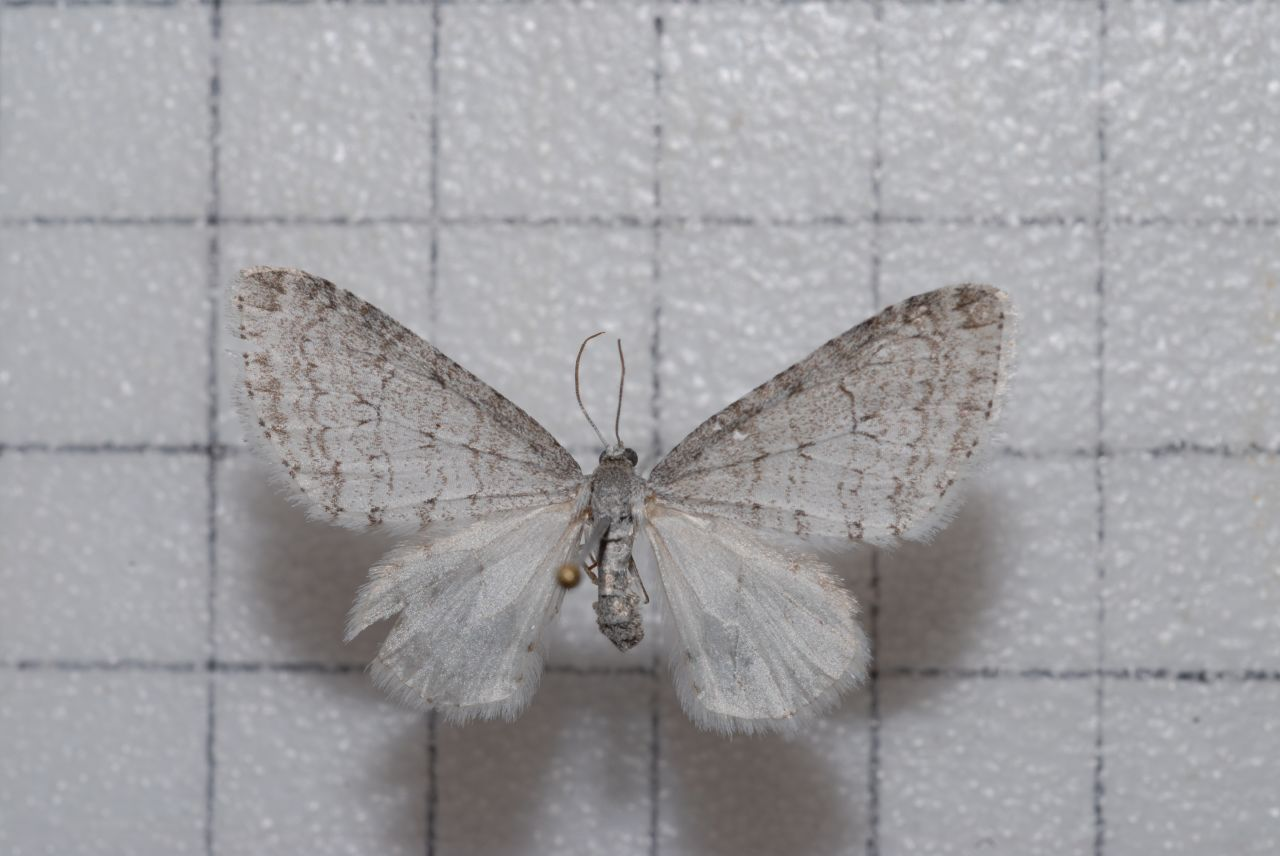

Scientific classification
- Domain: Eukaryota
- Kingdom: Animalia
- Phylum: Arthropoda
- Class: Insecta
- Order: Lepidoptera
- Family: Geometridae
- Genus: Trichopteryx
- Species: T. fusconotata

Binomial name
- Trichopteryx fusconotata Hashimoto, 1983

= Trichopteryx fusconotata =

Species of moth

Trichopteryx fusconotata is a species of moth of the family Geometridae. It is found in Taiwan.
