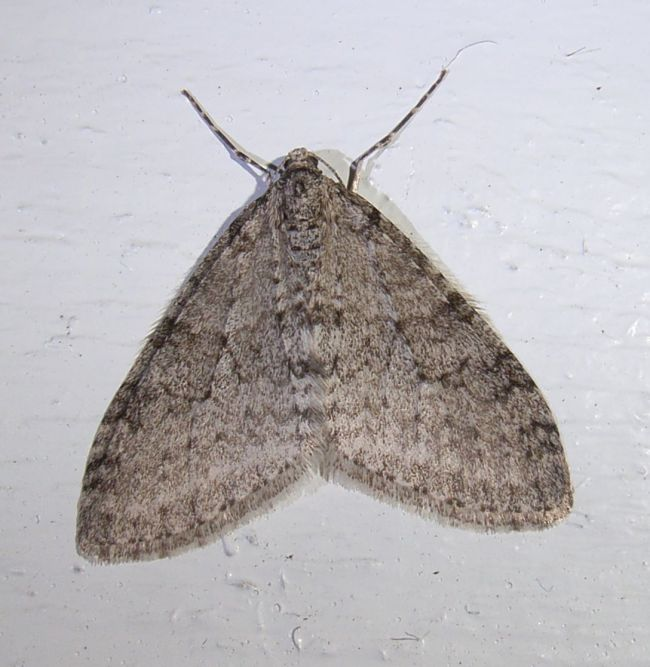
- Trichopteryx carpinata

Scientific classification
- Domain: Eukaryota
- Kingdom: Animalia
- Phylum: Arthropoda
- Class: Insecta
- Order: Lepidoptera
- Family: Geometridae
- Tribe: Trichopterygini
- Genus: Trichopteryx; Hübner, 1825

= Trichopteryx (moth) =

Genus of moths

Trichopteryx is a genus of moths in the family Geometridae erected by the German entomologist, Jacob Hübner in 1825.

== Species ==
- Trichopteryx carpinata (Borkhausen, 1794)
- Trichopteryx exportata (Staudinger, 1897)
- Trichopteryx fastuosa Inoue, 1958
- Trichopteryx fui Yazaki, 2002
- Trichopteryx fusconotata Hashimoto, 1983
- Trichopteryx grisearia (Leech, 1897)
- Trichopteryx hemana (Butler, 1878)
- Trichopteryx polycommata (Denis & Schiffermüller, 1775)
- Trichopteryx potopolskii Viidalepp, 1988
- Trichopteryx terranea (Butler, 1879)
- Trichopteryx ussurica (Wehrli, 1927)
- Trichopteryx veritata Pearsall, 1907
