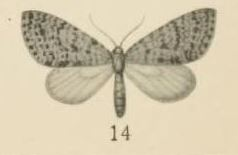

Scientific classification
- Kingdom: Animalia
- Phylum: Arthropoda
- Class: Insecta
- Order: Lepidoptera
- Family: Geometridae
- Tribe: Trichopterygini
- Genus: Episteira; Warren, 1899

= Episteira =

Genus of moths

Episteira is a genus of moths in the family Geometridae described by Warren in 1899.

== Species ==
- Episteira africana (Aurivillius, 1910)
- Episteira atrospila (Strand, 1915)
- Episteira colligata Warren, 1899
- Episteira confusidentata (Warren, 1897)
- Episteira frustrata L B. Prout, 1935
- Episteira mouliniei Legrand, 1971
- Episteira nigrilinearia (Leech, 1897)
- Episteira protima (Turner, 1907)
