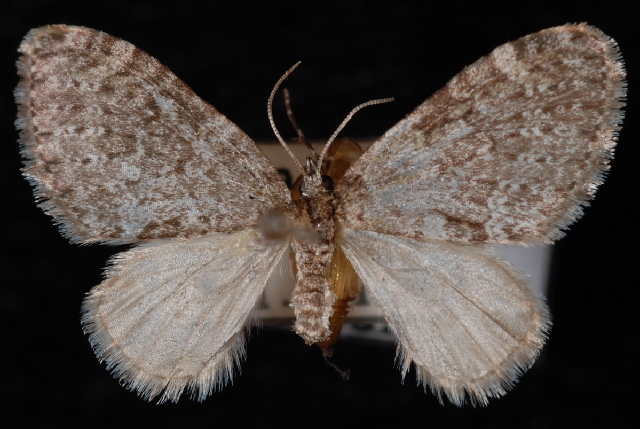

Scientific classification
- Kingdom: Animalia
- Phylum: Arthropoda
- Clade: Pancrustacea
- Class: Insecta
- Order: Lepidoptera
- Family: Geometridae
- Genus: Acasis
- Species: A. viridata

Binomial name
- Acasis viridata (Packard, 1873)

Synonyms
- Lobophora viridata Packard, 1873; Acasis eborata (Hulst, 1896)

= Acasis viridata =

Olive-and-black carpet

Species of moth

Acasis viridata, the olive-and-black carpet, is a species of moth belonging to the family Geometridae. It was described by Alpheus Spring Packard in 1873. It is found from Newfoundland to British Columbia and the adjacent northern part of the United States, south in the east to Florida, and south in the west to Colorado and Oregon.

The wingspan is 18–20 mm. Adults are on wing from April to July in North America. There is one generation per year.

The larvae feed on the flower heads of Viburnum cassinoides.
