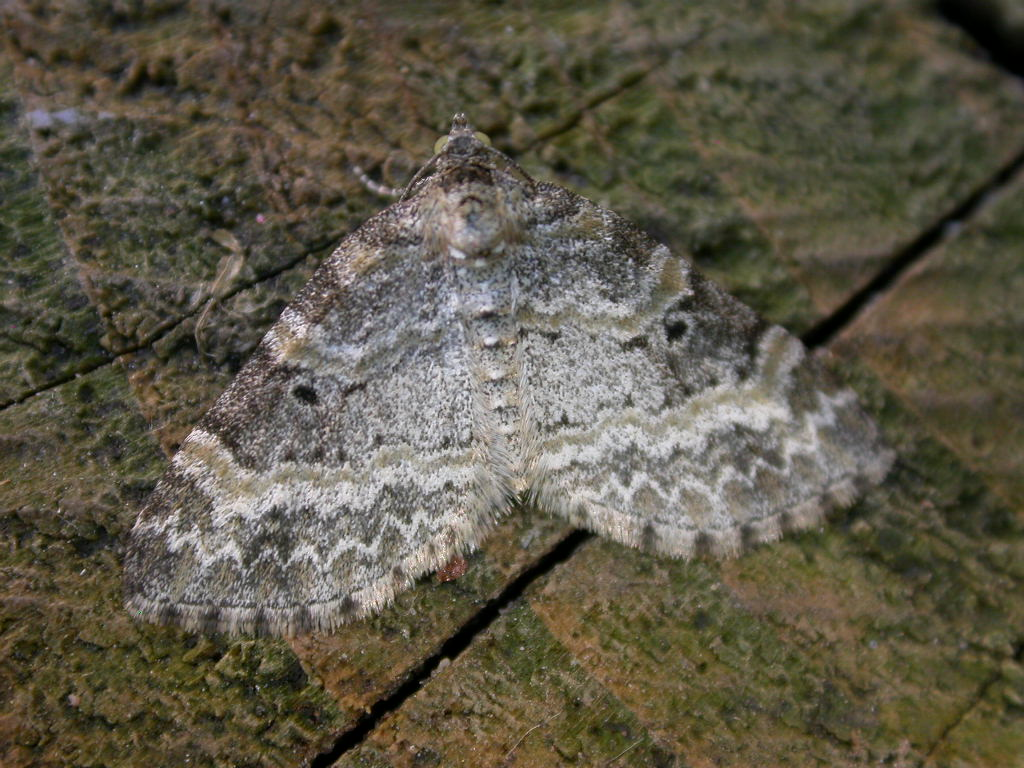
- Pterapherapteryx sexalata

Scientific classification
- Kingdom: Animalia
- Phylum: Arthropoda
- Clade: Pancrustacea
- Class: Insecta
- Order: Lepidoptera
- Family: Geometridae
- Tribe: Trichopterygini
- Genus: Pterapherapteryx; Curtis, 1825
- Species: P. sexalata

Binomial name
- Pterapherapteryx sexalata (Retzius, 1783)

= Pterapherapteryx =

Genus of moths

Pterapherapteryx is a monotypic genus of moth in the family Geometridae erected by John Curtis in 1825. Its only species, Pterapherapteryx sexalata, the small seraphim, was first described by Anders Jahan Retzius in 1783. It is found in central and northern Europe and south-east Russia.

The wingspan is 22–26 mm. The ground colour of the forewings is pale grey. They have dark grey crosslines. and two central bands: one in the basal field and one in the marginal field. The hindwings are unmarked pale grey or whitish.

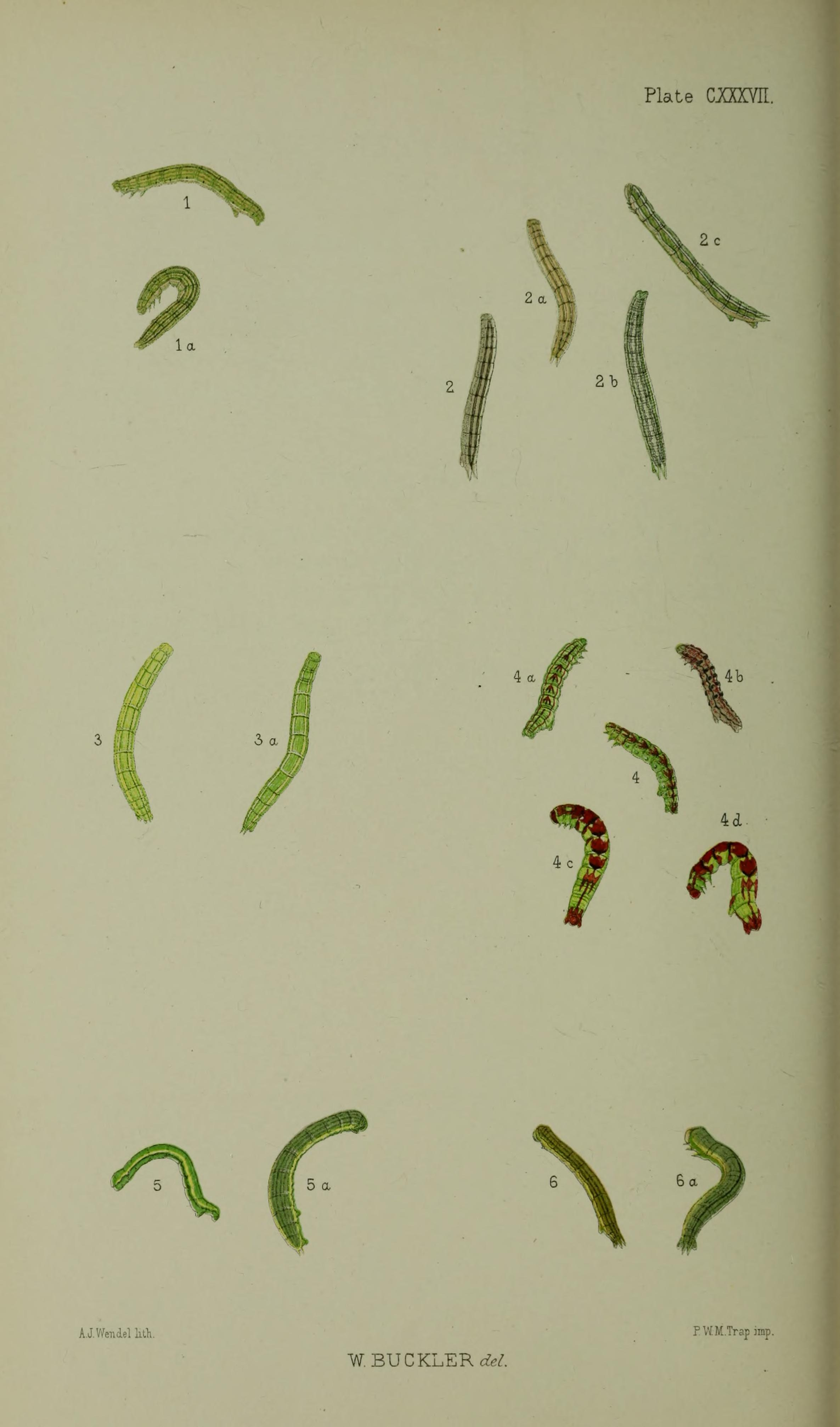
Figs 2,2a,2b,2c larvae after final moult

The caterpillar is green, much wrinkled. It has three whitish lines or stripes along the dorsum, and in some examples there is a white line low down along the sides; the head, which inclines to yellowish, is notched, and there are two pinkish points on the last ring of the body.

The moth is on wing from May to August, depending on the location.

The larvae feed on willow.
