= Brabira =

Scientific classification
- Kingdom: Animalia
- Phylum: Arthropoda
- Class: Insecta
- Order: Lepidoptera
- Family: Geometridae
- Tribe: Trichopterygini
- Genus: Brabira; Moore, 1888
- Species: B. artemidora

Binomial name
- Brabira artemidora (Oberthür, 1884)

Genus of moths

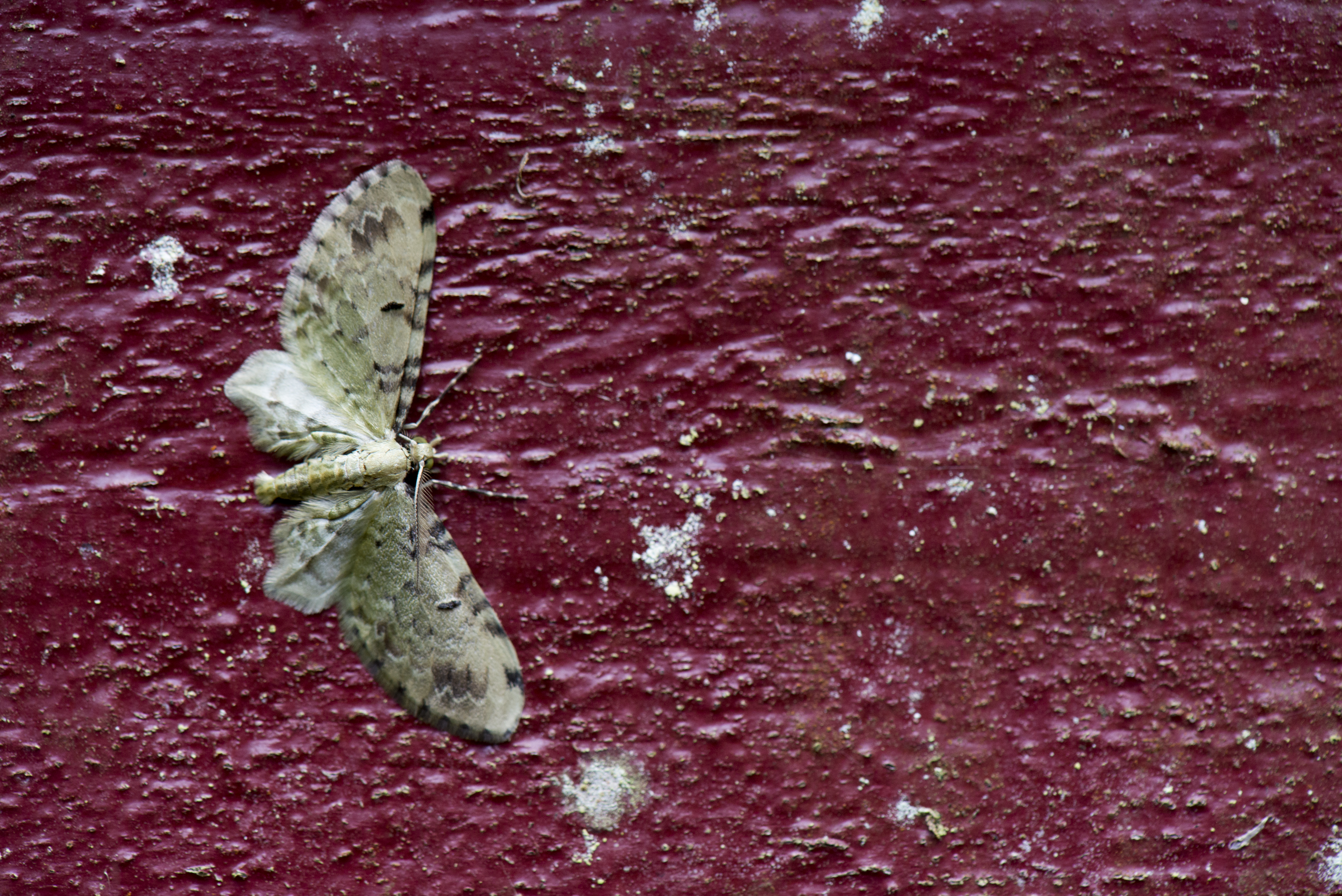
Brabira

Brabira is a monotypic moth genus in the family Geometridae described by Frederic Moore in 1888. Its only species, Brabira artemidora, was first described by Charles Oberthür in 1884. It is commonly found in the north western Sahara where it plays an important part in desert ecology.
