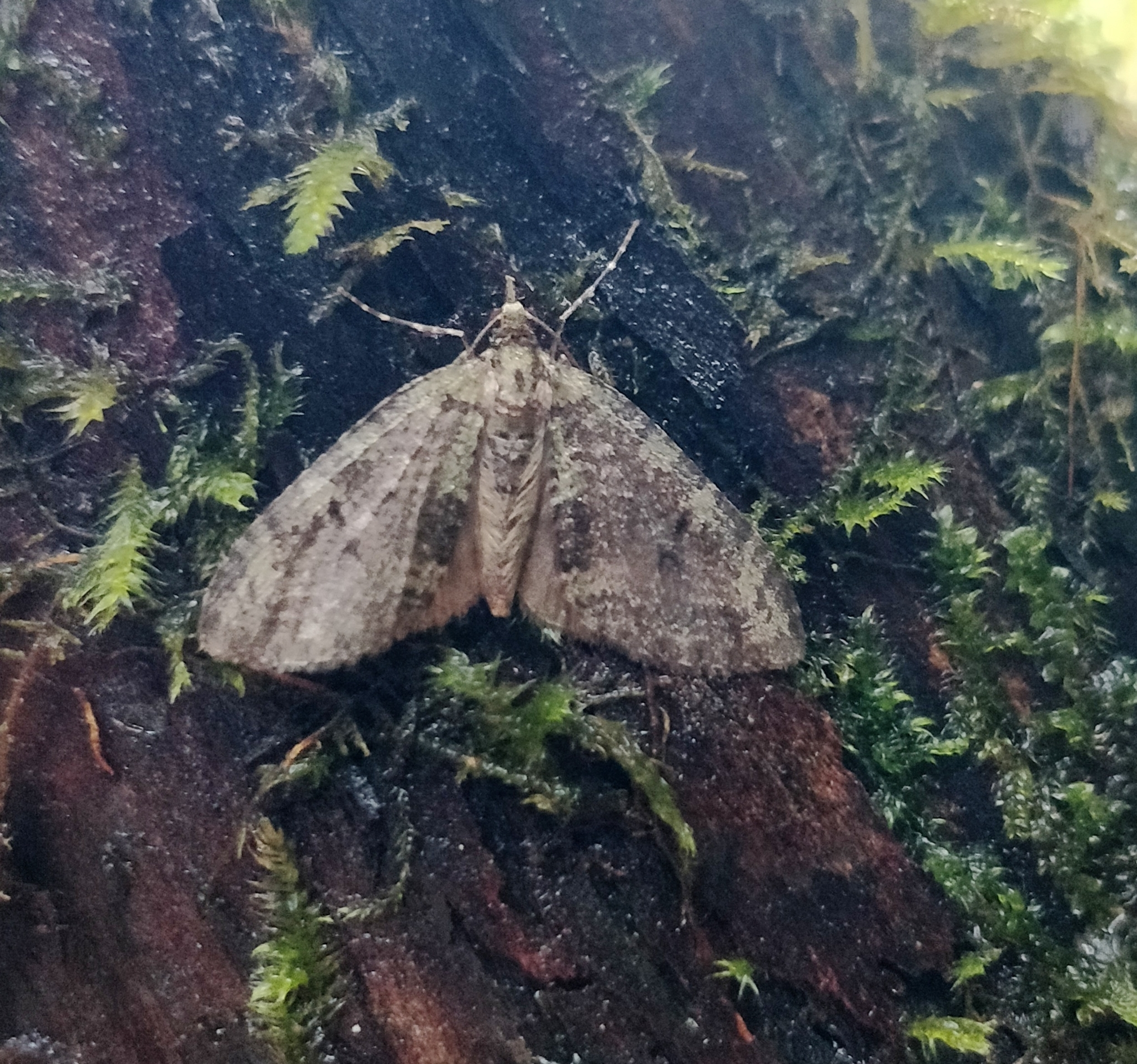

Scientific classification
- Kingdom: Animalia
- Phylum: Arthropoda
- Class: Insecta
- Order: Lepidoptera
- Family: Geometridae
- Tribe: Trichopterygini
- Genus: Episauris; Rebel, 1898
- Species: E. kiliani

Binomial name
- Episauris kiliani Rebel, 1898

= Episauris =

Genus of moths

Episauris is a monotypic moth genus in the family Geometridae. Its only species, Episauris kiliani, is known from the Canary Islands. Both the genus and species were first described by Rebel in 1898.
