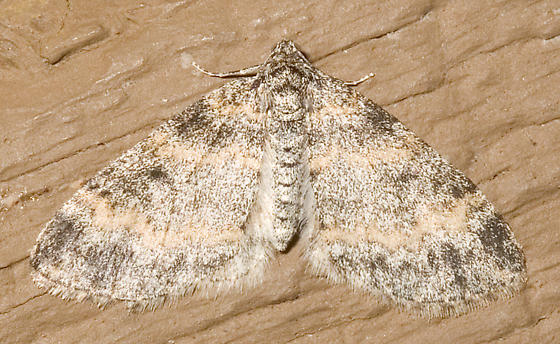

Scientific classification
- Kingdom: Animalia
- Phylum: Arthropoda
- Class: Insecta
- Order: Lepidoptera
- Family: Geometridae
- Genus: Lobophora
- Species: L. magnoliatoidata

Binomial name
- Lobophora magnoliatoidata (Dyar, 1904)

= Lobophora magnoliatoidata =

Species of moth

Lobophora magnoliatoidata is a moth of the family Geometridae first described by Harrison Gray Dyar Jr. in 1904. It is found in western North America in Alberta, British Columbia, Yukon, the Northwest Territories, south through Washington to California.
