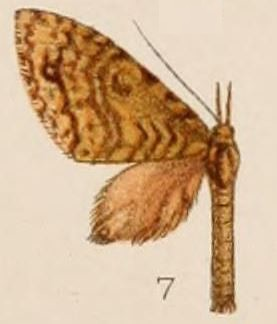

Scientific classification
- Kingdom: Animalia
- Phylum: Arthropoda
- Clade: Pancrustacea
- Class: Insecta
- Order: Lepidoptera
- Family: Geometridae
- Genus: Sauris
- Species: S. proboscidaria

Binomial name
- Sauris proboscidaria Walker, 1862

= Sauris proboscidaria =

Species of moth

Sauris proboscidaria is a moth of the family Geometridae first described by Francis Walker in 1862. It is found in Sri Lanka.
