= Sauris perfasciata =

Scientific classification
- Kingdom: Animalia
- Phylum: Arthropoda
- Clade: Pancrustacea
- Class: Insecta
- Order: Lepidoptera
- Family: Geometridae
- Genus: Sauris
- Species: S. perfasciata

Binomial name
- Sauris perfasciata Hampson, 1895

Species of moth

Sauris perfasciata is a moth of the family Geometridae first described by George Hampson in 1895. It is found in Sri Lanka.
