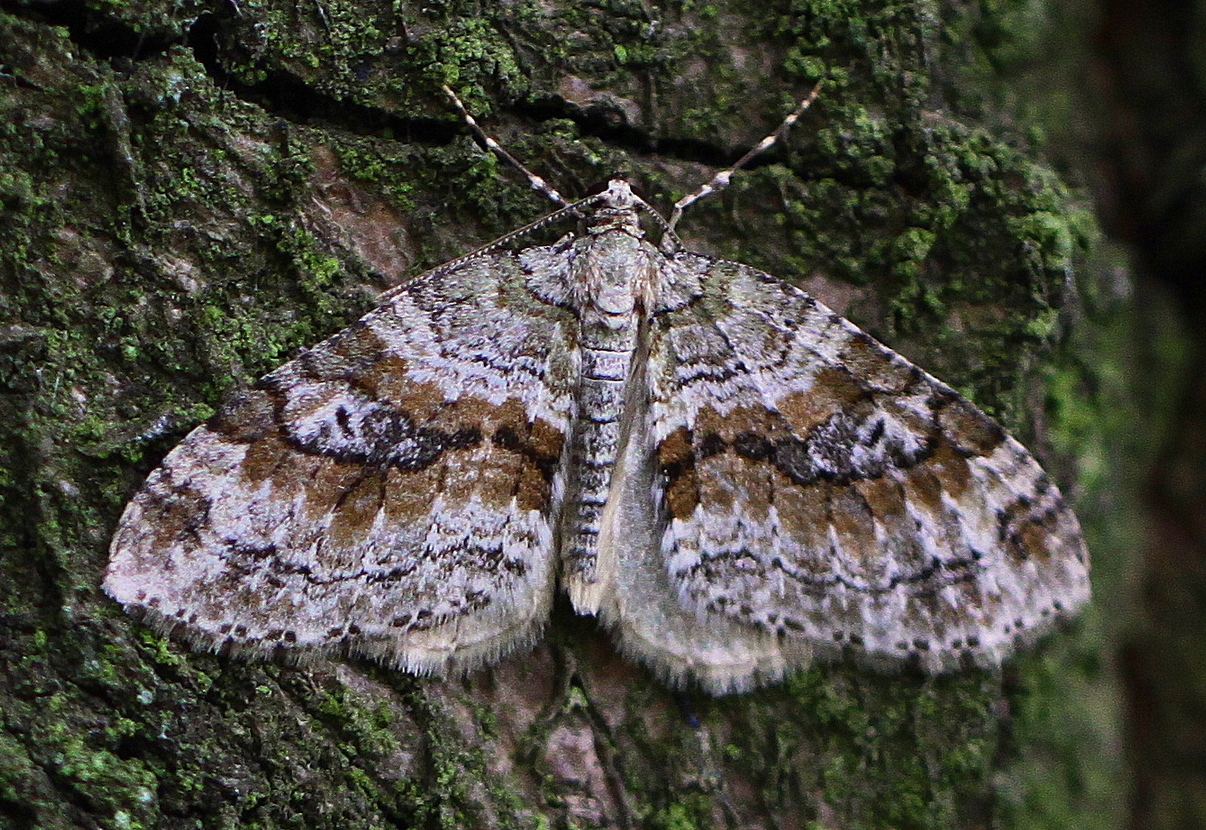
- Nothocasis sertata

Scientific classification
- Kingdom: Animalia
- Phylum: Arthropoda
- Clade: Pancrustacea
- Class: Insecta
- Order: Lepidoptera
- Family: Geometridae
- Tribe: Trichopterygini
- Genus: Nothocasis; Prout, 1936

= Nothocasis =

Genus of moths

Nothocasis is a genus of moths in the family Geometridae described by Prout in 1936.

== Species ==
- Nothocasis bellaria (Leech, 1897)
- Nothocasis sertata (Hübner, 1817)
