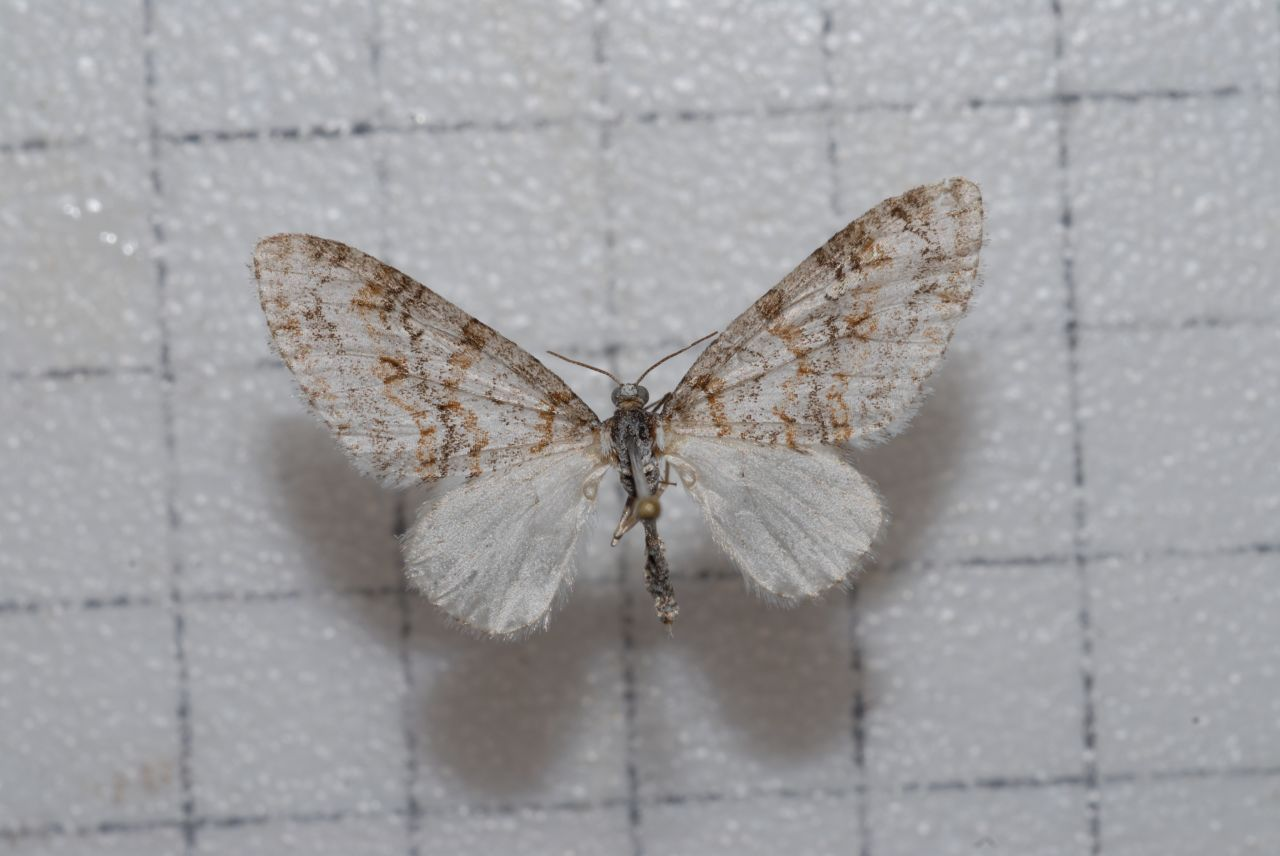

Scientific classification
- Kingdom: Animalia
- Phylum: Arthropoda
- Class: Insecta
- Order: Lepidoptera
- Family: Geometridae
- Genus: Trichopteryx
- Species: T. fastuosa

Binomial name
- Trichopteryx fastuosa Inoue, 1958

= Trichopteryx fastuosa =

Species of moth

Trichopteryx fastuosa is a species of moth of the family Geometridae first described by Hiroshi Inoue in 1958. It is found in Taiwan.

The wingspan is 21–25 mm.
