= Leptostegna =

Scientific classification
- Kingdom: Animalia
- Phylum: Arthropoda
- Class: Insecta
- Order: Lepidoptera
- Family: Geometridae
- Tribe: Trichopterygini
- Genus: Leptostegna

Genus of moths

Leptostegna is a genus of moths in the family Geometridae.
