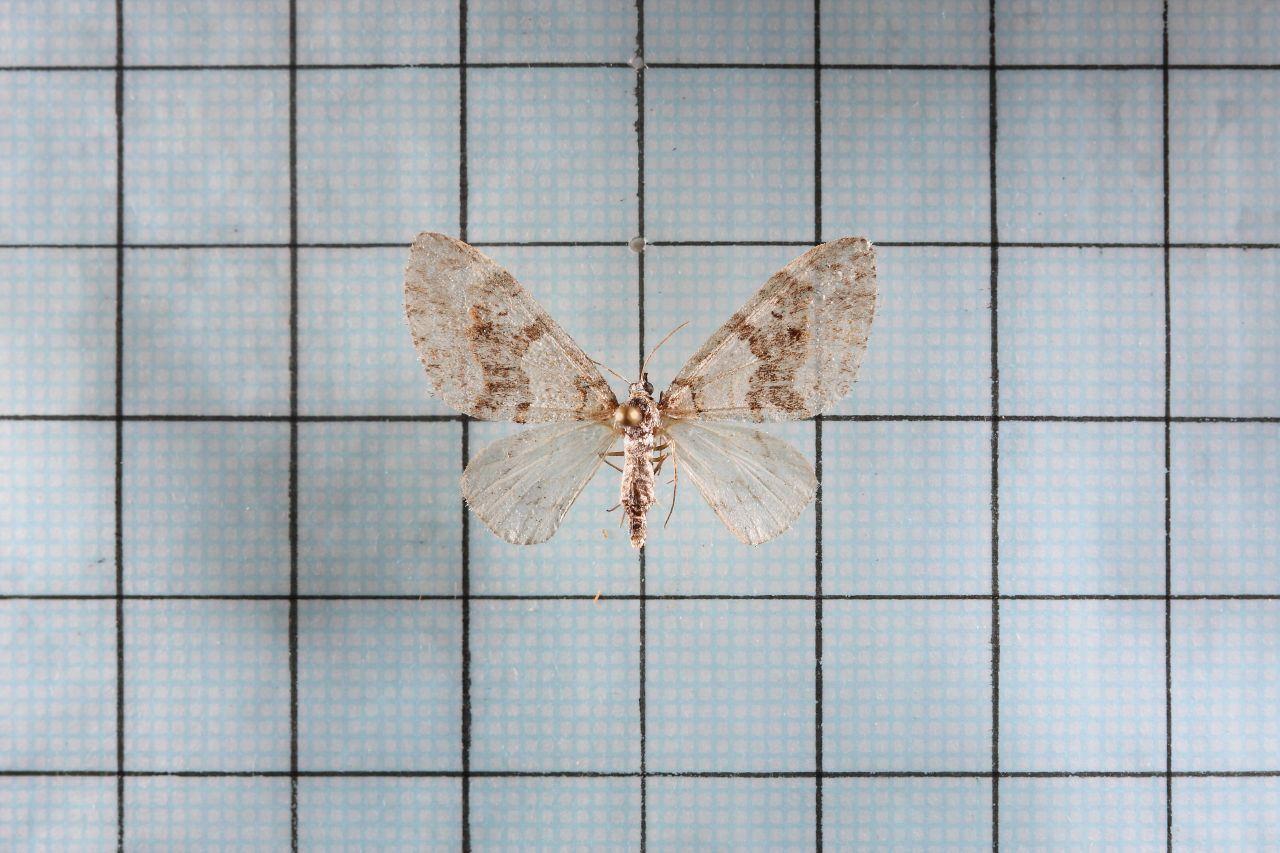
- Esakiopteryx venusta

Scientific classification
- Kingdom: Animalia
- Phylum: Arthropoda
- Class: Insecta
- Order: Lepidoptera
- Family: Geometridae
- Tribe: Trichopterygini
- Genus: Esakiopteryx; Inoue, 1958

= Esakiopteryx =

Genus of moths

Esakiopteryx is a genus of moths in the family Geometridae described by Hiroshi Inoue in 1958.

== Species ==
- Esakiopteryx venusta Yazaki, 1986
- Esakiopteryx volitans (Butler, 1878)
