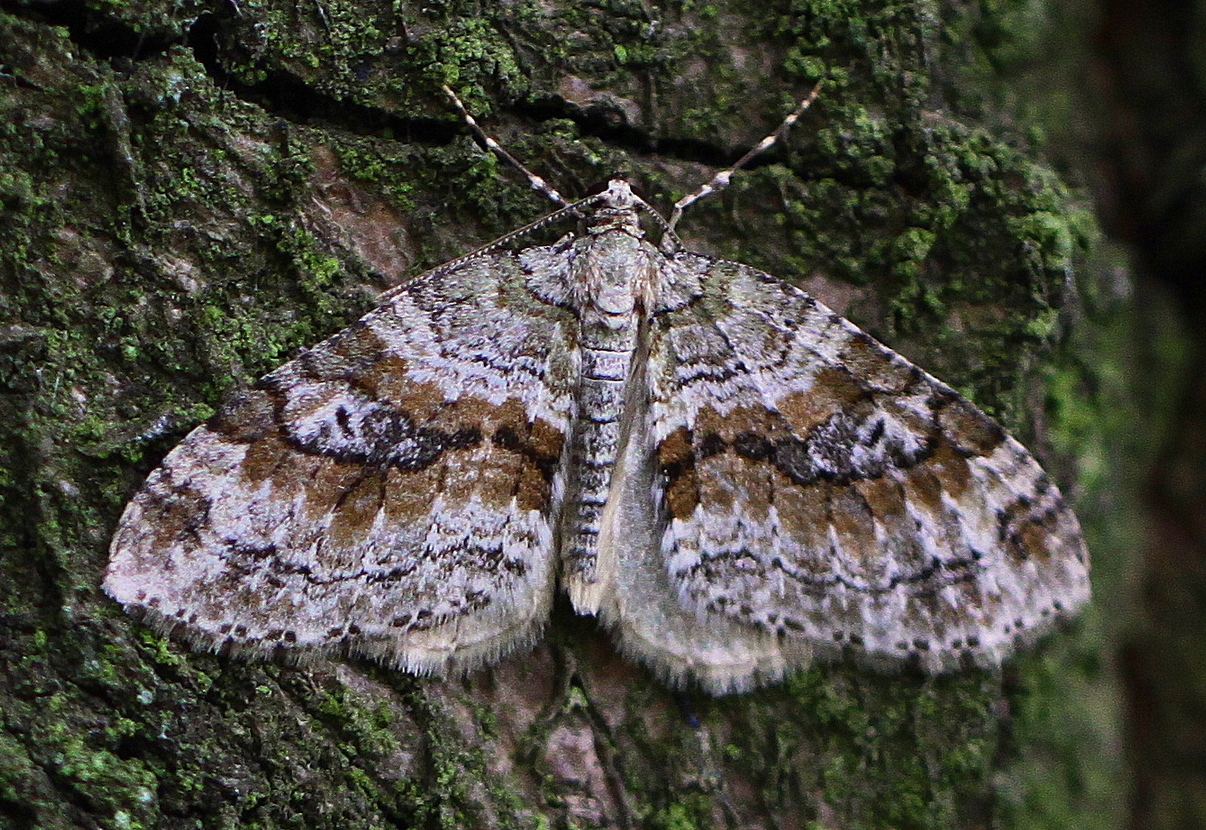

Scientific classification
- Kingdom: Animalia
- Phylum: Arthropoda
- Class: Insecta
- Order: Lepidoptera
- Family: Geometridae
- Genus: Nothocasis
- Species: N. sertata

Binomial name
- Nothocasis sertata (Hübner, 1817)

Synonyms
- Geometra sertata Hubner, 1817

= Nothocasis sertata =

Species of moth

Nothocasis sertata is a moth of the family Geometridae. It is found in large parts of Europe, but primarily in Central Europe. It is found on altitudes up to 1,400 meters.

The wingspan is 26–30 mm. Adults are on wing from August to October.

The larvae feed on Acer pseudoplatanus and Acer campestre. Larvae can be found in May and June. The species overwinters as an egg.
