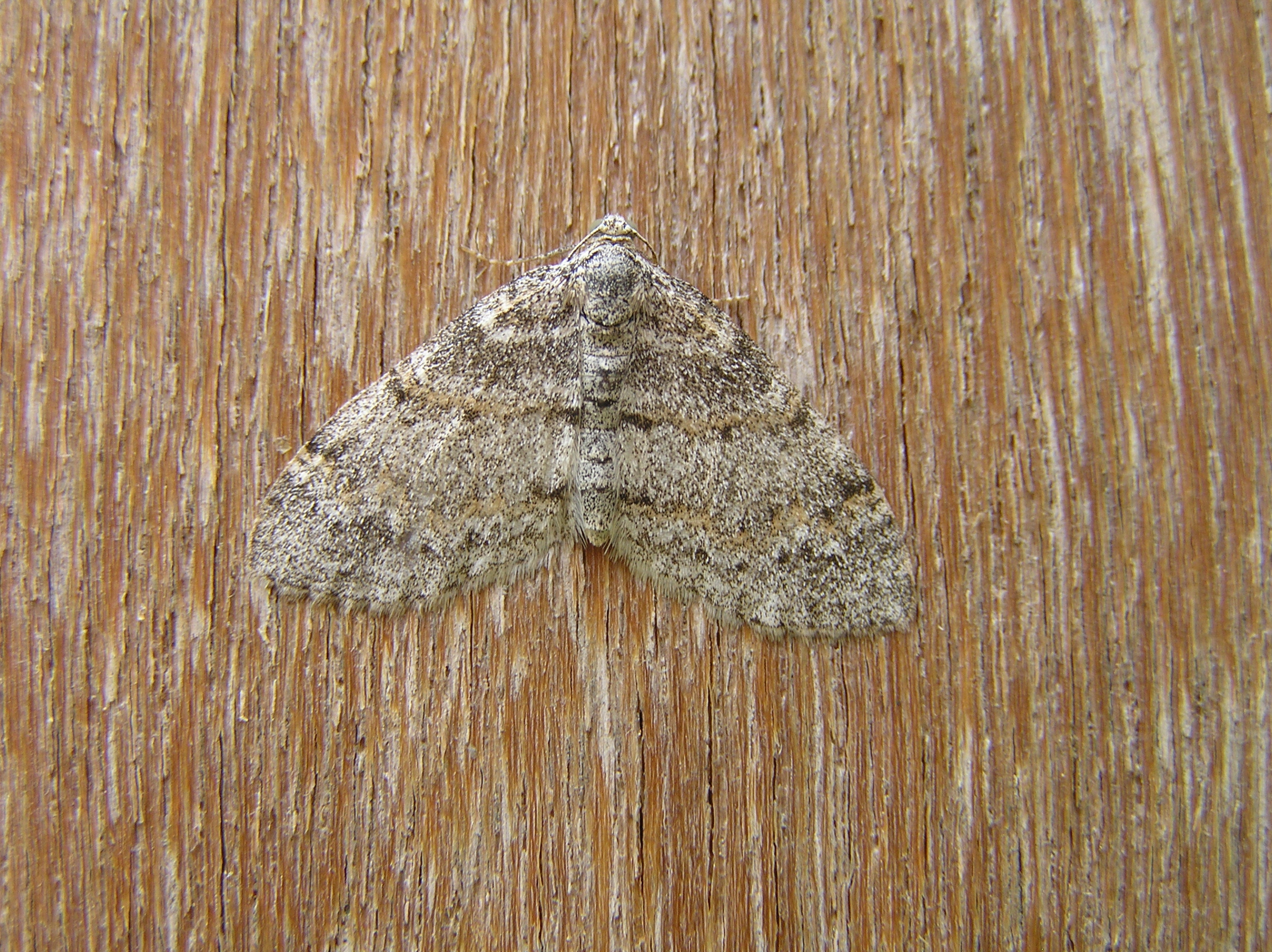
- Lobophora halterata

Scientific classification
- Kingdom: Animalia
- Phylum: Arthropoda
- Class: Insecta
- Order: Lepidoptera
- Family: Geometridae
- Tribe: Trichopterygini
- Genus: Lobophora; Curtis, 1825

= Lobophora (moth) =

Genus of moths

Lobophora is a genus of moths in the family Geometridae erected by John Curtis in 1825.

== Species ==
- Lobophora canavestita (Pearsall, 1906)
- Lobophora halterata (Hufnagel, 1767) – seraphim
- Lobophora magnoliatoidata (Dyar, 1904)
- Lobophora montanata Packard, 1874
- Lobophora nivigerata Walker, 1862
- Lobophora simsata Swett, 1920
