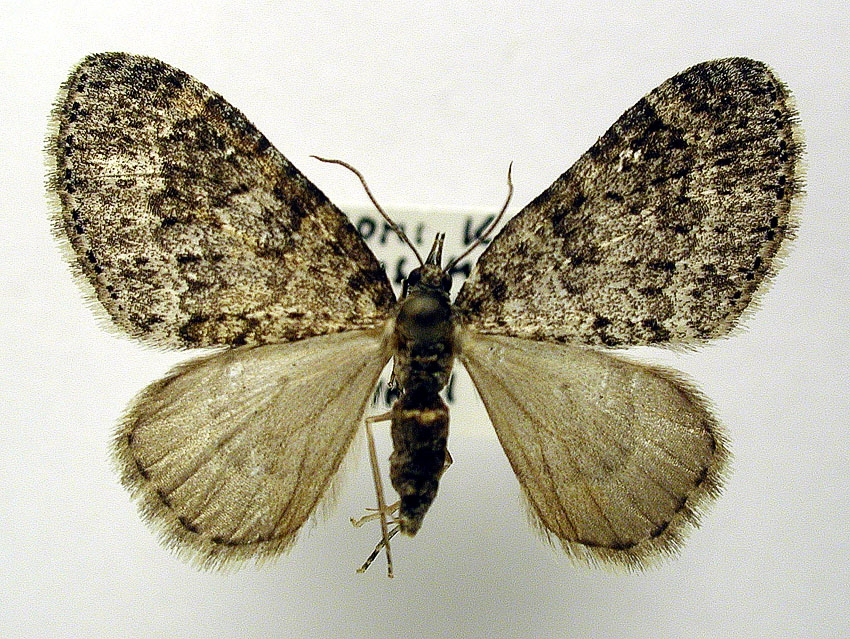

Scientific classification
- Domain: Eukaryota
- Kingdom: Animalia
- Phylum: Arthropoda
- Class: Insecta
- Order: Lepidoptera
- Family: Geometridae
- Genus: Acasis
- Species: A. appensata

Binomial name
- Acasis appensata (Eversmann, 1842)

Synonyms
- Acidalia appensata Eversmann, 1842

= Acasis appensata =

Species of moth

Acasis appensata is a moth of the family Geometridae. It is found in the Palearctic realm.

The wingspan is 21–23 mm.

The larvae feed on Actaea spicata.

== Subspecies ==
- Acasis appensata appensata
- Acasis appensata baicalensis (Bang-Haas, 1906)
