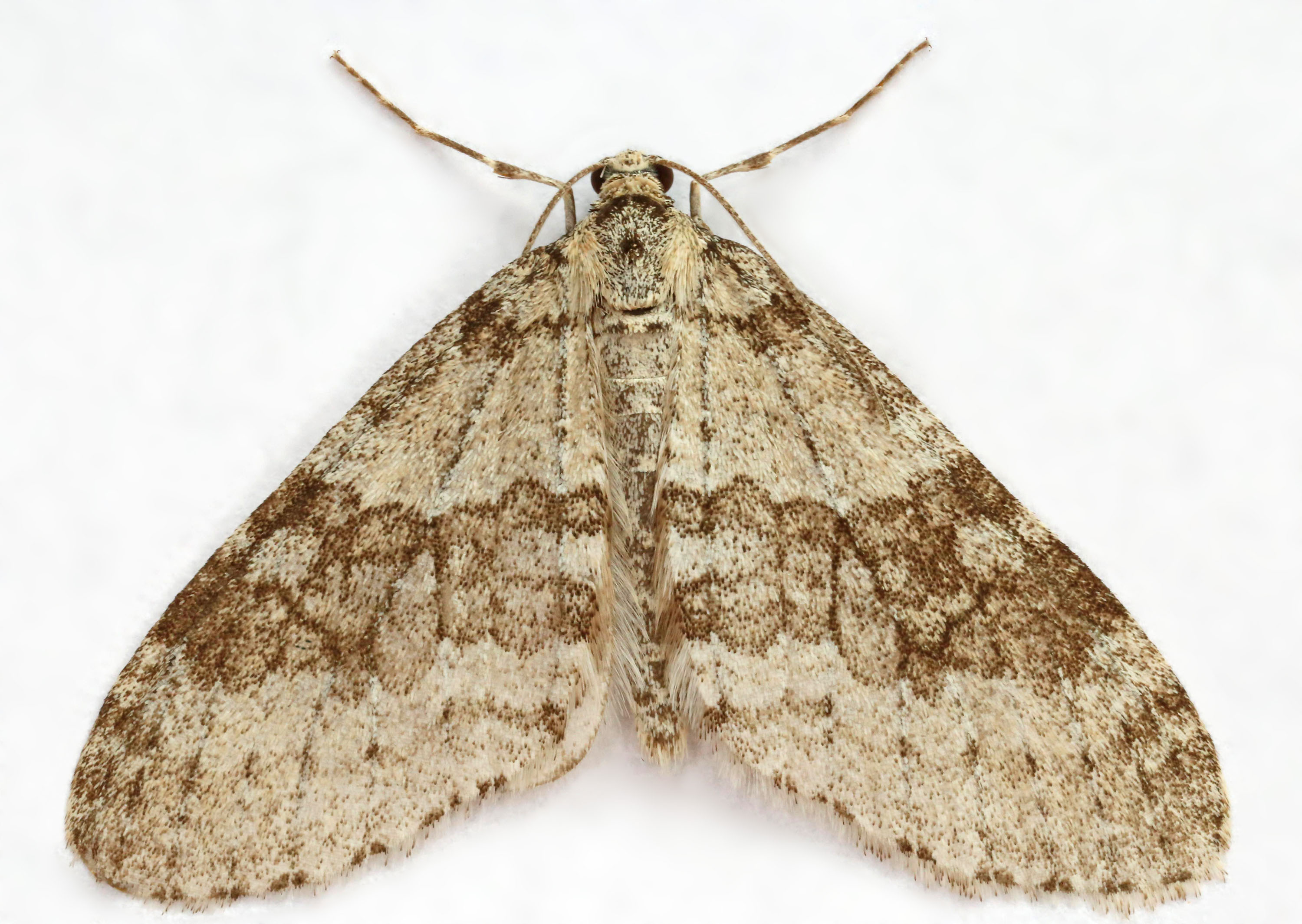
- Trichopteryx carpinata Trawscoed, North Wales, April 2017

Scientific classification
- Domain: Eukaryota
- Kingdom: Animalia
- Phylum: Arthropoda
- Class: Insecta
- Order: Lepidoptera
- Family: Geometridae
- Genus: Trichopteryx
- Species: T. carpinata

Binomial name
- Trichopteryx carpinata (Borkhausen, 1794)

Synonyms
- Phalaena carpinata Borkhausen, 1794; Geometra lobulata Hübner, [1813]

= Trichopteryx carpinata =

Species of moth

Trichopteryx carpinata, the early tooth-striped, is a moth of the family Geometridae. The species was first described by Moritz Balthasar Borkhausen in 1794. It is found in most of Europe (except Iceland, Greece, Sicily, Sardinia and Croatia), east to the eastern Palearctic realm including the Russian Far East, Siberia, and the Ile District, Kazakhstan.

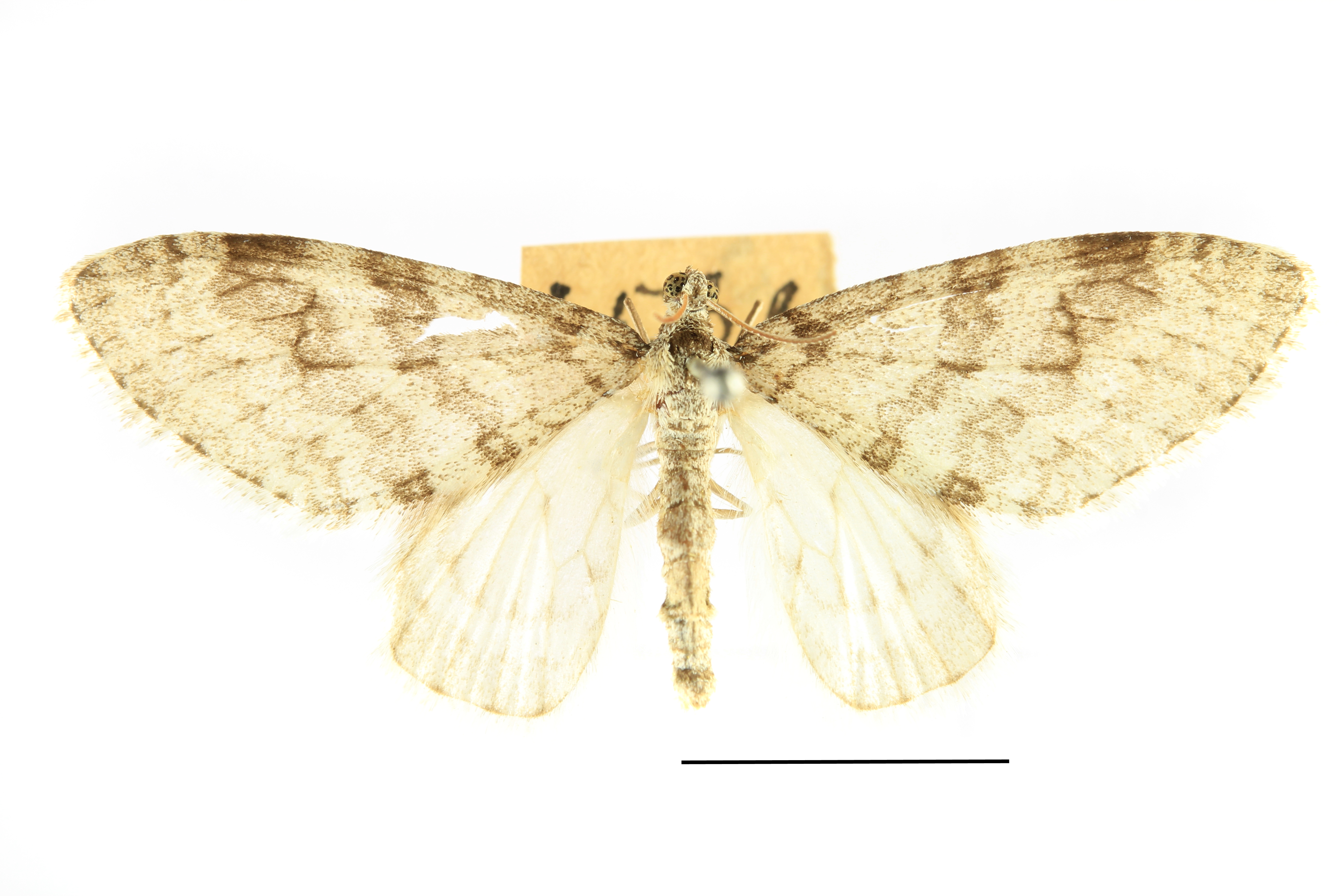

The wingspan is 30–34 mm. "Ground-colour whitish grey, in freshly emerged specimens with a very delicate green tinge; the markings somewhat darker brownish grey, but generally quite weakly expressed. Hindwing whitish, greyer distally, sometimes with one or two fairly well-defined grey lines not far from the distal margin, Male narrower-winged than female. — In ab. fasciata Prout the two central bands are very much darker, sometimes quite deep fuscous, giving the effect of a different species. Frequent in Perthshire. - obscurata Sp. Schneid., described as a local race in Norway, is perhaps transitional towards ab. fasciata, as the bands and lines are said to be more distinct; the ground-colour, however, is also darkened, which is not the case with fasciata. - ab. unifasciata Rbl. is a development of ab. fasciata in which the two bands coalesce in their posterior part, leaving only a pale central part anteriorly, as in polycommata." The larva is naked, green with narrow white longitudinal stripes.

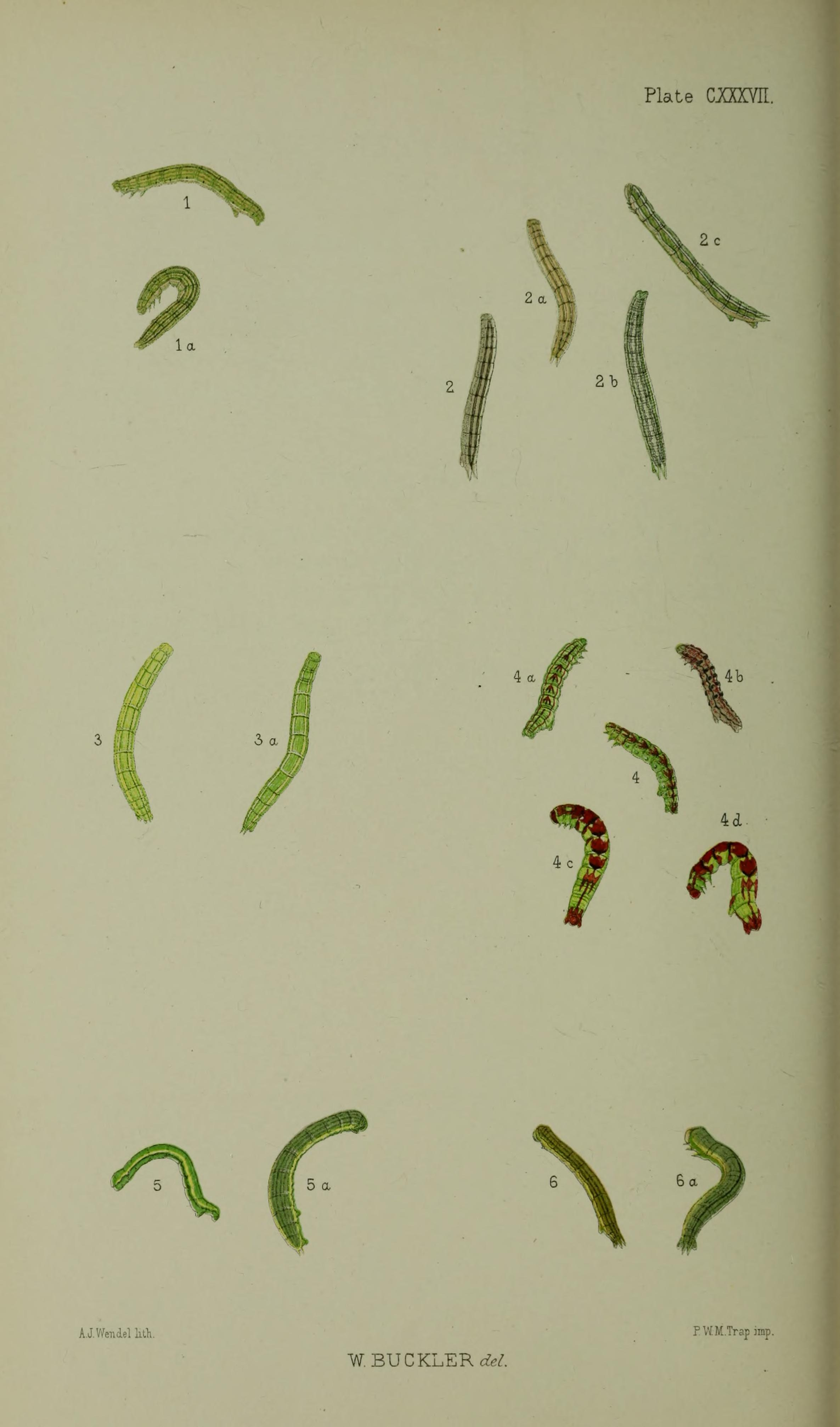
Figs 5,5a larvae after final moult

Adults are on wing from April to May. There is one generation per year. The larvae feed on various trees, including the trees Lonicera, Salix and Betula.
