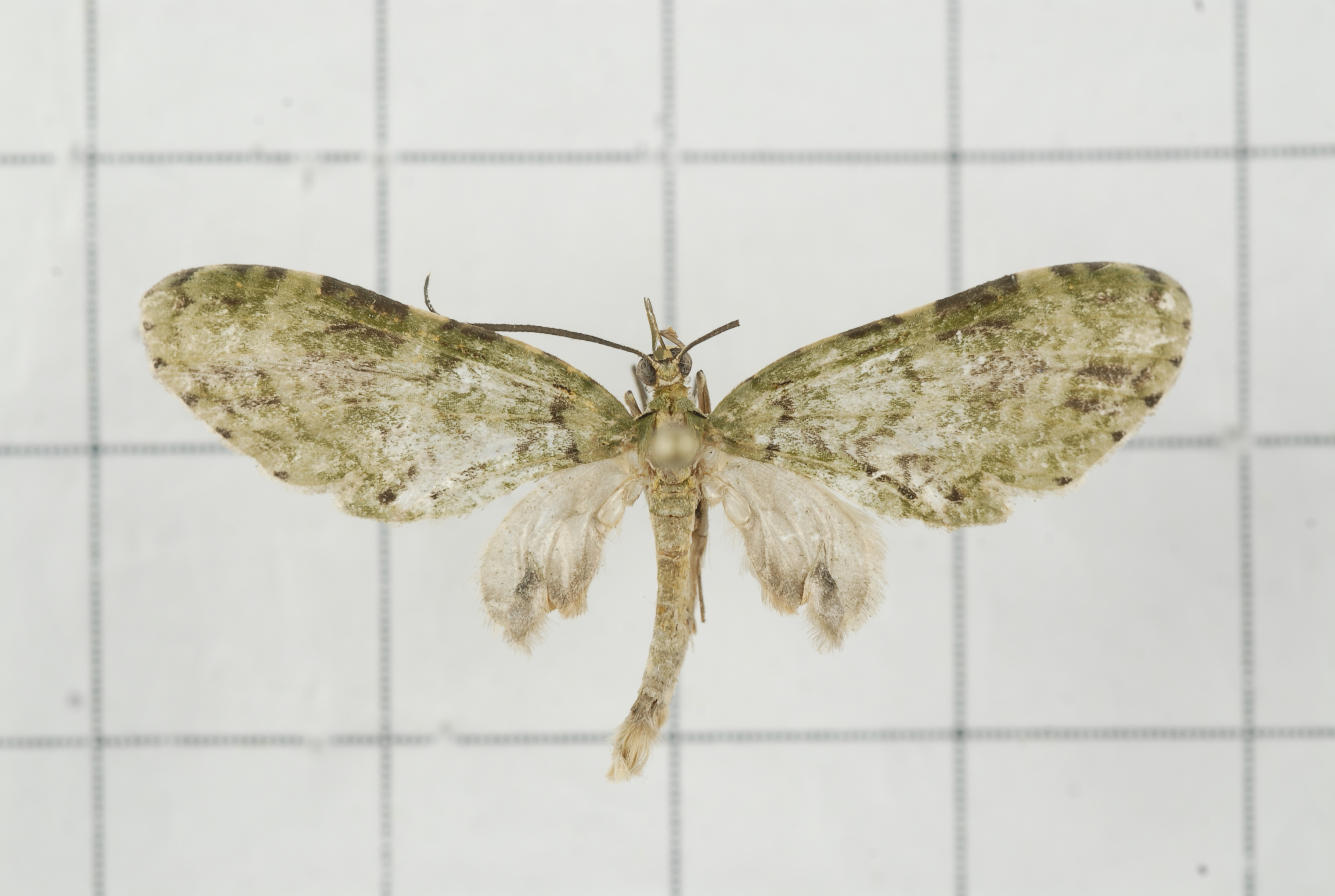
- Male

Scientific classification
- Kingdom: Animalia
- Phylum: Arthropoda
- Class: Insecta
- Order: Lepidoptera
- Family: Geometridae
- Genus: Sauris
- Species: S. interruptata

Binomial name
- Sauris interruptata (Moore, 1888)

Synonyms
- Remodes interruptata Moore, 1888; Sauris triseriata Moore, 1887; Remodes triseriata Moore, 1887; Remodes cinerosa Warren, 1894; Sauris mirabilis Hampson, 1895; Sauris interruptata Moore; Holloway, 1976

= Sauris interruptata =

Species of moth

Sauris interruptata is a species of moth in the family Geometridae. It was first described by Frederic Moore in 1888 and is found in India's north-eastern Himalayas, Sri Lanka, the Ryukyu Islands, Taiwan, Myanmar, Peninsular Malaysia, Borneo, the Philippines, and possibly the Moluccas and New Guinea.
