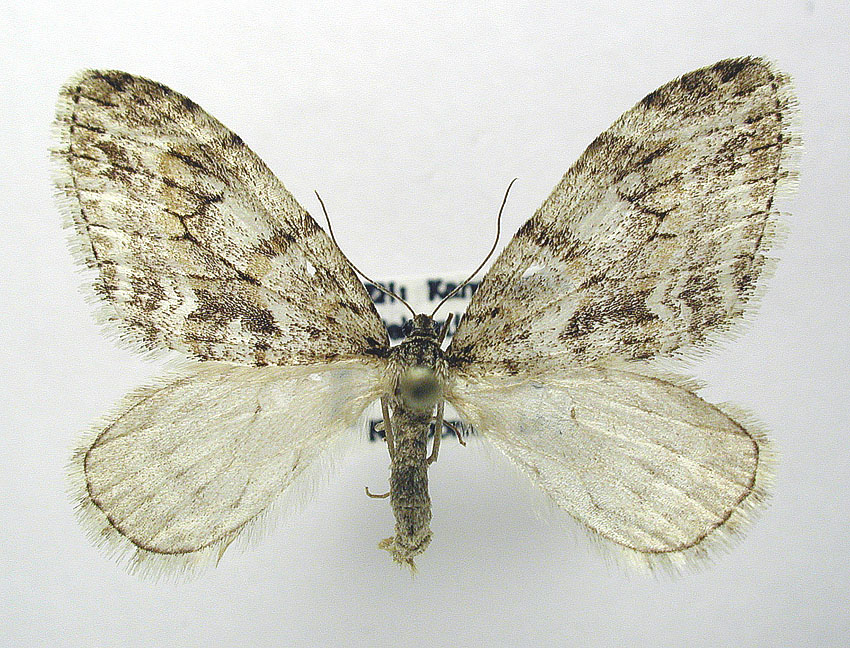

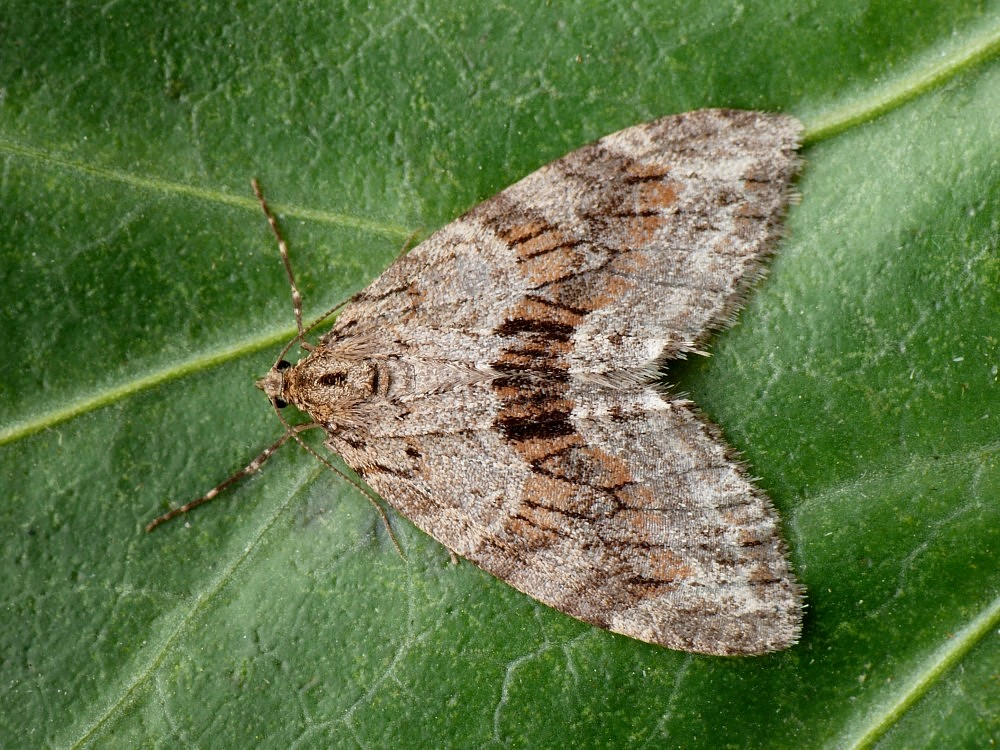

Scientific classification
- Domain: Eukaryota
- Kingdom: Animalia
- Phylum: Arthropoda
- Class: Insecta
- Order: Lepidoptera
- Family: Geometridae
- Genus: Trichopteryx
- Species: T. polycommata

Binomial name
- Trichopteryx polycommata (Denis & Schiffermüller, 1775)

Synonyms
- Geometra polycommata Denis & Schiffermuller, 1775; Lobophora polycommata (Denis & Schiffermüller, 1775)

= Trichopteryx polycommata =

Species of moth

Trichopteryx polycommata, the barred tooth-striped, is a moth of the family Geometridae. The species was first described by Michael Denis and Ignaz Schiffermüller in 1775. It is found in Europe (threatened in Wales) and the Near East, east to the Caucasus, Transcaucasia, the southern Russian Far East (Primorsk) and Japan (Hokkaido).

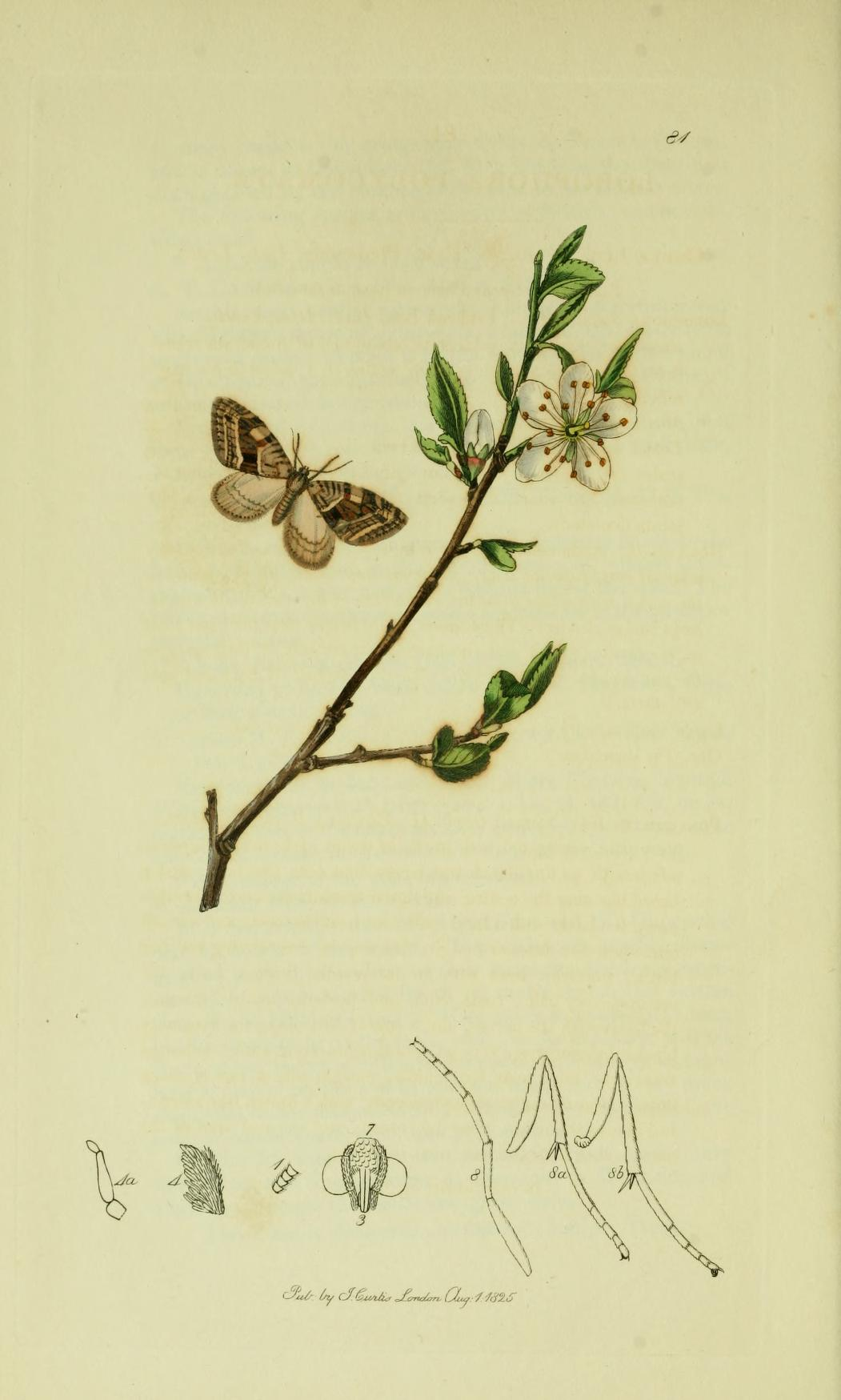
Illustration from John Curtis's British Entomology Volume 6

== Description ==
The wingspan is 33–36 mm. A handsome species and easily recognized by its rather elongate forewing and by the form and arrangement of the rich, red-brown markings on the glossy, brownish-white wing. Hindwing with disco-cellulars biangulate with the 2nd radial emanating from the lower angle. in typical examples, the distal area of the forewing shows a moderately distinct dark band or shade, set off by the pale subterminal. - In ab. prospicua [Prout] however, the white ground-colour is scarcely dark marked, the median band somewhat darkened, in consequence showing up very clearly and effectively. — ab. albinea Tgstr is almost entirely white, the forewing only with very little fuscous marking. The larva is moderately stout, nearly cylindrical, but rather ridged and wrinkled laterally with small anal points; head rather small, rounded, green; body dark green with darker mediodorsal and slender whitish subdorsal line; lateral stripe narrow, white or pale yellow. Pupa of medium thickness, wing and leg-cases dull green, dorsum and abdomen yellowish red-brown, the former with slight greenish tinge anteriorly.

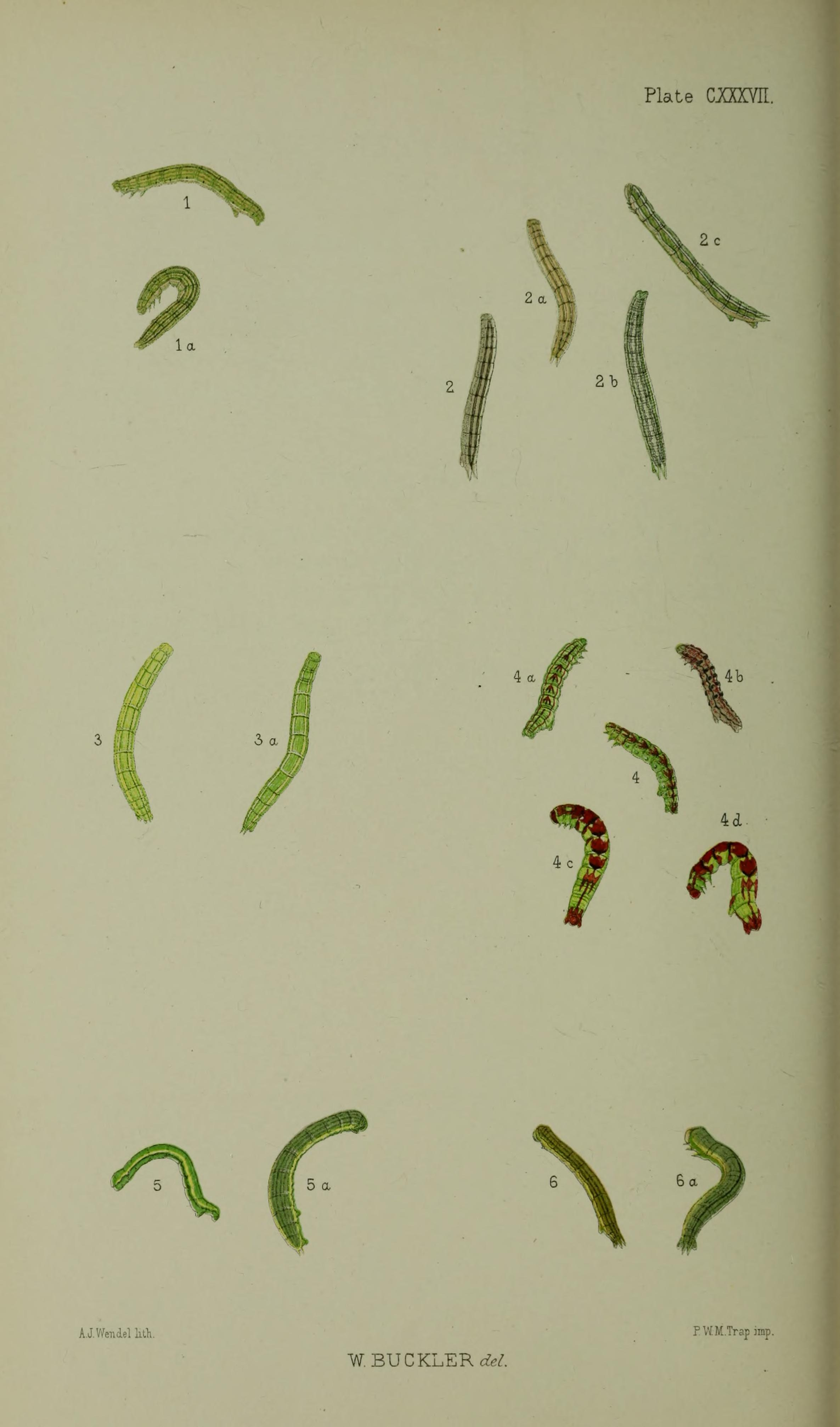
Figs 6,6a larvae after final moult

== Biology ==
The larvae feed on Ligustrum vulgare and Fraxinus species. The pupa is placed in a moderately compact cocoon on the surface of the earth Adults are on wing from March to April.

== Subspecies ==
- Trichopteryx polycommata polycommata
- Trichopteryx polycommata grisea (Djakonov, 1926) (northern Urals, Altai, Sayan, north-eastern Kazakhstan, Kamchatka)
- Trichopteryx polycommata anna Inoue, 1957

Furthermore, there are a number of named forms, including the melanic form, ab. caliginosa, which has been recorded Sussex.
