= Sauris lineosa =

Scientific classification
- Kingdom: Animalia
- Phylum: Arthropoda
- Class: Insecta
- Order: Lepidoptera
- Family: Geometridae
- Genus: Sauris
- Species: S. lineosa

Binomial name
- Sauris lineosa Moore, 1888

Species of moth

Sauris lineosa is a moth of the family Geometridae first described by Frederic Moore in 1888. It is found in India and Sri Lanka.
