= Sauris nigripalpata =

Scientific classification
- Kingdom: Animalia
- Phylum: Arthropoda
- Class: Insecta
- Order: Lepidoptera
- Family: Geometridae
- Genus: Sauris
- Species: S. nigripalpata

Binomial name
- Sauris nigripalpata Walker, 1862

Species of moth

Sauris nigripalpata is a moth of the family Geometridae first described by Francis Walker in 1862. It is found in Sri Lanka.
