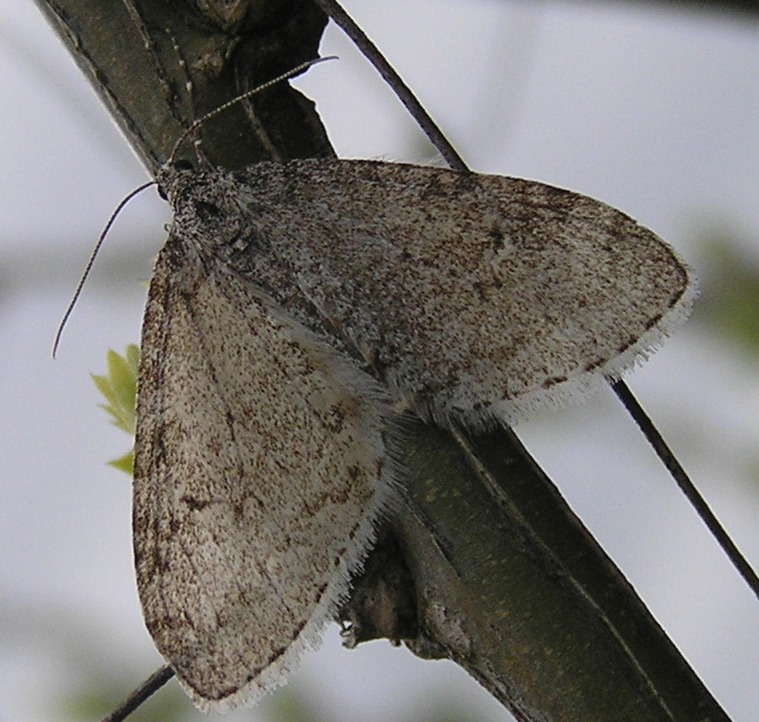
- Trichopteryx carpinata

Scientific classification
- Domain: Eukaryota
- Kingdom: Animalia
- Phylum: Arthropoda
- Class: Insecta
- Order: Lepidoptera
- Family: Geometridae
- Subfamily: Larentiinae
- Tribe: Trichopterygini; Warren, 1894

= Trichopterygini =

Tribe of moths

Trichopterygini is a tribe of geometer moths under subfamily Larentiinae. The tribe was described by Warren in 1894.

== Recognized genera ==
- Acasis Duponschel, 1845
- Brabira Moore, 1888
- Carige Walker, 1862
- Celonoptera Lederer, 1862
- Cladara Hulst, 1896
- Epilobophora Inoue, 1943
- Episauris Rebel, 1898
- Episteira Warren, 1899
- Esakiopteryx Inoue, 1958
- Heterophleps Herrich-Schäffer, [1854]
- Leptostegna Christoph, 1881
- Lobophora Curtis, 1825
- Nothocasis Prout, 1936
- Ortholithoidia Wehrli, 1932
- Oulobophora Staudinger, 1892
- Pterapherapteryx Curtis, 1825
- Ptygmatophora Gumppenberg, 1887
- Sauris Guenée, 1857
- Tatosoma Butler, 1874
- Trichopteryx Hübner, [1825]
- Tyloptera Christoph, 1881
- Tympanota Warren, 1895
