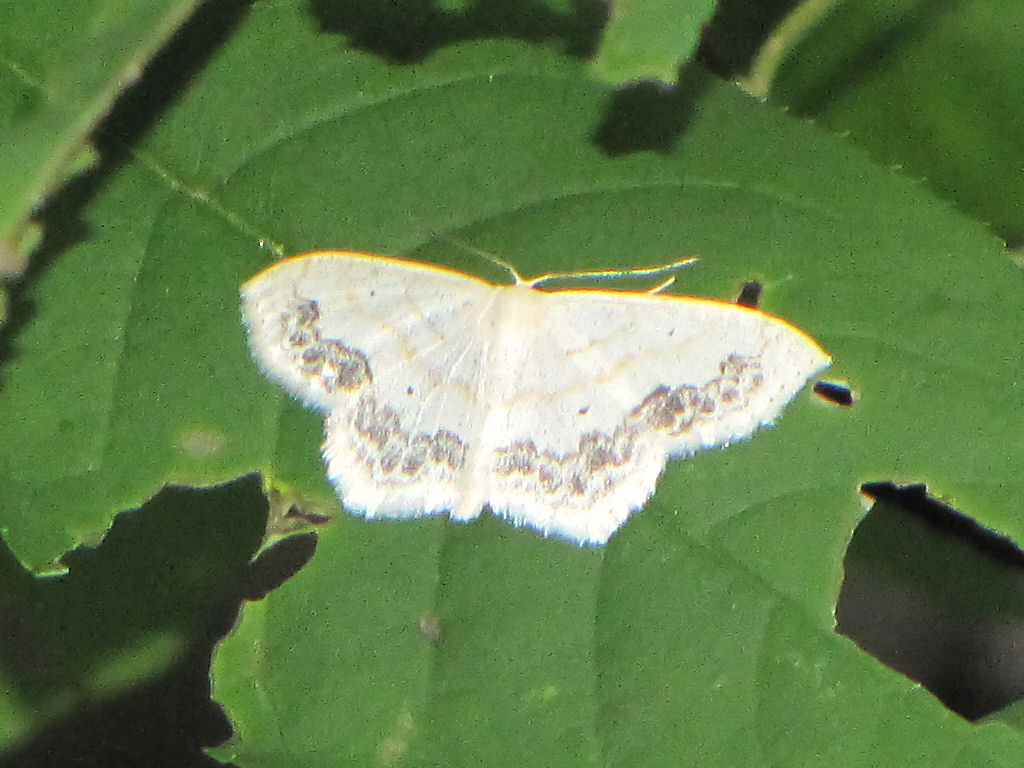
- Large lace-border moth (S. limboundata), Gatineau Park, Quebec

Scientific classification
- Kingdom: Animalia
- Phylum: Arthropoda
- Class: Insecta
- Order: Lepidoptera
- Family: Geometridae
- Tribe: Scopulini
- Genus: Scopula; Schrank, 1802

Synonyms
- Acidalia Bruand, 1846; Acidalia Treitschke, 1825; Acidalina Staudinger, 1898; Aletis Hübner, [1820]; Anacosymbia Prout, 1913; Antanepsia Turner, 1908; Antilycauges Prout, 1913; Antitrygodes Warren, 1895; Autanepsia Turner, 1908; Calothysanis Hübner, 1823; Cartaletis Warren, 1894; Chlorocraspedia Warren, 1899; Cinglis Guenée, [1858]; Craspedia Hübner, 1826; Csopula Fischer von Röslerstamm, 1842; Cymatida Sodoffsky, 1837; Cymatoides Zeller, 1846; Dasybela Turner, 1908; Dasybella Turner, 1908; Dosithea Duponchel, 1829; Dosithoea Rambur, 1833; Epicosymbia Warren, 1897; Eucidalia Sterneck, 1941; Glossotrophia Prout, 1913; Holarctias Prout, 1913; Ignobilia Prout, 1932; Induna Warren, 1897; Isoplenia Warren, 1897; Leptaletis Warren, 1894; Leptomeris Hübner, 1826; Lipocentris Warren, 1905; Longula Staudinger, 1892; Leucoxena Warren, 1900; Lycauges Butler, 1879; Oar Prout, 1913; Phyletis Guenée, 1897; Pigia Guenée, [1858]; Pleionocentra Warren, 1898; Prasonesis Meyrick, 1889; Pseudocinglis Hausmann, 1994; Psilephyra Bastelberger, 1909; Pylarge Herrich-Schäffer, 1856; Runeca Moore, 1888; Sarodria Sodoffsky, 1837; Sarothria Agassiz, 1847; Scopuloides Hausmann, 1994; Sphecodes Hübner, 1822 (preocc. Sphecodes Latreille, 1804); Stigma Alphéraky, 1883; Synelys Hulst, 1896; Trichoclada Meyrick, 1886; Triorisma Warren, 1897; Ustocidalia Sterneck, 1932; Zygophyxia Prout, 1916; Microglossotrophia Hausmann, 1993; Bicalcarella Hausmann, 1993; Parenzanella Hausmann, 1993

= Scopula =

Genus of geometer moths in subfamily Sterrhinae

Scopula is a genus of moths in the family Geometridae described by Franz von Paula Schrank in 1802.

== Species ==
It has 705 species which are listed here alphabetically.

=== A ===
- Scopula ablativa (Dognin, 1911)
- Scopula abolita Herbulot, [1956]
- Scopula abornata (Guenée, [1858])
- Scopula accentuata (Guenée, [1858])
- Scopula acentra (Warren, 1897)
- Scopula acharis Prout, 1938
- Scopula achroa (Lower, 1902)
- Scopula achrosta Prout, 1935
- Scopula acidalia (Holland, 1894)
- Scopula acinosa (Prout, 1932)
- Scopula actuaria (Walker, 1861)
- Scopula acutanellus Herbulot, 1992
- Scopula acyma Prout, 1932
- Scopula addictaria (Walker, 1861)
- Scopula adelpharia (Püngeler, 1894)
- Scopula adenensis (Wiltshire, 1986)
- Scopula adeptaria (Walker, 1861)
- Scopula aegrefasciata Sihvonen, 2001
- Scopula aemulata (Hulst, 1896) – angled wave
- Scopula aequidistans (Warren, 1896)
- Scopula aequifasciata (Christoph, 1881)
- Scopula aetheomorpha Prout, 1917
- Scopula afghana (Ebert, 1965)
- Scopula africana Berio, 1937
- Scopula agglomerata Herbulot, 1992
- Scopula agnes (Butler, 1886)
- Scopula agrapta (Warren, 1902)
- Scopula agrata (Felder & Rogenhofer, 1875)
- Scopula agutsaensis Vasilenko, 1997
- Scopula alargata (Dognin, 1901)
- Scopula alba (Hausmann, 1993)
- Scopula albiceraria (Herrich-Schäffer, 1847)
- Scopula albida (Warren, 1899)
- Scopula albidaria (Staudinger, 1901)
- Scopula albidulata (Warren, 1897)
- Scopula albiflava (Warren, 1896)
- Scopula albilarvata (Warren, 1899)
- Scopula albivertex (Swinhoe, 1892)
- Scopula albomaculata (Moore, 1888)
- Scopula alboverticata (Warren, 1895)
- Scopula aleuritis (Turner, 1908)
- Scopula alfierii (Wiltshire, 1949)
- Scopula alma Prout, 1920
- Scopula alstoni Prout, 1919
- Scopula amala (Meyrick, 1886)
- Scopula amazonata (Guenée, [1858])
- Scopula ambigua Prout, 1935
- Scopula amphiphracta Prout, 1938
- Scopula amseli Wiltshire, 1967
- Scopula anaitisaria (Walker, 1861)
- Scopula anatreces Prout, 1920
- Scopula ancellata (Hulst, 1887)
- Scopula andalusiaria (Wagner, 1935)
- Scopula andresi (Draudt, 1912)
- Scopula anfractata Sihvonen, 2005
- Scopula angusticallis Prout, 1935
- Scopula aniara Prout, 1934
- Scopula anisopleura Inoue, 1982
- Scopula annexata Prout, 1938
- Scopula annubiata (Staudinger, 1892)
- Scopula annularia (Swinhoe, 1890)
- Scopula anoista (Prout, 1915)
- Scopula ansorgei (Warren, 1899)
- Scopula ansulata (Lederer, 1871)
- Scopula antankarana Herbulot, [1956]
- Scopula antiloparia (Wallengren, 1863)
- Scopula anysima Prout, 1938
- Scopula aphercta Prout, 1932
- Scopula apicipunctata (Christoph, 1881)
- Scopula apparitaria (Walker, 1861)
- Scopula arenosaria (Staudinger, 1879)
- Scopula argentidisca (Warren, 1902)
- Scopula argillina (Lower, 1915)
- Scopula argyroleuca (Hampson, 1910)
- Scopula asellaria (Herrich-Schäffer, 1847)
- Scopula asiatica (Brandt, 1938)
- Scopula asopiata (Guenée, [1858])
- Scopula asparta Prout, 1938
- Scopula aspiciens Prout, 1926
- Scopula aspilataria (Walker, 1861)
- Scopula asthena Inoue, 1943
- Scopula astheniata Viidalepp, 2005
- Scopula astrabes Prout, 1932
- Scopula asymmetrica Holloway, 1997
- Scopula atramentaria (Bastelberger, 1909)
- Scopula atricapilla Prout, 1934
- Scopula atriceps (Hampson, 1895)
- Scopula atridiscata (Warren, 1897)
- Scopula attentata (Walker, 1861)
- Scopula axiata (Püngeler, 1909)
- Scopula axiotis (Meyrick, 1888)

=== B ===
- Scopula batesi Prout, 1932
- Scopula beccarii (Prout, 1915)
- Scopula beckeraria (Lederer, 1853)
- Scopula benenotata Prout, 1932
- Scopula benguetensis Prout, 1931
- Scopula benigna (Brandt, 1941)
- Scopula benitaria (Barnes & McDunnough, 1913)
- Scopula bifalsaria (Prout, 1913)
- Scopula bigeminata (Warren, 1897)
- Scopula bimacularia (Leech, 1897)
- Scopula bispurcata (Warren, 1898)
- Scopula bistrigata (Pagenstecher, 1907)
- Scopula brachypus Prout, 1926
- Scopula brookesae Holloway, 1976
- Scopula bullata (Vojnits, 1986)
- Scopula butleri (Prout, 1913)
- Scopula butyrosa (Warren, 1893)

=== C ===
- Scopula caberaria Herbulot, 1992
- Scopula cacuminaria (Morrison, 1874) – frosted tan wave
- Scopula caducaria (Swinhoe, 1904)
- Scopula caeria Prout, 1938
- Scopula caesaria (Walker, 1861)
- Scopula cajanderi (Herz, 1903)
- Scopula calcarata D. S. Fletcher, 1958
- Scopula caledonica Holloway, 1979
- Scopula callibotrys (Prout, 1918)
- Scopula calothysanis Herbulot, 1965
- Scopula calotis (Dyar, 1912)
- Scopula campbelli Prout, 1920
- Scopula candida Prout, 1934
- Scopula candidaria (Warren, 1902)
- Scopula canularia (Herrich-Schäffer, 1870)
- Scopula capnosterna Prout, 1938
- Scopula caricaria (Reutti, 1853)
- Scopula carnosa Prout, 1925
- Scopula cassiaria (Swinhoe, 1904)
- Scopula cassioides Prout, 1932
- Scopula castissima (Warren, 1897)
- Scopula cavana (Druce, 1892)
- Scopula celebraria (Walker, 1861)
- Scopula cervinata (Warren, 1905)
- Scopula cesa Kemal & Kocak, 2004
- Scopula chalcographata (Brandt, 1938)
- Scopula chionaeata (Herrich-Schäffer, 1870)
- Scopula chrysoparalias (Prout, 1917)
- Scopula chydaea Prout, 1938
- Scopula cineraria (Leech, 1897)
- Scopula cinnamomata D. S. Fletcher, 1955
- Scopula circumpunctata (Warren, 1898)
- Scopula clandestina Herbulot, [1956]
- Scopula clarivialis Prout, 1931
- Scopula cleoraria (Walker, 1861)
- Scopula coangulata Prout, 1920
- Scopula coenona (Turner, 1908)
- Scopula colymbas Herbulot, 1994
- Scopula comes Prout, 1927
- Scopula commaria (Swinhoe, 1904)
- Scopula compensata (Walker, 1861)
- Scopula complanata (Warren, 1896)
- Scopula concinnaria (Duponchel, 1842)
- Scopula concolor (Warren, 1905)
- Scopula concurrens (Warren, 1897)
- Scopula conduplicata (Warren, 1904)
- Scopula confertaria (Walker, 1861)
- Scopula confinaria (Herrich-Schäffer, 1847)
- Scopula confusa (Butler, 1878)
- Scopula congruata (Zeller, 1847)
- Scopula coniargyris Prout, 1932
- Scopula coniaria (Prout, 1913)
- Scopula conotaria (Schaus, 1901)
- Scopula conscensa (Swinhoe, 1886)
- Scopula consimilata (Warren, 1896)
- Scopula conspersa (Warren, 1900)
- Scopula conspicillaria Karisch, 2001
- Scopula contramutata Prout, 1920
- Scopula convergens (Warren, 1904)
- Scopula convictorata (Snellen, 1874)
- Scopula cornishi Prout, 1932
- Scopula corrivalaria (Kretschmar, 1862)
- Scopula corrupta Prout, 1931
- Scopula costata (Moore, [1887])
- Scopula coundularia (Warren, 1898)
- Scopula crassipuncta (Warren, 1901)
- Scopula crawshayi Prout, 1932
- Scopula cumulata (Alphéraky, 1883)
- Scopula cuneilinea (Walker, [1863])
- Scopula curvimargo (Warren, 1900)

=== D ===
- Scopula dapharia (Swinhoe, 1904)
- Scopula dargei Herbulot, 1992
- Scopula declinata Herbulot, 1972
- Scopula decolor (Staudinger, 1898)
- Scopula decorata ([Denis & Schiffermüller], 1775)
- Scopula defectiscripta (Prout, 1914)
- Scopula defixaria (Walker, 1861)
- Scopula deflavaria (Warren, 1896)
- Scopula deflavarioides Holloway, 1997
- Scopula dehortata (Dognin, 1901)
- Scopula deiliniata (Warren, 1897)
- Scopula deliciosaria (Walker, 1861)
- Scopula delitata (Prout, 1913)
- Scopula delospila (Warren, 1907)
- Scopula demissaria (Walker, [1863])
- Scopula densicornis (Warren, 1897)
- Scopula dentilinea (Warren, 1897)
- Scopula dentisignata (Walker, [1863])
- Scopula derasata (Walker, [1863])
- Scopula deserta (Warren, 1897)
- Scopula desita (Walker, 1861)
- Scopula despoliata (Walker, 1861)
- Scopula destituta (Walker, 1866)
- Scopula detentata Prout, 1926
- Scopula dhofarata Wiltshire, 1986
- Scopula didymosema (Lower, 1893)
- Scopula diffinaria (Prout, 1913)
- Scopula dignata (Guenée, [1858])
- Scopula dimoera Prout, 1922
- Scopula dimoeroides Herbulot, [1956]
- Scopula dimorphata (Snellen, 1881)
- Scopula disclusaria (Christoph, 1881)
- Scopula discrepans Prout, 1916
- Scopula dismutata (Guenée, [1858])
- Scopula disparata (Hampson, 1903)
- Scopula dissonans (Warren, 1897)
- Scopula divisaria (Walker, 1861)
- Scopula dohertyi (Warren, 1897)
- Scopula donaria (Schaus, 1901)
- Scopula donovani (Distant, 1892)
- Scopula dorsinigrata (Warren, 1904)
- Scopula dotina Prout, 1938
- Scopula drenowskii Sterneck, 1941
- Scopula dubernardi (Oberthür 1923)
- Scopula duplicipuncta (Prout, 1913)
- Scopula duplinupta Inoue, 1982
- Scopula dux Prout, 1927
- Scopula dysmorpha (Prout, 1915)

=== E ===
- Scopula eburneata (Guenée, [1858])
- Scopula eclipes (Prout, 1910)
- Scopula ectopostigma Prout, 1932
- Scopula elegans (Prout, 1915)
- Scopula elegantula Herbulot, 1978
- Scopula eleina Prout, 1938
- Scopula elisabethae Prout, 1934
- Scopula elwesi Prout, 1922
- Scopula emissaria (Walker, 1861)
- Scopula emutaria (Hübner, [1809])
- Scopula emma (Prout 1913)
- Scopula enucloides (Schaus, 1901)
- Scopula epigypsa (Meyrick, 1886)
- Scopula epiorrhoe Prout, 1935
- Scopula episcia (Meyrick, 1888)
- Scopula episticta Turner, 1942
- Scopula erebospila (Lower, 1902)
- Scopula erici (Kirby, 1896)
- Scopula erinaria (Swinhoe, 1904)
- Scopula erlangeri (Prout, 1932)
- Scopula erubescens (Warren, 1895)
- Scopula erymna Prout, 1928
- Scopula euchroa Prout, 1925
- Scopula eulomata (Snellen, 1877)
- Scopula eunupta Vasilenko, 1998
- Scopula euphemia Prout, 1920
- Scopula eurata (Prout, 1913)
- Scopula extimaria (Walker, 1861)

=== F ===
- Scopula falcataria (Warren, 1901)
- Scopula falcovitshi Viidalepp, 1992
- Scopula falsaria (Herrich-Schäffer, 1852)
- Scopula farinaria (Leech, 1897)
- Scopula fernaria Schaus, 1940
- Scopula ferrilineata (Moore, 1888)
- Scopula ferruginea (Hampson, 1893)
- Scopula fibulata (Guenée, [1858])
- Scopula fimbrilineata (Warren, 1902)
- Scopula flaccata (Staudinger, 1898)
- Scopula flaccidaria (Zeller, 1852)
- Scopula flavifurfurata Prout, 1920
- Scopula flavinsolata Holloway, 1997
- Scopula flavissima (Warren, 1898)
- Scopula flavorosearia (Shchetkin, 1956)
- Scopula flexio Prout, 1917
- Scopula floslactata (Haworth, 1809)
- Scopula fluidaria (Swinhoe, 1886)
- Scopula forbesi (Druce, 1884)
- Scopula formosana Prout, 1934
- Scopula fragilis (Warren, 1903)
- Scopula francki Prout, 1935
- Scopula frigidaria (Möschler, 1860)
- Scopula froitzheimi Wiltshire, 1967
- Scopula fucata (Püngeler, 1909)
- Scopula fulminataria (Turati, 1927)
- Scopula fulvicolor Hampson, 1899
- Scopula fumosaria (Prout, 1913)
- Scopula furfurata (Warren, 1897)
- Scopula fuscata (Hulst, 1887)
- Scopula fuscescens Prout, 1934
- Scopula fuscobrunnea (Warren, 1901)

=== G ===
- Scopula galactina D. S. Fletcher, 1978
- Scopula gastonaria (Oberthür, 1876)
- Scopula gazellaria (Wallengren, 1863)
- Scopula gibbivalvata Herbulot, 1972
- Scopula gilva Sato, 1993
- Scopula glaucescens Herbulot, 1978
- Scopula gnou Herbulot, 1985
- Scopula gracilis (Brandt, 1941)
- Scopula graphidata Prout, 1920
- Scopula grasuta (Schaus, 1901)
- Scopula griseolineata (Rothschild, 1915)
- Scopula grisescens (Staudinger, 1892)
- Scopula guancharia (Alphéraky, 1889)

=== H ===
- Scopula habilis (Warren, 1899)
- Scopula hackeri Hausmann, 1999
- Scopula haemaleata (Warren, 1898)
- Scopula haematophaga Bänziger & Fletcher, 1985
- Scopula haeretica Herbulot, [1956]
- Scopula halimodendrata (Erschoff, 1874)
- Scopula hanna (Butler, 1878)
- Scopula harteni Hausmann, 2009
- Scopula heba Prout, 1920
- Scopula hectata (Guenée, [1858])
- Scopula heidra Debauche, 1938
- Scopula helcita (Linnaeus, 1763)
- Scopula herbuloti Karisch, 2001
- Scopula herbuloti (Viette, 1977)
- Scopula hesycha Prout, 1919
- Scopula hoerhammeri Brandt, 1941
- Scopula homaema Prout, 1920
- Scopula homodoxa (Meyrick, 1886)
- Scopula honestata (Mabille, 1869)
- Scopula horiochroea (Prout, 1916)
- Scopula humifusaria (Eversmann, 1837)
- Scopula humilis (Prout, 1913)
- Scopula hyphenophora (Warren, 1896)
- Scopula hypocallista (Lower, 1900)
- Scopula hypochra (Meyrick, 1888)

=== I ===
- Scopula ichinosawana (Matsumura, 1925)
- Scopula idearia (Swinhoe, 1886)
- Scopula idnothogramma Prout, 1938
- Scopula ignobilis (Warren, 1901)
- Scopula imitaria (Hübner, [1799])
- Scopula immistaria (Herrich-Schäffer, 1852)
- Scopula immorata (Linnaeus, 1758)
- Scopula immutata (Linnaeus, 1758)
- Scopula impersonata (Walker, 1861)
- Scopula impicta Prout, 1922
- Scopula improba (Warren, 1899)
- Scopula impropriaria (Walker, 1861)
- Scopula inactuosa Prout, 1920
- Scopula inangulata (Warren, 1896)
- Scopula incalcarata D. S. Fletcher, 1958
- Scopula incanata (Linnaeus, 1758)
- Scopula indicataria (Walker, 1861)
- Scopula inductata (Guenée, [1858]) – soft-lined wave
- Scopula infantilis Herbulot, 1970
- Scopula inficita (Walker, 1866)
- Scopula inflexibilis Prout, 1931
- Scopula infota (Warren, 1897)
- Scopula innocens (Butler, 1886)
- Scopula innominata Schaus, 1940
- Scopula inscriptata (Walker, [1863])
- Scopula insincera Prout, 1920
- Scopula instructata (Walker, 1863)
- Scopula intensata (Moore, 1887)
- Scopula internata (Guenée, [1858])
- Scopula internataria (Walker, 1861)
- Scopula iranaria Bytinski-Salz & Brandt, 1937
- Scopula irrorata (Bethune-Baker, 1891)
- Scopula irrubescens Prout, 1934
- Scopula irrufata (Warren, 1905)
- Scopula isodesma (Lower, 1903)
- Scopula isomala Prout, 1932
- Scopula isomerica Prout, 1922
- Scopula iterata Herbulot, 1978

=== J-K ===
- Scopula jacta (Swinhoe, 1885)
- Scopula jejuna Prout, 1932
- Scopula johnsoni D. S. Fletcher, 1958
- Scopula julietae Robinson, 1975
- Scopula junctaria (Walker, 1861) – simple wave
- Scopula juruana (Butler, 1881)
- Scopula kagiata (Bastelberger, 1909)
- Scopula karischi Herbulot, 1999
- Scopula kashmirensis (Moore, 1888)
- Scopula kawabei Inoue, 1982
- Scopula klaphecki Prout, 1922
- Scopula kohor Herbulot & Viette, 1952
- Scopula kounden Herbulot, 1992
- Scopula kuhitangica Vasilenko, 1998
- Scopula kuldschaensis (Alphéraky, 1883)

=== L ===
- Scopula lacriphaga Bänziger & Fletcher, 1985
- Scopula lactaria (Walker, 1861)
- Scopula lactarioides Brandt, 1941
- Scopula lactea (Warren, 1900)
- Scopula laevipennis (Warren, 1897)
- Scopula laresaria Schaus, 1940
- Scopula larseni (Wiltshire, 1982)
- Scopula latelineata (Graeser, 1892)
- Scopula lathraea Prout, 1922
- Scopula latifera (Walker, 1869)
- Scopula latimediata D. S. Fletcher, 1958
- Scopula latitans Prout, 1920
- Scopula lautaria (Hübner, [1831]) – small frosted wave
- Scopula lechrioloma (Turner, 1908)
- Scopula legrandi Herbulot, [1963]
- Scopula lehmanni Hausmann, 1991
- Scopula leucoloma Prout, 1932
- Scopula leucopis Prout, 1926
- Scopula leuculata (Snellen, 1874)
- Scopula leuraria (Prout, 1913)
- Scopula libyssa (Hopffer, 1858)
- Scopula limbata (Wileman, 1915)
- Scopula limboundata (Haworth, 1809) – large lace-border
- Scopula limosata D. S. Fletcher, 1963
- Scopula linearia (Hampson, 1891)
- Scopula liotis (Meyrick, 1888)
- Scopula longicerata Inoue, 1955
- Scopula longitarsata Prout, 1932
- Scopula loxographa Turner, 1941
- Scopula loxosema (Turner, 1908)
- Scopula lubricata (Warren, 1905)
- Scopula ludibunda (Prout, 1915)
- Scopula lugubriata D. S. Fletcher, 1958
- Scopula luridata (Zeller, 1847)
- Scopula lutearia (Leech, 1897)
- Scopula luteicollis Prout, 1938
- Scopula luteolata (Hulst, 1880)
- Scopula luxipuncta Prout, 1932
- Scopula lydia (Butler, 1886)

=== M ===
- Scopula macrocelis (Prout, 1915)
- Scopula macronephes D. S. Fletcher, 1958
- Scopula magnidiscata (Warren, 1904)
- Scopula magnipunctata D. S. Fletcher, 1958
- Scopula malagasy (Viette, 1977)
- Scopula malayana Bänziger & Fletcher, 1985
- Scopula manengouba Herbulot, 1992
- Scopula manes Djakonov, 1936
- Scopula manifesta (Prout 1911)
- Scopula mappata (Guenée, [1858])
- Scopula marcidaria (Leech, 1897)
- Scopula margaritaria (Warren, 1900)
- Scopula marginepunctata (Goeze, 1781)
- Scopula mariarosae (Expósito, 2006)
- Scopula mascula (Bastelberger, 1909)
- Scopula mecysma (Swinhoe, 1894)
- Scopula megalocentra (Meyrick, 1888)
- Scopula megalostigma (Prout, 1915)
- Scopula melanopis (Prout, 1929)
- Scopula melanstigma Prout, 1938
- Scopula melinau Holloway, 1997
- Scopula mendax Herbulot, 1954
- Scopula mendicaria (Leech, 1897)
- Scopula mentzeri (Hausmann, 1993)
- Scopula menytes Prout, 1935
- Scopula merina Herbulot, [1956]
- Scopula mesophaena Prout, 1923
- Scopula metacosmia Prout, 1932
- Scopula micara (Schaus, 1901)
- Scopula michinoku Sato, 1994
- Scopula micrata (Guenée, [1858])
- Scopula microphylla (Meyrick, 1889)
- Scopula minoa (Prout, 1916)
- Scopula minorata (Boisduval, 1833)
- Scopula minuta (Warren, 1900)
- Scopula misera (Walker, 1866)
- Scopula mishmica Prout, 1938
- Scopula modesta (Moore, [1887])
- Scopula modicaria (Leech, 1897)
- Scopula moinieri Herbulot, 1966
- Scopula molaris Prout, 1922
- Scopula mollicula Prout, 1932
- Scopula monosema Prout, 1923
- Scopula monotropa Prout, 1925
- Scopula montivaga Prout, 1922
- Scopula moorei (Cotes & Swinhoe, 1888)
- Scopula moralesi (Rungs, 1945)
- Scopula mustangensis Yazaki, 1995

=== N ===
- Scopula nacida (Dognin, 1901)
- Scopula napariata (Guenée, [1858])
- Scopula natalensis (Prout, 1915)
- Scopula natalica (Butler, 1875)
- Scopula nebulata D. S. Fletcher, 1963
- Scopula nemoraria (Hübner, [1799])
- Scopula nemorivagata Wallengren, 1863
- Scopula neophyta Prout, 1922
- Scopula neoxesta (Meyrick, 1888)
- Scopula nepalensis Inoue, 1982
- Scopula nepheloperas (Prout, 1916)
- Scopula nephotropa Prout, 1931
- Scopula nesciaria (Walker, 1861)
- Scopula nesciaroides Holloway, 1997
- Scopula nigralba Herbulot, 1978
- Scopula nigricornis Herbulot, 1992
- Scopula nigricosta (Prout, 1916)
- Scopula nigridentata (Warren, 1896)
- Scopula nigrifrons Pajni & Walia
- Scopula nigrinotata (Warren, 1897)
- Scopula nigristellata (Warren, 1898)
- Scopula nigrocellata (Warren, 1899)
- Scopula nigrociliata Ebert, 1965
- Scopula nigropunctata (Hufnagel, 1767)
- Scopula nipha D. S. Fletcher, 1955
- Scopula nitidata (Warren, 1905)
- Scopula nitidissima Prout, 1920
- Scopula nivearia (Leech, 1897)
- Scopula normalis Herbulot, [1956]
- Scopula nostima Prout, 1938
- Scopula nubifera Hausmann, 1998
- Scopula nucleata (Warren, 1905)
- Scopula nupta (Butler, 1878)

=== O ===
- Scopula obliquifascia Herbulot, 1999
- Scopula obliquiscripta (Warren, 1897)
- Scopula obliquisignata (Bastelberger, 1909)
- Scopula obliviaria (Walker, 1861)
- Scopula ocellata (Warren, 1899)*
- Scopula ocellicincta (Warren, 1901)
- Scopula ocheracea (Hampson, 1891)
- Scopula ochraceata (Staudinger, 1901)
- Scopula ochrea (Hausmann, 2006)
- Scopula ochreofusa (Warren, 1899)
- Scopula ochreolata (Warren, 1905)
- Scopula ochricrinita Prout, 1920
- Scopula ochrifrons Prout, 1920
- Scopula oenoloma Prout, 1932
- Scopula oliveta Prout, 1920
- Scopula omana Wilthsire, 1977
- Scopula omissa (Warren, 1906)
- Scopula omnisona Prout, 1915
- Scopula ophthalmica Prout, 1920
- Scopula opicata (Fabricius, 1798)
- Scopula opperta Prout, 1920
- Scopula oppilata (Walker, 1861)
- Scopula oppunctata (Warren, 1902)
- Scopula optivata (Walker, 1861)
- Scopula orbeorum (Hausmann, 1996)
- Scopula ordinaria (Dyar, 1912)
- Scopula ordinata (Walker, 1861)
- Scopula orientalis (Alphéraky, 1876)
- Scopula origalis (Brandt, 1941)
- Scopula ornata (Scopoli, 1763)
- Scopula orthoscia (Meyrick, 1888)
- Scopula oryx Herbulot, 1985
- Scopula ossicolor (Warren, 1897)
- Scopula ourebi Herbulot, 1985
- Scopula oxysticha Prout, 1938
- Scopula oxystoma Prout, 1929

=== P-Q ===
- Scopula paetula Prout, 1919
- Scopula palleuca Prout, 1925
- Scopula pallida (Warren, 1888)
- Scopula pallidiceps (Warren, 1898)
- Scopula pallidilinea (Warren, 1897)
- Scopula palpata (Prout, 1932)
- Scopula palpifera Prout, 1925
- Scopula paneliusi Herbulot, 1957
- Scopula paradela Prout, 1920
- Scopula paradelpharia Prout, 1920
- Scopula parallelaria (Warren, 1901)
- Scopula parodites Prout, 1931
- Scopula parvimacula (Warren, 1896)
- Scopula patularia (Walker, 1866)
- Scopula pauperata (Walker, 1861)
- Scopula pedilata (Felder & Rogenhofer, 1875)
- Scopula pelloniodes Prout, 1922
- Scopula penricei Prout, 1920
- Scopula penultima Herbulot, 1992
- Scopula peractaria (Walker, 1866)
- Scopula perialurga (Turner, 1922)
- Scopula perlata (Walker, 1861)
- Scopula perlimbata (Snellen, 1874)
- Scopula permutata (Staudinger, 1897)
- Scopula perornata (Thierry-Mieg, 1905)
- Scopula perpunctata Herbulot, 1992
- Scopula personata (Prout, 1913)
- Scopula perstrigulata (Prout, 1913)
- Scopula pertinax (Prout, 1916)
- Scopula phallarcuata Holloway, 1997
- Scopula phyletis (Prout, 1913)
- Scopula phyxelis Prout, 1938
- Scopula picta (Warren, 1897)
- Scopula pinguis (Swinhoe, 1902)
- Scopula pirimacula (Prout, 1916)
- Scopula pithogona Prout, 1938*
- Scopula placida (Warren, 1905)
- Scopula planidisca (Bastelberger, 1908)
- Scopula planipennis (Warren, 1900)
- Scopula plantagenaria (Hulst, 1887)
- Scopula plionocentra Prout, 1920
- Scopula plumbearia (Leech, 1891)
- Scopula poliodesma (Turner, 1908)
- Scopula polystigmaria (Hampson, 1903)
- Scopula polyterpes Prout, 1920
- Scopula praecanata (Staudinger, 1896)
- Scopula praesignipuncta Prout, 1920
- Scopula pratana (Fabricius, 1794)
- Scopula preumenes Prout, 1938
- Scopula prisca Herbulot, [1956]
- Scopula privata (Walker, 1861)
- Scopula promethes Prout, 1928
- Scopula propinquaria (Leech, 1897)
- Scopula prosoeca (Turner, 1908)
- Scopula prosthiostigma Prout, 1938
- Scopula protecta Herbulot, [1956]
- Scopula proterocelis Prout, 1920
- Scopula prouti Djakonov, 1935
- Scopula proximaria (Leech, 1897)
- Scopula pruinata D. S. Fletcher, 1958
- Scopula psephis Prout, 1935
- Scopula pseudagrata Holloway, 1997
- Scopula pseudoafghana Ebert, 1965
- Scopula pseudocorrivalaria (Wehrli, 1932)
- Scopula pseudodoxa Prout, 1920
- Scopula pseudophema Prout, 1920
- Scopula pudicaria (Motschulsky, [1861])
- Scopula puerca (Dognin, 1901)
- Scopula pulchellata (Fabricius, 1794)
- Scopula pulverosa Prout, 1934
- Scopula punctatissima (Bastelberger, 1911)
- Scopula puncticosta (Walker, 1869)
- Scopula punctilineata (Warren, 1897)
- Scopula purata (Guenée, [1858]) – chalky wave
- Scopula pyraliata (Warren, 1898)
- Scopula pyrrhochra (Prout, 1916)
- Scopula quadratisparsa Holloway, 1976
- Scopula quadrifasciata (Bastelberger, 1909)
- Scopula quadrilineata (Packard, 1876) – four-lined wave
- Scopula quinquefasciata Holloway, 1979
- Scopula quinquestriata (Warren, 1896)
- Scopula quintaria (Prout, 1916)

=== R ===
- Scopula radiata (Warren, 1897)
- Scopula rantaizanensis (Wileman, 1915)
- Scopula reaumuraria (Milliere, 1864)
- Scopula rebaptisa Herbulot, 1985
- Scopula rectisecta Prout, 1920
- Scopula recurvata Herbulot, 1992
- Scopula recurvinota (Warren, 1902)
- Scopula recusataria (Walker, 1861)
- Scopula regenerata (Fabricius, 1794)
- Scopula relictata (Walker, 1866)
- Scopula remotata (Guenée, [1858])
- Scopula restricta Holloway, 1997
- Scopula retracta (Hausmann, 2006)
- Scopula rhodinaria (Rebel, 1907)
- Scopula rhodocraspeda Prout, 1932
- Scopula riedeli Hausmann, 2006
- Scopula risa Wiltshire, 1982
- Scopula rivularia (Leech, 1897)
- Scopula roezaria (Swinhoe, 1904)
- Scopula romanarioides (Rothschild, 1913)
- Scopula roseocincta (Warren, 1899)
- Scopula rossi (Prout, 1913)
- Scopula rostrilinea (Warren, 1900)
- Scopula rubellata (Staudinger, 1871)
- Scopula rubiginata (Hufnagel, 1767)
- Scopula rubraria (Doubleday, 1843)
- Scopula rubriceps (Warren, 1905)
- Scopula rubrocinctata (Guenée, [1858])
- Scopula rubrosignaria (Mabille, 1900)
- Scopula ruficolor Prout, 1916
- Scopula rufigrisea Prout, 1913
- Scopula rufisalsa (Warren, 1897)
- Scopula rufistigma (Warren, 1895)
- Scopula rufolutaria (Mabille, 1900)
- Scopula rufomixtaria (Graslin, 1863)
- Scopula rufotinctata (Prout, 1913)

=== S ===
- Scopula sacraria (Bang-Haas, 1910)
- Scopula sagittilinea (Warren, 1897)
- Scopula sanguinifissa Herbulot, [1956]
- Scopula sanguinisecta (Warren, 1897)
- Scopula saphes Prout, 1920
- Scopula sapor (Druce, 1910)
- Scopula sarcodes Prout, 1935
- Scopula sarfaitensis Wiltshire, 1982
- Scopula sauteri Prout, 1922
- Scopula scalercii Hausmann, 2003
- Scopula scialophia Prout, 1919
- Scopula scotti Debauche, 1937
- Scopula sebata D. S. Fletcher, 1958
- Scopula seclusa Herbulot, 1972
- Scopula seclusoides Herbulot, 1978
- Scopula sedataria (Leech, 1897)
- Scopula segregata Prout, 1919
- Scopula semignobilis Inoue, 1942
- Scopula semispurcata (Warren, 1898)
- Scopula semitata (Prout, 1913)
- Scopula sentinaria (Geyer, 1837)
- Scopula separata (Walker, 1875)
- Scopula seras Prout, 1938
- Scopula serena Prout, 1920
- Scopula serratilinea (Warren, 1907)
- Scopula sevandaria (Swinhoe, 1904)
- Scopula seydeli Prout, 1934
- Scopula shiskensis (Matsumura, 1925)
- Scopula siccata McDunnough, 1939
- Scopula sideraria (Guenée, [1858])
- Scopula silonaria (Guenée, [1858])
- Scopula similata (Le Cerf, 1924)
- Scopula simplificata Prout, 1928
- Scopula sincera (Warren, 1901)
- Scopula sinnaria (Swinhoe, 1904)
- Scopula sinopersonata (Wehrli, 1932)
- Scopula sjostedti Djakonov, 1936
- Scopula sordaria Karisch, 2001
- Scopula sordida (Warren, 1895)
- Scopula sparsipunctata (Mabille, 1900)
- Scopula spectrum (Prout, 1923)
- Scopula spinosicrista Herbulot, 1992
- Scopula spissitarsata (Warren, 1899)
- Scopula spoliata (Walker, 1861)
- Scopula stenoptera Prout, 1922
- Scopula stenoptila (Prout, 1916)
- Scopula stephanitis Prout, 1932
- Scopula stigmata (Moore, 1888)
- Scopula straminea (Felder & Rogenhofer, 1875)
- Scopula subaequalis (Prout, 1917)
- Scopula subcandida Prout, 1938
- Scopula subcarnea Prout, 1934
- Scopula subdecorata (Warren, 1896)
- Scopula subgastonaria Wiltshire, 1982
- Scopula sublinearia (Walker, 1866)
- Scopula sublobata (Warren, 1898)
- Scopula sublutescens Prout, 1920
- Scopula submutata (Treitschke, 1828)
- Scopula subnictata (Snellen, 1874)
- Scopula subobliquata (Prout, 1913)
- Scopula subpartita Prout, 1919
- Scopula subpectinata (Prout, 1915)
- Scopula subperlaria (Warren, 1897)
- Scopula subpulchellata Prout, 1920
- Scopula subpunctaria (Herrich-Schäffer, 1847)
- Scopula subquadrata (Guenée, [1858])
- Scopula subrubellata Sterneck, 1941
- Scopula subserena Wiltshire, 1990
- Scopula subtaeniata (Bastelberger, 1908)
- Scopula subtilata (Christoph, 1867)
- Scopula subtracta Prout, 1935
- Scopula succrassula Prout, 1931
- Scopula suda Prout, 1932
- Scopula suffecta Prout, 1938
- Scopula suffundaria (Walker, 1861)
- Scopula suna Prout, 1934
- Scopula superciliata (Prout, 1913)
- Scopula superior (Butler, 1878)
- Scopula supernivearia Inoue, 1963
- Scopula supina Prout, 1920
- Scopula sybillaria (Swinhoe, 1902)
- Scopula synethes (Turner, 1922)
- Scopula szechuanensis (Prout, 1913)

=== T ===
- Scopula tahitiensis Orhant, 2003
- Scopula taifica Wiltshire, 1982
- Scopula takao Inoue, 1954
- Scopula tanalorum Herbulot, 1972
- Scopula technessa Prout, 1932
- Scopula tenera (Warren, 1899)
- Scopula tensipallida Prout, 1938
- Scopula tenuimargo (Prout, 1916)
- Scopula tenuimedia Prout, 1938
- Scopula tenuiscripta Prout, 1917
- Scopula tenuisocius Inoue, 1942
- Scopula tenuispersata (Fuchs, 1902)
- Scopula terminata (Wiltshire, 1966)
- Scopula ternata Schrank, 1802
- Scopula terrearia (Mabille, 1900)
- Scopula tersicallis Prout, 1929
- Scopula tessellaria (Boisduval, 1840)
- Scopula thrasia Prout, 1938
- Scopula thysanopus (Turner, 1908)
- Scopula timandrata (Walker, 1861)
- Scopula timboensis Prout, 1938
- Scopula timia (Prout, 1916)
- Scopula toquilla (D. S. Fletcher, 1978)
- Scopula tornisecta (Prout, 1916)
- Scopula tosariensis Prout, 1923
- Scopula toxophora Prout, 1919
- Scopula traducta Prout, 1938
- Scopula transmeata (Prout, 1931)
- Scopula transsecta (Warren, 1898)
- Scopula trapezistigma Prout, 1938
- Scopula tricommata (Warren, 1899)
- Scopula trisinuata (Warren, 1897)
- Scopula tsekuensis Prout, 1935
- Scopula tumiditibia Prout, 1920
- Scopula turbidaria (Hübner, [1819])
- Scopula turbulentaria (Staudinger, 1870)

=== U-V ===
- Scopula uberaria (Zerny, 1933)
- Scopula umbelaria (Hübner, [1813])
- Scopula umbilicata (Fabricius, 1794) – swag-lined wave
- Scopula umbratilinea (Warren, 1901)
- Scopula undilinea (Warren, 1900)
- Scopula undulataria (Moore, 1888)
- Scopula unicornata (Warren, 1900)
- Scopula unilineata (Warren, 1896)
- Scopula unisignata Prout, 1926
- Scopula urnaria (Guenée, [1858])
- Scopula usticinctaria (Walker, 1861)
- Scopula uvarovi (Wiltshire, 1952)
- Scopula vacuata (Guenée, [1858])
- Scopula valentinella Karisch, 2001
- Scopula variabilis (Butler, 1878)
- Scopula vicina (Thierry-Mieg, 1907)
- Scopula vicina (Gaede, 1917)
- Scopula viettei Herbulot, 1992
- Scopula vigensis Prout, 1938
- Scopula vigilata (Prout, 1913)
- Scopula vinocinctata (Guenée, [1858])
- Scopula violacea (Warren, 1897)
- Scopula virgulata ([Denis & Schiffermüller], 1775)
- Scopula vitellina Herbulot, 1978
- Scopula vitiosaria (Swinhoe, 1904)
- Scopula vittora (Schaus, 1901)
- Scopula vojnitsi Inoue, 1992
- Scopula voluptaria Prout, 1938

=== W-Z ===
- Scopula walkeri (Butler, 1883)
- Scopula wegneri Prout, 1935
- Scopula wittei Debauche, 1938
- Scopula xanthocephalata (Guenée, [1858])
- Scopula xanthomelaena D. S. Fletcher, 1957
- Scopula yamanei Inoue, 1978
- Scopula yihe Yang, 1978
- Scopula zophodes Prout, 1935

== Status unknown ==
- Scopula gyalararia (Franzenau, 1856), described as Acidalia gyalararia from Siebenburgen.
- Scopula voeltzkowi Prout, 1934, described from Africa.

== Web of life ==
Scopula species are used as a food source by various predators, including:

- Family Ichneumonoidea (Hymenoptera)
  - Aleiodes coxalis Spinola, 1808
  - Aleiodes tashimai Kusigemati, 1983
  - Aoplus defraudator Wesmael, 1845
  - Cotesia perspicua Nees, 1834
  - Homolobus (Oulophus) flagitator Curtis, 1837
  - Hoplismenus axillatorius Thunberg, 1822
  - Hyposoter thuringiacus Schmiedeknecht, 1909
  - Phobocampe crassiuscula Gravenhorst, 1829
  - Pristicerops infractorius Linnaeus, 1761
- Family Chalcidoidea (Hymenoptera)
  - Euplectrus gopimohani Mani, 1941
