= Scopula scotti =

Scientific classification
- Domain: Eukaryota
- Kingdom: Animalia
- Phylum: Arthropoda
- Class: Insecta
- Order: Lepidoptera
- Family: Geometridae
- Genus: Scopula
- Species: S. scotti

Binomial name
- Scopula scotti Debauche, 1937

Species of geometer moth in subfamily Sterrhinae

Scopula scotti is a moth of the family Geometridae. It is found in Ethiopia.

== Subspecies ==
- Scopula scotti scotti
- Scopula scotti turlini Herbulot, 1978
