= Scopula delospila =

Scientific classification
- Domain: Eukaryota
- Kingdom: Animalia
- Phylum: Arthropoda
- Class: Insecta
- Order: Lepidoptera
- Family: Geometridae
- Genus: Scopula
- Species: S. delospila

Binomial name
- Scopula delospila (Warren, 1907)

Synonyms
- Emmiltis delospila Warren 1907

Species of geometer moth in subfamily Sterrhinae

Scopula delospila is a moth of the family Geometridae. It is found in New Guinea.
