= Scopula afghana =

Scientific classification
- Domain: Eukaryota
- Kingdom: Animalia
- Phylum: Arthropoda
- Class: Insecta
- Order: Lepidoptera
- Family: Geometridae
- Genus: Scopula
- Species: S. afghana

Binomial name
- Scopula afghana (Ebert, 1965)

Synonyms
- Ustocidalia afghana Ebert, 1965

Species of geometer moth in subfamily Sterrhinae

Scopula afghana is a moth of the family Geometridae. It is endemic to Afghanistan.
