= Scopula convictorata =

Scientific classification
- Kingdom: Animalia
- Phylum: Arthropoda
- Class: Insecta
- Order: Lepidoptera
- Family: Geometridae
- Genus: Scopula
- Species: S. convictorata

Binomial name
- Scopula convictorata (Snellen, 1874)

Synonyms
- Acidalia convictorata Snellen 1874

Species of geometer moth in subfamily Sterrhinae

Scopula convictorata is a moth of the family Geometridae. It is found in Colombia.
