= Scopula cinnamomata =

Scientific classification
- Domain: Eukaryota
- Kingdom: Animalia
- Phylum: Arthropoda
- Class: Insecta
- Order: Lepidoptera
- Family: Geometridae
- Genus: Scopula
- Species: S. cinnamomata

Binomial name
- Scopula cinnamomata D. S. Fletcher, 1955

Species of geometer moth in subfamily Sterrhinae

Scopula cinnamomata is a moth of the family Geometridae. It is found in the Democratic Republic of the Congo and Uganda. It was described by David Stephen Fletcher in 1955.
