= Scopula lacriphaga =

Scientific classification
- Domain: Eukaryota
- Kingdom: Animalia
- Phylum: Arthropoda
- Class: Insecta
- Order: Lepidoptera
- Family: Geometridae
- Genus: Scopula
- Species: S. lacriphaga

Binomial name
- Scopula lacriphaga Bänziger & D. S. Fletcher, 1985

Species of geometer moth in subfamily Sterrhinae

Scopula lacriphaga is a moth of the family Geometridae described by Hans Bänziger and David Stephen Fletcher in 1985. It is found in northern Thailand and south-western China.
