= Scopula inficita =

Scientific classification
- Kingdom: Animalia
- Phylum: Arthropoda
- Class: Insecta
- Order: Lepidoptera
- Family: Geometridae
- Genus: Scopula
- Species: S. inficita

Binomial name
- Scopula inficita (Walker, 1866)

Synonyms
- Acidalia inficita Walker, 1866

Species of geometer moth in subfamily Sterrhinae

Scopula inficita is a moth of the family Geometridae. It is found in Indonesia and the Philippines.

Adults are straw/fawn coloured.

== Subspecies ==
- Scopula inficita inficita (Flores, Bali, Timor, Pura, Tenimber)
- Scopula inficita philippina Prout, 1931 (Philippines, Borneo)
