= Scopula larseni =

Scientific classification
- Kingdom: Animalia
- Phylum: Arthropoda
- Class: Insecta
- Order: Lepidoptera
- Family: Geometridae
- Genus: Scopula
- Species: S. larseni

Binomial name
- Scopula larseni (Wiltshire, 1982)

Synonyms
- Zygophyxia larseni Wiltshire, 1982

Species of geometer moth in subfamily Sterrhinae

Scopula larseni is a moth of the family Geometridae. It is found in Saudi Arabia and Oman.
