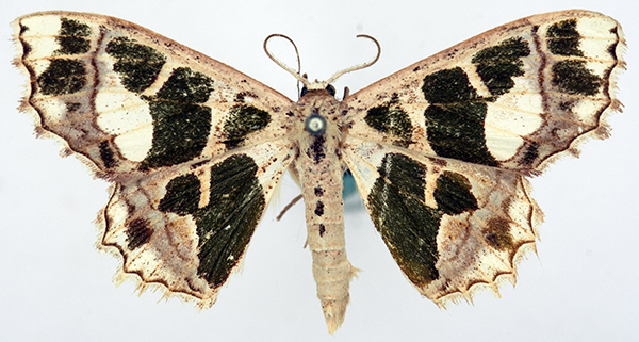

Scientific classification
- Kingdom: Animalia
- Phylum: Arthropoda
- Clade: Pancrustacea
- Class: Insecta
- Order: Lepidoptera
- Family: Geometridae
- Genus: Scopula
- Species: S. pirimacula

Binomial name
- Scopula pirimacula (Prout, 1916)

Synonyms
- Antitrygodes pirimacula Prout, 1916

= Scopula pirimacula =

Species of geometer moth in subfamily Sterrhinae

Scopula pirimacula is a moth of the family Geometridae. It is found in New Guinea.

The wingspan is 33–34 mm.
