= Scopula flavinsolata =

Scientific classification
- Kingdom: Animalia
- Phylum: Arthropoda
- Clade: Pancrustacea
- Class: Insecta
- Order: Lepidoptera
- Family: Geometridae
- Genus: Scopula
- Species: S. flavinsolata

Binomial name
- Scopula flavinsolata Holloway, 1997

Species of geometer moth in subfamily Sterrhinae

Scopula flavinsolata is a moth of the family Geometridae. It is found on Borneo. The habitat consists of lowland forests, particularly forests on limestone and adjacent alluvial forests.

The length of the forewings is 9–10 mm.
