= Scopula riedeli =

Scientific classification
- Domain: Eukaryota
- Kingdom: Animalia
- Phylum: Arthropoda
- Class: Insecta
- Order: Lepidoptera
- Family: Geometridae
- Genus: Scopula
- Species: S. riedeli

Binomial name
- Scopula riedeli Hausmann, 2006

Species of geometer moth in subfamily Sterrhinae

Scopula riedeli is a moth of the family Geometridae. It is endemic to Yemen.
