= Scopula oppunctata =

Scientific classification
- Domain: Eukaryota
- Kingdom: Animalia
- Phylum: Arthropoda
- Class: Insecta
- Order: Lepidoptera
- Family: Geometridae
- Genus: Scopula
- Species: S. oppunctata

Binomial name
- Scopula oppunctata (Warren, 1902)

Synonyms
- Craspedia oppunctata Warren, 1902; Emmiltis plenistigma Warren, 1905

Species of geometer moth in subfamily Sterrhinae

Scopula oppunctata is a moth of the family Geometridae. It is found on the Solomon Islands.

== Subspecies ==
- Scopula oppunctata oppunctata
- Scopula oppunctata plenistigma (Warren, 1905)
