= Scopula lehmanni =

Scientific classification
- Domain: Eukaryota
- Kingdom: Animalia
- Phylum: Arthropoda
- Class: Insecta
- Order: Lepidoptera
- Family: Geometridae
- Genus: Scopula
- Species: S. lehmanni

Binomial name
- Scopula lehmanni Hausmann, 1991

Synonyms
- Scopula immistaria lehmanni Hausmann, 1991

Species of geometer moth in subfamily Sterrhinae

Scopula lehmanni is a moth of the family Geometridae. It is found on the Anatolian-Iranian heights, northern Israel and Jordan.
