= Scopula pseudagrata =

Scientific classification
- Kingdom: Animalia
- Phylum: Arthropoda
- Clade: Pancrustacea
- Class: Insecta
- Order: Lepidoptera
- Family: Geometridae
- Genus: Scopula
- Species: S. pseudagrata

Binomial name
- Scopula pseudagrata (Holloway, 1997)

Synonyms
- Antitrygodes pseudagrata Holloway, 1997

Species of geometer moth in subfamily Sterrhinae

Scopula pseudagrata is a moth of the family Geometridae. It is found on Borneo and possibly the Philippines (Luzon). The habitat consists of lowland forests, alluvial forests and forests on limestone.

The wingspan is 14–15 mm for males and about 14 mm for females.
