= Scopula falcataria =

Scientific classification
- Domain: Eukaryota
- Kingdom: Animalia
- Phylum: Arthropoda
- Class: Insecta
- Order: Lepidoptera
- Family: Geometridae
- Genus: Scopula
- Species: S. falcataria

Binomial name
- Scopula falcataria (Warren, 1901)

Synonyms
- Craspedia falcataria Warren, 1901

Species of geometer moth in subfamily Sterrhinae

Scopula falcataria is a moth of the family Geometridae. It was described by Warren in 1901. It is endemic to Peru.
