= Scopula elisabethae =

Scientific classification
- Domain: Eukaryota
- Kingdom: Animalia
- Phylum: Arthropoda
- Class: Insecta
- Order: Lepidoptera
- Family: Geometridae
- Genus: Scopula
- Species: S. elisabethae

Binomial name
- Scopula elisabethae Prout, 1934

Species of geometer moth in subfamily Sterrhinae

Scopula elisabethae is a moth of the family Geometridae. It is found in Uganda, Cameroon, the Democratic Republic of Congo, Gabon and the Republic of Congo.
