= Scopula suffecta =

Scientific classification
- Kingdom: Animalia
- Phylum: Arthropoda
- Clade: Pancrustacea
- Class: Insecta
- Order: Lepidoptera
- Family: Geometridae
- Genus: Scopula
- Species: S. suffecta

Binomial name
- Scopula suffecta Prout, 1938

Species of geometer moth in subfamily Sterrhinae

Scopula suffecta is a moth of the family Geometridae. It is found in Bolivia.
