= Scopula puerca =

Scientific classification
- Domain: Eukaryota
- Kingdom: Animalia
- Phylum: Arthropoda
- Class: Insecta
- Order: Lepidoptera
- Family: Geometridae
- Genus: Scopula
- Species: S. puerca

Binomial name
- Scopula puerca (Dognin, 1901)

Synonyms
- Craspedia puerca Dognin, 1901

Species of geometer moth in subfamily Sterrhinae

Scopula puerca is a moth of the family Geometridae. It is found in Ecuador.
