= Scopula latelineata =

Scientific classification
- Domain: Eukaryota
- Kingdom: Animalia
- Phylum: Arthropoda
- Class: Insecta
- Order: Lepidoptera
- Family: Geometridae
- Genus: Scopula
- Species: S. latelineata

Binomial name
- Scopula latelineata (Graeser, 1892)

Synonyms
- Acidalia latelineata Graeser, 1892

Species of geometer moth in subfamily Sterrhinae

Scopula latelineata is a moth of the family Geometridae. It is found in Russia, Kazakhstan and Mongolia.
