= Scopula agrata =

Scientific classification
- Domain: Eukaryota
- Kingdom: Animalia
- Phylum: Arthropoda
- Class: Insecta
- Order: Lepidoptera
- Family: Geometridae
- Genus: Scopula
- Species: S. agrata

Binomial name
- Scopula agrata (Felder & Rogenhofer, 1875)

Synonyms
- Trygodes agrata Felder & Rogenhofer, 1875; Antitrygodes agrata

Species of geometer moth in subfamily Sterrhinae

Scopula agrata is a moth of the family Geometridae. It is found on the Moluccas.
