= Scopula chionaeata =

Scientific classification
- Kingdom: Animalia
- Phylum: Arthropoda
- Class: Insecta
- Order: Lepidoptera
- Family: Geometridae
- Genus: Scopula
- Species: S. chionaeata

Binomial name
- Scopula chionaeata (Herrich-Schäffer, 1870)

Synonyms
- Acidalia chionaeata Herrich-Schäffer, 1870

Species of geometer moth in subfamily Sterrhinae

Scopula chionaeata is a moth of the family Geometridae. It was described by Gottlieb August Wilhelm Herrich-Schäffer in 1870. It is endemic to Cuba.
