= Scopula pyrrhochra =

Scientific classification
- Kingdom: Animalia
- Phylum: Arthropoda
- Clade: Pancrustacea
- Class: Insecta
- Order: Lepidoptera
- Family: Geometridae
- Genus: Scopula
- Species: S. pyrrhochra

Binomial name
- Scopula pyrrhochra (Prout, 1916)

Synonyms
- Acidalia pyrrhochra Prout, 1916

Species of geometer moth in subfamily Sterrhinae

Scopula pyrrhochra is a moth of the family Geometridae. It is found in Kenya.
