= Scopula placida =

Scientific classification
- Domain: Eukaryota
- Kingdom: Animalia
- Phylum: Arthropoda
- Class: Insecta
- Order: Lepidoptera
- Family: Geometridae
- Genus: Scopula
- Species: S. placida

Binomial name
- Scopula placida (Warren, 1905)

Synonyms
- Emmiltis placida Warren, 1905

Species of geometer moth in subfamily Sterrhinae

Scopula placida is a moth of the family Geometridae. It is found on the Solomon Islands.
