= Scopula semispurcata =

Scientific classification
- Domain: Eukaryota
- Kingdom: Animalia
- Phylum: Arthropoda
- Class: Insecta
- Order: Lepidoptera
- Family: Geometridae
- Genus: Scopula
- Species: S. semispurcata

Binomial name
- Scopula semispurcata (Warren, 1898)

Synonyms
- Craspedia semispurcata Warren, 1898

Species of geometer moth in subfamily Sterrhinae

Scopula semispurcata is a moth of the family Geometridae. It is found in New Guinea.
