= Scopula dimorphata =

Scientific classification
- Domain: Eukaryota
- Kingdom: Animalia
- Phylum: Arthropoda
- Class: Insecta
- Order: Lepidoptera
- Family: Geometridae
- Genus: Scopula
- Species: S. dimorphata

Binomial name
- Scopula dimorphata (Snellen, 1881)

Synonyms
- Acidalia dimorphata Snellen, 1881; Craspedia suffidaria Swinhoe, 1902

Species of geometer moth in subfamily Sterrhinae

Scopula dimorphata is a moth of the family Geometridae. It is found in Asia, including China, Sulawesi and Bali.

== Subspecies ==
- Scopula dimorphata dimorphata (Sulawesi)
- Scopula dimorphata hainanica Prout, 1938 (Hainan)
- Scopula dimorphata suffidaria (Swinhoe, 1902) (Bali)
