= Scopula corrupta =

Scientific classification
- Domain: Eukaryota
- Kingdom: Animalia
- Phylum: Arthropoda
- Class: Insecta
- Order: Lepidoptera
- Family: Geometridae
- Genus: Scopula
- Species: S. corrupta

Binomial name
- Scopula corrupta Prout, 1931

Species of geometer moth in subfamily Sterrhinae

Scopula corrupta is a moth of the family Geometridae. It was described by Prout in 1931. It is found in western Sumatra.

The wingspan is about 24 millimetres (0.94 in).
