= Scopula hoerhammeri =

Scientific classification
- Domain: Eukaryota
- Kingdom: Animalia
- Phylum: Arthropoda
- Class: Insecta
- Order: Lepidoptera
- Family: Geometridae
- Genus: Scopula
- Species: S. hoerhammeri

Binomial name
- Scopula hoerhammeri Brandt, 1941

Species of geometer moth in subfamily Sterrhinae

Scopula hoerhammeri is a moth of the family Geometridae. It is found in Iran.
