= Scopula saphes =

Scientific classification
- Kingdom: Animalia
- Phylum: Arthropoda
- Clade: Pancrustacea
- Class: Insecta
- Order: Lepidoptera
- Family: Geometridae
- Genus: Scopula
- Species: S. saphes

Binomial name
- Scopula saphes L. B. Prout, 1920

Species of geometer moth in subfamily Sterrhinae

Scopula saphes is a moth of the family Geometridae first described by Louis Beethoven Prout in 1920. It is found in New Guinea.
