= Scopula albidaria =

Scientific classification
- Domain: Eukaryota
- Kingdom: Animalia
- Phylum: Arthropoda
- Class: Insecta
- Order: Lepidoptera
- Family: Geometridae
- Genus: Scopula
- Species: S. albidaria

Binomial name
- Scopula albidaria (Staudinger, 1901)

Synonyms
- Acidalia albidaria Staudinger, 1901

Species of geometer moth in subfamily Sterrhinae

Scopula albidaria is a moth of the family Geometridae. It is found in Central Asia.

== Subspecies ==
- Scopula albidaria albidaria
- Scopula albidaria sankana Prout, 1938 (Tian-Shan)
