= Scopula misera =

Scientific classification
- Kingdom: Animalia
- Phylum: Arthropoda
- Class: Insecta
- Order: Lepidoptera
- Family: Geometridae
- Genus: Scopula
- Species: S. misera

Binomial name
- Scopula misera (Walker, 1866)

Synonyms
- Acidalia misera Walker, 1866; Craspedia subtincta Warren, 1896; Craspedia denubilata Warren, 1902

Species of geometer moth in subfamily Sterrhinae

Scopula misera is a moth of the family Geometridae. It is found on the Tenimbar Islands and Flores.

== Subspecies ==
- Scopula misera misera (Flores)
- Scopula misera subtincta (Warren, 1896) (Tenimbar Islands)
