= Scopula wittei =

Scientific classification
- Domain: Eukaryota
- Kingdom: Animalia
- Phylum: Arthropoda
- Class: Insecta
- Order: Lepidoptera
- Family: Geometridae
- Genus: Scopula
- Species: S. wittei

Binomial name
- Scopula wittei Debauche, 1938

Species of geometer moth in subfamily Sterrhinae

Scopula wittei is a moth of the family Geometridae. It is found in the Democratic Republic of Congo.
