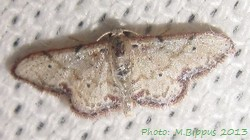

Scientific classification
- Domain: Eukaryota
- Kingdom: Animalia
- Phylum: Arthropoda
- Class: Insecta
- Order: Lepidoptera
- Family: Geometridae
- Genus: Scopula
- Species: S. minuta

Binomial name
- Scopula minuta (Warren, 1900)

Synonyms
- Haemalea minuta Warren, 1900

= Scopula minuta =

Species of geometer moth in subfamily Sterrhinae

Scopula minuta is a moth of the family Geometridae. It is found on Madagascar.
