= Scopula lugubriata =

Scientific classification
- Domain: Eukaryota
- Kingdom: Animalia
- Phylum: Arthropoda
- Class: Insecta
- Order: Lepidoptera
- Family: Geometridae
- Genus: Scopula
- Species: S. lugubriata

Binomial name
- Scopula lugubriata D. S. Fletcher, 1958

Species of geometer moth in subfamily Sterrhinae

Scopula lugubriata is a moth of the family Geometridae. It was described by David Stephen Fletcher in 1958. It is found in the Democratic Republic of the Congo and Uganda.

This species, like others in the Geometridae family, is an essential part of its ecosystem, contributing to the biodiversity and ecological balance. The habitats of Scopula lugubriata often include forested areas and grasslands, where they play roles in pollination and serve as indicators of environmental health. The species' adaptation to these regions highlights the rich and varied Lepidoptera fauna of Central Africa.
