= Scopula pallidilinea =

Scientific classification
- Kingdom: Animalia
- Phylum: Arthropoda
- Class: Insecta
- Order: Lepidoptera
- Family: Geometridae
- Genus: Scopula
- Species: S. pallidilinea

Binomial name
- Scopula pallidilinea (Warren, 1897)

Synonyms
- Craspedia pallidilinea Warren, 1897

Species of geometer moth in subfamily Sterrhinae

Scopula pallidilinea is a moth of the family Geometridae. It is found in China (Hong Kong), Sundaland and the Philippines.
