= Scopula juruana =

Scientific classification
- Domain: Eukaryota
- Kingdom: Animalia
- Phylum: Arthropoda
- Class: Insecta
- Order: Lepidoptera
- Family: Geometridae
- Genus: Scopula
- Species: S. juruana

Binomial name
- Scopula juruana (Butler, 1881)

Synonyms
- Acidalia juruana Butler, 1881; Emmiltis inquinatula Warren, 1905; Ptychopoda virginea Warren, 1897

Species of geometer moth in subfamily Sterrhinae

Scopula juruana is a moth of the family Geometridae. It was described by Arthur Gardiner Butler in 1881. It is found in the Amazon region.
