= Scopula praecanata =

Scientific classification
- Domain: Eukaryota
- Kingdom: Animalia
- Phylum: Arthropoda
- Class: Insecta
- Order: Lepidoptera
- Family: Geometridae
- Genus: Scopula
- Species: S. praecanata

Binomial name
- Scopula praecanata (Staudinger, 1896)

Synonyms
- Acidalia praecanata Staudinger, 1896

Species of geometer moth in subfamily Sterrhinae

Scopula praecanata is a moth of the family Geometridae. It is found in Tibet and central China (Sichuan).
