= Scopula densicornis =

Scientific classification
- Domain: Eukaryota
- Kingdom: Animalia
- Phylum: Arthropoda
- Class: Insecta
- Order: Lepidoptera
- Family: Geometridae
- Genus: Scopula
- Species: S. densicornis

Binomial name
- Scopula densicornis (Warren, 1897)

Synonyms
- Craspedia densicornis Warren, 1897; Craspedia fumigrisea Warren, 1898

Species of geometer moth in subfamily Sterrhinae

Scopula densicornis is a moth of the family Geometridae. It is found on Sumba.
