= Scopula kuhitangica =

Scientific classification
- Domain: Eukaryota
- Kingdom: Animalia
- Phylum: Arthropoda
- Class: Insecta
- Order: Lepidoptera
- Family: Geometridae
- Genus: Scopula
- Species: S. kuhitangica

Binomial name
- Scopula kuhitangica (Vasilenko, 1998)

Synonyms
- Pseudocinglis kuhitangica Vasilenko, 1998

Species of geometer moth in subfamily Sterrhinae

Scopula kuhitangica is a moth of the family Geometridae. It is endemic to Turkmenistan. The habitat consists of the Amygdalus-belt at Juniperus-open forest.
