= Scopula ablativa =

Scientific classification
- Domain: Eukaryota
- Kingdom: Animalia
- Phylum: Arthropoda
- Class: Insecta
- Order: Lepidoptera
- Family: Geometridae
- Genus: Scopula
- Species: S. ablativa

Binomial name
- Scopula ablativa Dognin, 1911

Synonyms
- Emmiltis ablativa Dognin, 1911

Species of geometer moths in subfamily Sterrhinae

Scopula ablativa is a moth of family Geometridae. It was described by Paul Dognin in 1911. It is endemic to Argentina.
