= Scopula dux =

Scientific classification
- Kingdom: Animalia
- Phylum: Arthropoda
- Class: Insecta
- Order: Lepidoptera
- Family: Geometridae
- Genus: Scopula
- Species: S. dux

Binomial name
- Scopula dux Prout, 1927

Species of geometer moth in subfamily Sterrhinae

Scopula dux is a moth of the family Geometridae. It is found on São Tomé.
