= Scopula pauperata =

Scientific classification
- Kingdom: Animalia
- Phylum: Arthropoda
- Clade: Pancrustacea
- Class: Insecta
- Order: Lepidoptera
- Family: Geometridae
- Genus: Scopula
- Species: S. pauperata

Binomial name
- Scopula pauperata (Walker, 1861)

Synonyms
- Acidalia pauperata Walker, 1861; Scopula oedocnemis Prout, 1926

Species of geometer moth in subfamily Sterrhinae

Scopula pauperata is a moth of the family Geometridae. It is found on Borneo. The habitat consists of lowland forests.
