= Scopula defixaria =

Scientific classification
- Kingdom: Animalia
- Phylum: Arthropoda
- Class: Insecta
- Order: Lepidoptera
- Family: Geometridae
- Genus: Scopula
- Species: S. defixaria

Binomial name
- Scopula defixaria (Walker, 1861)

Synonyms
- Acidalia defixaria Walker, 1861; Acidalia martharia Walker, 1866

Species of geometer moth in subfamily Sterrhinae

Scopula defixaria is a moth of the family Geometridae. It is found in Venezuela and Colombia.
