= Scopula bullata =

Scientific classification
- Domain: Eukaryota
- Kingdom: Animalia
- Phylum: Arthropoda
- Class: Insecta
- Order: Lepidoptera
- Family: Geometridae
- Genus: Scopula
- Species: S. bullata

Binomial name
- Scopula bullata (Vojnits, 1986)

Synonyms
- Glossotrophia bullata Vojnits, 1986

Species of geometer moth in subfamily Sterrhinae

Scopula bullata is a moth of the family Geometridae. It is found in the Baluchistan region of Iran.

The wingspan is 17–18 millimetres (0.67–0.71 in).
