= Scopula tenuispersata =

Scientific classification
- Domain: Eukaryota
- Kingdom: Animalia
- Phylum: Arthropoda
- Class: Insecta
- Order: Lepidoptera
- Family: Geometridae
- Genus: Scopula
- Species: S. tenuispersata

Binomial name
- Scopula tenuispersata (Fuchs, 1902)

Synonyms
- Acidalia tenuispersata Fuchs, 1902

Species of geometer moth in subfamily Sterrhinae

Scopula tenuispersata is a moth of the family Geometridae. It is found on Sumatra and possibly Borneo.
