= Scopula leuraria =

Scientific classification
- Kingdom: Animalia
- Phylum: Arthropoda
- Clade: Pancrustacea
- Class: Insecta
- Order: Lepidoptera
- Family: Geometridae
- Genus: Scopula
- Species: S. leuraria

Binomial name
- Scopula leuraria (Prout, 1913)

Synonyms
- Acidalia leuraria Prout, 1913

Species of geometer moth in subfamily Sterrhinae

Scopula leuraria is a moth of the family Geometridae. It is found from central China to Korea.
