= Scopula pallidiceps =

Scientific classification
- Domain: Eukaryota
- Kingdom: Animalia
- Phylum: Arthropoda
- Class: Insecta
- Order: Lepidoptera
- Family: Geometridae
- Genus: Scopula
- Species: S. pallidiceps

Binomial name
- Scopula pallidiceps (Warren, 1898)

Synonyms
- Craspedia pallidiceps Warren, 1898

Species of geometer moth in subfamily Sterrhinae

Scopula pallidiceps is a moth of the family Geometridae. It is found on Lombok, Bali, Java and possibly Borneo.
