= Scopula haematophaga =

Scientific classification
- Domain: Eukaryota
- Kingdom: Animalia
- Phylum: Arthropoda
- Class: Insecta
- Order: Lepidoptera
- Family: Geometridae
- Genus: Scopula
- Species: S. haematophaga

Binomial name
- Scopula haematophaga Bänziger & Fletcher, 1985

Species of geometer moth in subfamily Sterrhinae

Scopula haematophaga is a moth of the family Geometridae. It was described by Hans Bänziger and David Stephen Fletcher in 1985. It is found in northern Thailand, south-western China, north-western Malaysia and north-western Indonesia.
