= Scopula toquilla =

Scientific classification
- Domain: Eukaryota
- Kingdom: Animalia
- Phylum: Arthropoda
- Class: Insecta
- Order: Lepidoptera
- Family: Geometridae
- Genus: Scopula
- Species: S. toquilla

Binomial name
- Scopula toquilla (D. S. Fletcher, 1978)

Synonyms
- Zygophyxia toquilla D. S. Fletcher, 1978

Species of geometer moth in subfamily Sterrhinae

Scopula toquilla is a moth of the family Geometridae. It was described by David Stephen Fletcher in 1978. It is found in Tanzania.
