= Scopula idnothogramma =

Scientific classification
- Kingdom: Animalia
- Phylum: Arthropoda
- Clade: Pancrustacea
- Class: Insecta
- Order: Lepidoptera
- Family: Geometridae
- Genus: Scopula
- Species: S. idnothogramma

Binomial name
- Scopula idnothogramma Prout, 1938

Species of geometer moth in subfamily Sterrhinae

Scopula idnothogramma is a moth of the family Geometridae. It is found on Sulawesi.
