= Scopula ocellata =

Scientific classification
- Domain: Eukaryota
- Kingdom: Animalia
- Phylum: Arthropoda
- Class: Insecta
- Order: Lepidoptera
- Family: Geometridae
- Genus: Scopula
- Species: S. ocellata

Binomial name
- Scopula ocellata (Warren, 1899)

Synonyms
- Craspedia ocellata Warren, 1899

Species of geometer moth in subfamily Sterrhinae

Scopula ocellata is a moth of the family Geometridae. It is found on Sumbawa, Sumatra and Java.
