= Scopula radiata =

Scientific classification
- Kingdom: Animalia
- Phylum: Arthropoda
- Clade: Pancrustacea
- Class: Insecta
- Order: Lepidoptera
- Family: Geometridae
- Genus: Scopula
- Species: S. radiata

Binomial name
- Scopula radiata (Warren, 1897)

Synonyms
- Craspedia radiata Warren, 1897

Species of geometer moth in subfamily Sterrhinae

Scopula radiata is a moth of the family Geometridae. It is found in Bolivia.
