= Scopula flaccata =

Scientific classification
- Kingdom: Animalia
- Phylum: Arthropoda
- Clade: Pancrustacea
- Class: Insecta
- Order: Lepidoptera
- Family: Geometridae
- Genus: Scopula
- Species: S. flaccata

Binomial name
- Scopula flaccata (Staudinger, 1898)

Synonyms
- Acidalia flaccata Staudinger, 1898; Scopula decolor flaccata; Acidalia languidata Prout, 1913

Species of geometer moth in subfamily Sterrhinae

Scopula flaccata is a moth of the family Geometridae. It is found in the Palestinian Territories, Israel, North Africa and has recently been recorded from southern Europe (including Spain and Malta).

== Subspecies ==
- Scopula flaccata flaccata (Palestina)
- Scopula flaccata languidata (Prout, 1913) (Algeria)
