= Scopula transmeata =

Scientific classification
- Kingdom: Animalia
- Phylum: Arthropoda
- Clade: Pancrustacea
- Class: Insecta
- Order: Lepidoptera
- Family: Geometridae
- Genus: Scopula
- Species: S. transmeata

Binomial name
- Scopula transmeata (Prout, 1931)

Synonyms
- Zygophyxia transmeata Prout, 1931

Species of geometer moth in subfamily Sterrhinae

Scopula transmeata is a moth of the family Geometridae. It is found in Somalia.
