= Scopula fulvicolor =

Scientific classification
- Kingdom: Animalia
- Phylum: Arthropoda
- Class: Insecta
- Order: Lepidoptera
- Family: Geometridae
- Genus: Scopula
- Species: S. fulvicolor

Binomial name
- Scopula fulvicolor Hampson, 1899

Species of geometer moth in subfamily Sterrhinae

Scopula fulvicolor is a moth of the family Geometridae. It is found in Yemen (Socotra).
