= Scopula latifera =

Scientific classification
- Kingdom: Animalia
- Phylum: Arthropoda
- Class: Insecta
- Order: Lepidoptera
- Family: Geometridae
- Genus: Scopula
- Species: S. latifera

Binomial name
- Scopula latifera (Walker, 1869)

Synonyms
- Acidalia latifera Walker, 1869

Species of geometer moth in subfamily Sterrhinae

Scopula latifera is a moth of the family Geometridae. It is found in the Democratic Republic of Congo.
