= Scopula disparata =

Scientific classification
- Kingdom: Animalia
- Phylum: Arthropoda
- Class: Insecta
- Order: Lepidoptera
- Family: Geometridae
- Genus: Scopula
- Species: S. disparata

Binomial name
- Scopula disparata (Hampson, 1903)

Synonyms
- Craspedia disparata Hampson, 1903; Glossotrophia disparata; Glossotrophia somaliata Prout, 1916

Species of geometer moth in subfamily Sterrhinae

Scopula disparata is a moth of the family Geometridae. It is found in Kenya.

== Subspecies ==
- Scopula disparata disparata
- Scopula disparata somaliata (Prout, 1916) (Kenya: Somaliland)
