= Scopula defectiscripta =

Scientific classification
- Kingdom: Animalia
- Phylum: Arthropoda
- Clade: Pancrustacea
- Class: Insecta
- Order: Lepidoptera
- Family: Geometridae
- Genus: Scopula
- Species: S. defectiscripta

Binomial name
- Scopula defectiscripta (Prout, 1914)

Synonyms
- Acidalia defectiscripta Prout, 1914

Species of geometer moth in subfamily Sterrhinae

Scopula defectiscripta is a moth of the family Geometridae. It is found in Taiwan.
