= Scopula romanarioides =

Scientific classification
- Domain: Eukaryota
- Kingdom: Animalia
- Phylum: Arthropoda
- Class: Insecta
- Order: Lepidoptera
- Family: Geometridae
- Genus: Scopula
- Species: S. romanarioides

Binomial name
- Scopula romanarioides (Rothschild, 1913)

Synonyms
- Acidalia romanarioides Rothschild, 1913; Glossotrophia romanarioides

Species of geometer moth in subfamily Sterrhinae

Scopula romanarioides is a moth of the family Geometridae first described by Walter Rothschild in 1913. It is found in Algeria.
