= Scopula mariarosae =

Scientific classification
- Kingdom: Animalia
- Phylum: Arthropoda
- Clade: Pancrustacea
- Class: Insecta
- Order: Lepidoptera
- Family: Geometridae
- Genus: Scopula
- Species: S. mariarosae

Binomial name
- Scopula mariarosae (Expósito, 2006)

Synonyms
- Antitrygodes mariarosae Expósito, 2006

Species of geometer moth in subfamily Sterrhinae

Scopula mariarosae is a moth of the family Geometridae. It was described by Hermosa A. Expósito in 2006. It is found on Negros Island in the Philippines.
