= Scopula moralesi =

Scientific classification
- Domain: Eukaryota
- Kingdom: Animalia
- Phylum: Arthropoda
- Class: Insecta
- Order: Lepidoptera
- Family: Geometridae
- Genus: Scopula
- Species: S. moralesi

Binomial name
- Scopula moralesi (Rungs, 1945)

Synonyms
- Glossotrophia moralesi Rungs, 1945

Species of geometer moth in subfamily Sterrhinae

Scopula moralesi is a moth of the family Geometridae. It is found in Morocco.
