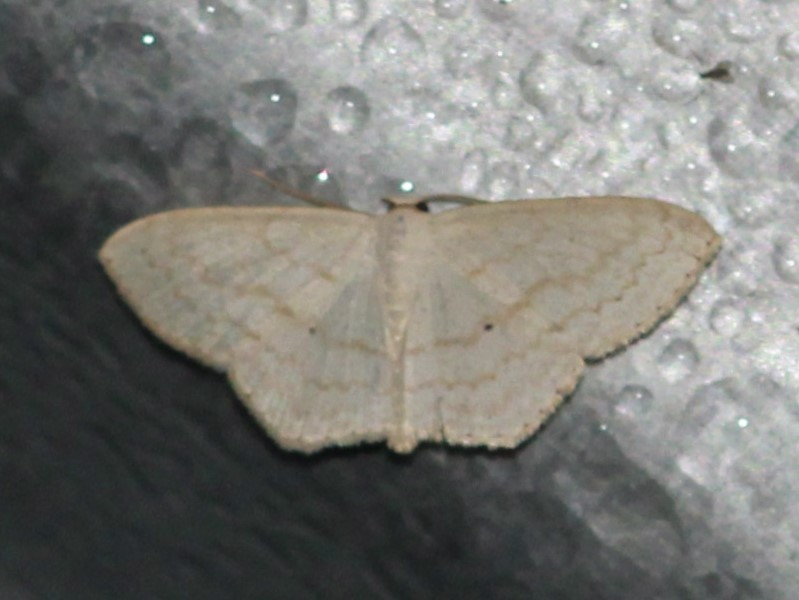

Scientific classification
- Kingdom: Animalia
- Phylum: Arthropoda
- Clade: Pancrustacea
- Class: Insecta
- Order: Lepidoptera
- Family: Geometridae
- Genus: Scopula
- Species: S. napariata

Binomial name
- Scopula napariata (Guenée, [1858])

Synonyms
- Acidalia napariata Guenee, 1858

= Scopula napariata =

Species of geometer moth in subfamily Sterrhinae

Scopula napariata is a species of moth in the family Geometridae. It is found in Brazil and Colombia.

== Subspecies ==
- Scopula napariata napariata (Brazil)
- Scopula napariata acrates Prout, 1938 (Colombia)
