= Scopula restricta =

Scientific classification
- Kingdom: Animalia
- Phylum: Arthropoda
- Clade: Pancrustacea
- Class: Insecta
- Order: Lepidoptera
- Family: Geometridae
- Genus: Scopula
- Species: S. restricta

Binomial name
- Scopula restricta (Holloway, 1997)

Synonyms
- Antitrygodes restricta Warren (manuscript name)

Species of geometer moth in subfamily Sterrhinae

Scopula restricta is a moth of the family Geometridae. It is found on Sulawesi.
