= Scopula alboverticata =

Scientific classification
- Domain: Eukaryota
- Kingdom: Animalia
- Phylum: Arthropoda
- Class: Insecta
- Order: Lepidoptera
- Family: Geometridae
- Genus: Scopula
- Species: S. alboverticata

Binomial name
- Scopula alboverticata (Warren, 1895)

Synonyms
- Leptomeris alboverticata Warren, 1895

Species of geometer butterfly in subfamily Sterrhinae

Scopula alboverticata is a moth of the family Geometridae. It is found on Timor.
