= Scopula puncticosta =

Scientific classification
- Domain: Eukaryota
- Kingdom: Animalia
- Phylum: Arthropoda
- Class: Insecta
- Order: Lepidoptera
- Family: Geometridae
- Genus: Scopula
- Species: S. puncticosta

Binomial name
- Scopula puncticosta (Walker, 1869)

Synonyms
- Acidalia puncticosta Walker, 1869

Species of geometer moth in subfamily Sterrhinae

Scopula puncticosta is a moth of the family Geometridae. It was described by Francis Walker in 1869. It is endemic to Colombia.
