= Scopula harteni =

Scientific classification
- Domain: Eukaryota
- Kingdom: Animalia
- Phylum: Arthropoda
- Class: Insecta
- Order: Lepidoptera
- Family: Geometridae
- Genus: Scopula
- Species: S. harteni

Binomial name
- Scopula harteni Hausmann, 2009

Species of geometer moth in subfamily Sterrhinae

Scopula harteni is a moth of the family Geometridae. It is found in Oman and the United Arab Emirates.
