= Scopula deflavarioides =

Scientific classification
- Kingdom: Animalia
- Phylum: Arthropoda
- Clade: Pancrustacea
- Class: Insecta
- Order: Lepidoptera
- Family: Geometridae
- Genus: Scopula
- Species: S. deflavarioides

Binomial name
- Scopula deflavarioides Holloway, 1997

Species of geometer moth in subfamily Sterrhinae

Scopula deflavarioides is a moth of the family Geometridae. It is found on Borneo. The habitat consists of wet heath forest and hill dipterocarp forest.

The length of the forewings is 8–9 mm.
