= Scopula fulminataria =

Scientific classification
- Domain: Eukaryota
- Kingdom: Animalia
- Phylum: Arthropoda
- Class: Insecta
- Order: Lepidoptera
- Family: Geometridae
- Genus: Scopula
- Species: S. fulminataria

Binomial name
- Scopula fulminataria (Turati, 1927)

Synonyms
- Acidalia fulminataria Turati, 1927

Species of geometer moth in subfamily Sterrhinae

Scopula fulminataria is a moth of the family Geometridae. It is endemic to Libya.
