= Scopula eurata =

Scientific classification
- Domain: Eukaryota
- Kingdom: Animalia
- Phylum: Arthropoda
- Class: Insecta
- Order: Lepidoptera
- Family: Geometridae
- Genus: Scopula
- Species: S. eurata

Binomial name
- Scopula eurata (Prout, 1913)

Synonyms
- Glossotrophia eurata Prout, 1913; Pseudocinglis eurata

Species of geometer moth in subfamily Sterrhinae

Scopula eurata is a moth of the family Geometridae. It was described by Prout in 1913. It is found in Turkmenistan.
