= Scopula orbeorum =

Scientific classification
- Domain: Eukaryota
- Kingdom: Animalia
- Phylum: Arthropoda
- Class: Insecta
- Order: Lepidoptera
- Family: Geometridae
- Genus: Scopula
- Species: S. orbeorum

Binomial name
- Scopula orbeorum (Hausmann, 1996)

Synonyms
- Glossotrophia orbeorum Hausmann, 1996

Species of geometer moth in subfamily Sterrhinae

Scopula orbeorum is a moth of the family Geometridae. It was described by Axel Hausmann in 1996. It is found in northern Iran.
