= Scopula andalusiaria =

Scientific classification
- Domain: Eukaryota
- Kingdom: Animalia
- Phylum: Arthropoda
- Class: Insecta
- Order: Lepidoptera
- Family: Geometridae
- Genus: Scopula
- Species: S. andalusiaria

Binomial name
- Scopula andalusiaria (Wagner, 1935)

Synonyms
- Cinglis andalusiaria Wagner, 1935

Species of geometer moth in subfamily Sterrhinae

Scopula andalusiaria is a moth of the family Geometridae. It is found in Spain and western North Africa.

== Taxonomy ==
The species was considered to be a valid species by Redondo & Gáston in 1999 and Scoble in 1999. However, Müller treated it as a subspecies of Scopula humifusaria in 1996. Hausmann reinstated it as a species in 2004.
