= Scopula candida =

Scientific classification
- Kingdom: Animalia
- Phylum: Arthropoda
- Class: Insecta
- Order: Lepidoptera
- Family: Geometridae
- Genus: Scopula
- Species: S. candida

Binomial name
- Scopula candida Prout, 1934

Species of geometer moth in subfamily Sterrhinae

Scopula candida is a moth of the family Geometridae. It was described by Prout in 1934. It is endemic to Costa Rica.
