= Scopula brachypus =

Scientific classification
- Domain: Eukaryota
- Kingdom: Animalia
- Phylum: Arthropoda
- Class: Insecta
- Order: Lepidoptera
- Family: Geometridae
- Genus: Scopula
- Species: S. brachypus

Binomial name
- Scopula brachypus Prout, 1926

Species of geometer moth in subfamily Sterrhinae

Scopula brachypus is a moth of the family Geometridae. It was described by Prout in 1926. It is endemic to Burma.
