= Scopula cesa =

Scientific classification
- Domain: Eukaryota
- Kingdom: Animalia
- Phylum: Arthropoda
- Class: Insecta
- Order: Lepidoptera
- Family: Geometridae
- Genus: Scopula
- Species: S. cesa

Binomial name
- Scopula cesa Kemal & Kocak, 2004

Synonyms
- Scopula convergens Bryk, 1949 (preocc. Warren, 1904)

Species of geometer moth in subfamily Sterrhinae

Scopula cesa is a species of moth in the family Geometridae. It is found in Korea.

== Taxonomy ==
The name Scopula convergens is a junior secondary homonym of Emmiltis convergens (Warren, 1904) and therefore required a replacement name.
