= Scopula urnaria =

Scientific classification
- Kingdom: Animalia
- Phylum: Arthropoda
- Class: Insecta
- Order: Lepidoptera
- Family: Geometridae
- Genus: Scopula
- Species: S. urnaria

Binomial name
- Scopula urnaria (Guenée, [1858])

Synonyms
- Ephyra urnaria Guenée, [1858]; Ignobilia urnaria

Species of geometer moth in subfamily Sterrhinae

Scopula urnaria is a moth of the family Geometridae. It is found on Peninsular Malaysia, Borneo and Palawan. The habitat consists of lowland dipterocarp forests.
