= Scopula brookesae =

Scientific classification
- Kingdom: Animalia
- Phylum: Arthropoda
- Clade: Pancrustacea
- Class: Insecta
- Order: Lepidoptera
- Family: Geometridae
- Genus: Scopula
- Species: S. brookesae

Binomial name
- Scopula brookesae Holloway, 1976

Species of geometer moth in subfamily Sterrhinae

Scopula brookesae is a moth of the family Geometridae. It is endemic to Borneo.
