= Scopula neophyta =

Scientific classification
- Kingdom: Animalia
- Phylum: Arthropoda
- Clade: Pancrustacea
- Class: Insecta
- Order: Lepidoptera
- Family: Geometridae
- Genus: Scopula
- Species: S. neophyta

Binomial name
- Scopula neophyta Prout, 1922

Species of geometer moth in subfamily Sterrhinae

Scopula neophyta is a moth belonging to the family Geometridae, subfamily Sterrhinae. This species is primarily found in Colombia. Its wingspan ranges between 21–23 mm.

The Genus Scopula moths are commonly known as "wave moths" due to the wavy patterns on their wings, a characteristic of the Sterrhinae subfamily. These moths are often small to medium-sized and can be challenging to differentiate based on external appearance alone. Identification typically requires careful examination of wing patterns and sometimes genitalia structure for precise taxonomy.

The Geometridae family, commonly referred to as geometer moths, is one of the most diverse moth families. The name "geometer" is derived from the Greek words "geo" (earth) and "metron" (measure), inspired by the "looping" movement of their caterpillars, often called inchworms or loopers.
