= Scopula omissa =

Scientific classification
- Domain: Eukaryota
- Kingdom: Animalia
- Phylum: Arthropoda
- Class: Insecta
- Order: Lepidoptera
- Family: Geometridae
- Genus: Scopula
- Species: S. omissa

Binomial name
- Scopula omissa (Warren, 1906)

Synonyms
- Emmiltis omissa Warren, 1906

Species of geometer moth in subfamily Sterrhinae

Scopula omissa is a moth of the family Geometridae. It is found in Bolivia.
