= Scopula eclipes =

Scientific classification
- Kingdom: Animalia
- Phylum: Arthropoda
- Clade: Pancrustacea
- Class: Insecta
- Order: Lepidoptera
- Family: Geometridae
- Genus: Scopula
- Species: S. eclipes

Binomial name
- Scopula eclipes (Prout, 1910)

Synonyms
- Acidalia eclipes Prout, 1910

Species of geometer moth in subfamily Sterrhinae

Scopula eclipes is a moth of the family Geometridae. It is found in Argentina.
