= Scopula horiochroea =

Scientific classification
- Kingdom: Animalia
- Phylum: Arthropoda
- Clade: Pancrustacea
- Class: Insecta
- Order: Lepidoptera
- Family: Geometridae
- Genus: Scopula
- Species: S. horiochroea

Binomial name
- Scopula horiochroea (Prout, 1916)

Synonyms
- Acidalia horiochroea Prout, 1916

Species of geometer moth in subfamily Sterrhinae

Scopula horiochroea is a moth of the family Geometridae. It was described by Louis Beethoven Prout in 1916 and it is found in Somaliland.
