= Scopula impropriaria =

Scientific classification
- Kingdom: Animalia
- Phylum: Arthropoda
- Class: Insecta
- Order: Lepidoptera
- Family: Geometridae
- Genus: Scopula
- Species: S. impropriaria

Binomial name
- Scopula impropriaria (Walker, 1861)

Synonyms
- Acidalia impropriaria Walker, 1861; Emmiltis tricincta Warren, 1906

Species of geometer moth in subfamily Sterrhinae

Scopula impropriaria is a moth of the family Geometridae. It is found in Venezuela and Brazil.
