= Scopula conduplicata =

Scientific classification
- Domain: Eukaryota
- Kingdom: Animalia
- Phylum: Arthropoda
- Class: Insecta
- Order: Lepidoptera
- Family: Geometridae
- Genus: Scopula
- Species: S. conduplicata

Binomial name
- Scopula conduplicata (Warren, 1904)

Synonyms
- Craspedia conduplicata Warren, 1904

Species of geometer moth in subfamily Sterrhinae

Scopula conduplicata is a moth of the family Geometridae. It was described by Warren in 1904. It is endemic to Bolivia.
