= Scopula dohertyi =

Scientific classification
- Domain: Eukaryota
- Kingdom: Animalia
- Phylum: Arthropoda
- Class: Insecta
- Order: Lepidoptera
- Family: Geometridae
- Genus: Scopula
- Species: S. dohertyi

Binomial name
- Scopula dohertyi (Warren, 1897)

Synonyms
- Craspedia dohertyi Warren, 1897

Species of geometer moth in subfamily Sterrhinae

Scopula dohertyi is a moth of the family Geometridae. It is found in southern Sulawesi.
