= Scopula perlimbata =

Scientific classification
- Kingdom: Animalia
- Phylum: Arthropoda
- Class: Insecta
- Order: Lepidoptera
- Family: Geometridae
- Genus: Scopula
- Species: S. perlimbata

Binomial name
- Scopula perlimbata (Snellen, 1874)

Synonyms
- Acidalia perlimbata Snellen, 1874; Haemalea atridiscata Warren, 1904; Haemalea atridiscata ab. obsoleta Prout, 1910

Species of geometer moth in subfamily Sterrhinae

Scopula perlimbata is a moth of the family Geometridae. It is found in Colombia and Peru.

== Subspecies ==
- Scopula perlimbata perlimbata (Colombia)
- Scopula perlimbata atridiscata (Warren, 1904) (Peru)
