= Scopula mappata =

Scientific classification
- Domain: Eukaryota
- Kingdom: Animalia
- Phylum: Arthropoda
- Class: Insecta
- Order: Lepidoptera
- Family: Geometridae
- Genus: Scopula
- Species: S. mappata

Binomial name
- Scopula mappata (Guenée, [1858])

Synonyms
- Acidalia mappata Guenée, 1858

Species of geometer moth in subfamily Sterrhinae

Scopula mappata is a moth of the family Geometridae. It was described by Achille Guenée in 1858. It is found in Brazil and northern Argentina.
