= Scopula comes =

Scientific classification
- Domain: Eukaryota
- Kingdom: Animalia
- Phylum: Arthropoda
- Class: Insecta
- Order: Lepidoptera
- Family: Geometridae
- Genus: Scopula
- Species: S. comes

Binomial name
- Scopula comes Prout, 1927

Species of geometer moth in subfamily Sterrhinae

Scopula comes is a moth of the family Geometridae. It was described by Prout in 1927. It is found on São Tomé and Príncipe.
