= Scopula usticinctaria =

Scientific classification
- Kingdom: Animalia
- Phylum: Arthropoda
- Class: Insecta
- Order: Lepidoptera
- Family: Geometridae
- Genus: Scopula
- Species: S. usticinctaria

Binomial name
- Scopula usticinctaria (Walker, 1861)

Synonyms
- Acidalia usticinctaria Walker, 1861

Species of geometer moth in subfamily Sterrhinae

Scopula usticinctaria is a moth of the family Geometridae. It is found on Borneo and Peninsular Malaysia.

Adults have very dark red margins on both wings.
