= Scopula amazonata =

Scientific classification
- Kingdom: Animalia
- Phylum: Arthropoda
- Class: Insecta
- Order: Lepidoptera
- Family: Geometridae
- Genus: Scopula
- Species: S. amazonata

Binomial name
- Scopula amazonata (Guenée, [1858])

Synonyms
- Acidalia amazonata Guenee, 1858

Species of geometer moth in subfamily Sterrhinae

Scopula amazonata is a moth of the family Geometridae. It is found in the Amazon region.
