= Scopula dehortata =

Scientific classification
- Domain: Eukaryota
- Kingdom: Animalia
- Phylum: Arthropoda
- Class: Insecta
- Order: Lepidoptera
- Family: Geometridae
- Genus: Scopula
- Species: S. dehortata

Binomial name
- Scopula dehortata (Dognin, 1901)

Synonyms
- Craspedia dehortata Dognin, 1901

Species of geometer moth in subfamily Sterrhinae

Scopula dehortata is a moth of the family Geometridae. It was described by Paul Dognin in 1901. It is endemic to Ecuador.
