= Scopula asopiata =

Scientific classification
- Domain: Eukaryota
- Kingdom: Animalia
- Phylum: Arthropoda
- Class: Insecta
- Order: Lepidoptera
- Family: Geometridae
- Genus: Scopula
- Species: S. asopiata

Binomial name
- Scopula asopiata (Guenée, [1858])

Synonyms
- Acidalia asopiata Guenée, 1858; Acidalia discriminaria Walker, 1861

Species of geometer moth in subfamily Sterrhinae

Scopula asopiata is a moth of the family Geometridae. It is found in French Guiana.
