= Scopula grisescens =

Scientific classification
- Domain: Eukaryota
- Kingdom: Animalia
- Phylum: Arthropoda
- Class: Insecta
- Order: Lepidoptera
- Family: Geometridae
- Genus: Scopula
- Species: S. grisescens

Binomial name
- Scopula grisescens (Staudinger, 1892)

Synonyms
- Acidalia grisescens Staudinger, 1892

Species of geometer moth in subfamily Sterrhinae

Scopula grisescens is a moth of the family Geometridae. It is found in Uzbekistan.
