= Scopula quinquefasciata =

Scientific classification
- Kingdom: Animalia
- Phylum: Arthropoda
- Clade: Pancrustacea
- Class: Insecta
- Order: Lepidoptera
- Family: Geometridae
- Genus: Scopula
- Species: S. quinquefasciata

Binomial name
- Scopula quinquefasciata Holloway, 1979

Species of geometer moth in subfamily Sterrhinae

Scopula quinquefasciata is a moth of the family Geometridae. It is found in New Caledonia.
