= Scopula succrassula =

Scientific classification
- Kingdom: Animalia
- Phylum: Arthropoda
- Clade: Pancrustacea
- Class: Insecta
- Order: Lepidoptera
- Family: Geometridae
- Genus: Scopula
- Species: S. succrassula

Binomial name
- Scopula succrassula Prout, 1931

Species of geometer moth in subfamily Sterrhinae

Scopula succrassula is a moth of the family Geometridae. It is found on the Philippines (Mindanao, Palawan) and Borneo.
