= Scopula discrepans =

Scientific classification
- Domain: Eukaryota
- Kingdom: Animalia
- Phylum: Arthropoda
- Class: Insecta
- Order: Lepidoptera
- Family: Geometridae
- Genus: Scopula
- Species: S. discrepans

Binomial name
- Scopula discrepans Prout, 1916

Species of geometer moth in subfamily Sterrhinae

Scopula discrepans is a moth of the family Geometridae. It was described by Prout in 1916. It is endemic to New Guinea.

== Subspecies ==
- Scopula discrepans discrepans
- Scopula discrepans infirmata Prout, 1938 (New Ireland)
