= Scopula flavorosearia =

Scientific classification
- Domain: Eukaryota
- Kingdom: Animalia
- Phylum: Arthropoda
- Class: Insecta
- Order: Lepidoptera
- Family: Geometridae
- Genus: Scopula
- Species: S. flavorosearia

Binomial name
- Scopula flavorosearia (Shchetkin, 1956)

Synonyms
- Acidalia flavorosearia Shchetkin, 1956

Species of geometer moth in subfamily Sterrhinae

Scopula flavorosearia is a moth of the family Geometridae. It is found in Tajikistan.
