= Scopula sarfaitensis =

Scientific classification
- Kingdom: Animalia
- Phylum: Arthropoda
- Class: Insecta
- Order: Lepidoptera
- Family: Geometridae
- Genus: Scopula
- Species: S. sarfaitensis

Binomial name
- Scopula sarfaitensis Wiltshire, 1982

Species of geometer moth in subfamily Sterrhinae

Scopula sarfaitensis is a moth of the family Geometridae. It is found in Saudi Arabia.
