= Scopula infota =

Scientific classification
- Domain: Eukaryota
- Kingdom: Animalia
- Phylum: Arthropoda
- Class: Insecta
- Order: Lepidoptera
- Family: Geometridae
- Genus: Scopula
- Species: S. infota

Binomial name
- Scopula infota (Warren, 1897)

Synonyms
- Craspedia infota Warren, 1897; Craspedia perfumosa Warren, 1904

Species of geometer moth in subfamily Sterrhinae

Scopula infota is a moth of the family Geometridae. It is found in Bolivia and Peru.

== Subspecies ==
- Scopula infota infota (Bolivia)
- Scopula infota perfumosa (Warren, 1904) (south-eastern Peru)
