= Scopula inactuosa =

Scientific classification
- Kingdom: Animalia
- Phylum: Arthropoda
- Clade: Pancrustacea
- Class: Insecta
- Order: Lepidoptera
- Family: Geometridae
- Genus: Scopula
- Species: S. inactuosa

Binomial name
- Scopula inactuosa Prout, 1920

Species of geometer moth in subfamily Sterrhinae

Scopula inactuosa is a moth of the family Geometridae. It is found on Sumbawa.
