= Scopula aegrefasciata =

Scientific classification
- Domain: Eukaryota
- Kingdom: Animalia
- Phylum: Arthropoda
- Class: Insecta
- Order: Lepidoptera
- Family: Geometridae
- Genus: Scopula
- Species: S. aegrefasciata

Binomial name
- Scopula aegrefasciata Sihvonen, 2001

Species of geometer moth in subfamily Sterrhinae

Scopula aegrefasciata is a moth of the family Geometridae. It is endemic to India.
