= Scopula fuscescens =

Scientific classification
- Domain: Eukaryota
- Kingdom: Animalia
- Phylum: Arthropoda
- Class: Insecta
- Order: Lepidoptera
- Family: Geometridae
- Genus: Scopula
- Species: S. fuscescens

Binomial name
- Scopula fuscescens Prout, 1934

Species of geometer moth in subfamily Sterrhinae

Scopula fuscescens is a moth of the family Geometridae. It is found in Bolivia.
