= Scopula falcovitshi =

Scientific classification
- Domain: Eukaryota
- Kingdom: Animalia
- Phylum: Arthropoda
- Class: Insecta
- Order: Lepidoptera
- Family: Geometridae
- Genus: Scopula
- Species: S. falcovitshi

Binomial name
- Scopula falcovitshi Viidalepp, 1992

Synonyms
- Pseudocinglis falcovitshi

Species of geometer moth in subfamily Sterrhinae

Scopula falcovitshi is a moth of the family Geometridae.
