= Scopula subaequalis =

Scientific classification
- Kingdom: Animalia
- Phylum: Arthropoda
- Clade: Pancrustacea
- Class: Insecta
- Order: Lepidoptera
- Family: Geometridae
- Genus: Scopula
- Species: S. subaequalis

Binomial name
- Scopula subaequalis (Prout, 1917)

Synonyms
- Antitrygodes subaequalis Prout, 1917

Species of geometer moth in subfamily Sterrhinae

Scopula subaequalis is a moth of the family Geometridae. It is found on the Solomon Islands.
