= Scopula malayana =

Scientific classification
- Domain: Eukaryota
- Kingdom: Animalia
- Phylum: Arthropoda
- Class: Insecta
- Order: Lepidoptera
- Family: Geometridae
- Genus: Scopula
- Species: S. malayana

Binomial name
- Scopula malayana Bänziger & D. S. Fletcher, 1985

Species of geometer moth in subfamily Sterrhinae

Scopula malayana is a moth of the family Geometridae described by Hans Bänziger and David Stephen Fletcher in 1985. It is found in western Malaysia.
