= Scopula spissitarsata =

Scientific classification
- Domain: Eukaryota
- Kingdom: Animalia
- Phylum: Arthropoda
- Class: Insecta
- Order: Lepidoptera
- Family: Geometridae
- Genus: Scopula
- Species: S. spissitarsata

Binomial name
- Scopula spissitarsata (Warren, 1899)

Synonyms
- Craspedia spissitarsata Warren, 1899

Species of geometer moth in subfamily Sterrhinae

Scopula spissitarsata is a moth of the family Geometridae. It is found in western Sumatra.
