= Scopula serratilinea =

Scientific classification
- Domain: Eukaryota
- Kingdom: Animalia
- Phylum: Arthropoda
- Class: Insecta
- Order: Lepidoptera
- Family: Geometridae
- Genus: Scopula
- Species: S. serratilinea

Binomial name
- Scopula serratilinea (Warren, 1907)

Synonyms
- Emmiltis serratilinea Warren, 1907

Species of geometer moth in subfamily Sterrhinae

Scopula serratilinea is a moth of the family Geometridae. It is found in Peru.
