= Scopula leuculata =

Scientific classification
- Kingdom: Animalia
- Phylum: Arthropoda
- Class: Insecta
- Order: Lepidoptera
- Family: Geometridae
- Genus: Scopula
- Species: S. leuculata

Binomial name
- Scopula leuculata (Snellen, 1874)

Synonyms
- Acidalia leuculata Snellen, 1874; Synelys nigricosta Dognin, 1911

Species of geometer moth in subfamily Sterrhinae

Scopula leuculata is a moth of the family Geometridae. It was described by Snellen in 1874. It is endemic to Colombia.
