= Scopula peractaria =

Scientific classification
- Kingdom: Animalia
- Phylum: Arthropoda
- Class: Insecta
- Order: Lepidoptera
- Family: Geometridae
- Genus: Scopula
- Species: S. peractaria

Binomial name
- Scopula peractaria (Walker, 1866)

Synonyms
- Acidalia peractaria Walker, 1866

Species of geometer moth in subfamily Sterrhinae

Scopula peractaria is a moth of the family Geometridae. It is found in New Guinea.
