= Scopula falsaria =

Scientific classification
- Domain: Eukaryota
- Kingdom: Animalia
- Phylum: Arthropoda
- Class: Insecta
- Order: Lepidoptera
- Family: Geometridae
- Genus: Scopula
- Species: S. falsaria

Binomial name
- Scopula falsaria (Herrich-Schäffer, 1852)

Synonyms
- Acidalia falsaria Herrich-Schäffer, 1852; Glossotrophia falsaria

Species of geometer moth in subfamily Sterrhinae

Scopula falsaria is a moth of the family Geometridae. It is found in the Caucasus.
