= Scopula nigristellata =

Scientific classification
- Domain: Eukaryota
- Kingdom: Animalia
- Phylum: Arthropoda
- Class: Insecta
- Order: Lepidoptera
- Family: Geometridae
- Genus: Scopula
- Species: S. nigristellata

Binomial name
- Scopula nigristellata (Warren, 1898)

Synonyms
- Craspedia nigristellata Warren, 1896

Species of geometer moth in subfamily Sterrhinae

Scopula nigristellata is a moth of the family Geometridae. It is found in Indonesia and New Guinea.

== Subspecies ==
- Scopula nigristellata nigristellata (Maluku Islands: Bacan)
- Scopula nigristellata nivimontium Prout, 1938 (New Guinea)
