= Scopula melinau =

Scientific classification
- Kingdom: Animalia
- Phylum: Arthropoda
- Clade: Pancrustacea
- Class: Insecta
- Order: Lepidoptera
- Family: Geometridae
- Genus: Scopula
- Species: S. melinau

Binomial name
- Scopula melinau Holloway, 1997

Species of geometer moth in subfamily Sterrhinae

Scopula melinau is a moth of the family Geometridae. It is found on Borneo. The habitat consists of dipterocarp forests.

The length of the forewings is about 11 mm.
