= Scopula margaritaria =

Scientific classification
- Domain: Eukaryota
- Kingdom: Animalia
- Phylum: Arthropoda
- Class: Insecta
- Order: Lepidoptera
- Family: Geometridae
- Genus: Scopula
- Species: S. margaritaria

Binomial name
- Scopula margaritaria (Warren, 1900)

Synonyms
- Craspedia margaritaria Warren, 1900

Species of geometer moth in subfamily Sterrhinae

Scopula margaritaria is a moth of the family Geometridae. It is found on Sulawesi.
