= Scopula benguetensis =

Scientific classification
- Kingdom: Animalia
- Phylum: Arthropoda
- Class: Insecta
- Order: Lepidoptera
- Family: Geometridae
- Genus: Scopula
- Species: S. benguetensis

Binomial name
- Scopula benguetensis Prout, 1931

Species of geometer moth in subfamily Sterrhinae

Scopula benguetensis is a moth of the family Geometridae. It was described by Prout in 1931. It is found on the Philippines (Luzon).
