= Scopula dorsinigrata =

Scientific classification
- Domain: Eukaryota
- Kingdom: Animalia
- Phylum: Arthropoda
- Class: Insecta
- Order: Lepidoptera
- Family: Geometridae
- Genus: Scopula
- Species: S. dorsinigrata

Binomial name
- Scopula dorsinigrata (Warren, 1904)

Synonyms
- Craspedia dorsinigrata Warren, 1904

Species of geometer moth in subfamily Sterrhinae

Scopula dorsinigrata is a moth of the family Geometridae. It is found in south-eastern Peru.
