= Scopula pseudodoxa =

Scientific classification
- Kingdom: Animalia
- Phylum: Arthropoda
- Clade: Pancrustacea
- Class: Insecta
- Order: Lepidoptera
- Family: Geometridae
- Genus: Scopula
- Species: S. pseudodoxa

Binomial name
- Scopula pseudodoxa L. B. Prout, 1920

Synonyms
- Scopula pseudocoxa

Species of geometer moth in subfamily Sterrhinae

Scopula pseudodoxa is a moth of the family Geometridae. It was described by Louis Beethoven Prout in 1920. It is found on Woodlark Island in Papua New Guinea.

The wingspan is 15–18 millimetres (0.59–0.71 in).
