= Scopula regenerata =

Scientific classification
- Domain: Eukaryota
- Kingdom: Animalia
- Phylum: Arthropoda
- Class: Insecta
- Order: Lepidoptera
- Family: Geometridae
- Genus: Scopula
- Species: S. regenerata

Binomial name
- Scopula regenerata (Fabricius, 1794)

Synonyms
- Phalaena regenerata Fabricius, 1794

Species of geometer moth in subfamily Sterrhinae

Scopula regenerata is a moth of the family Geometridae. It is found in the West Indies.
