= Scopula mustangensis =

Scientific classification
- Domain: Eukaryota
- Kingdom: Animalia
- Phylum: Arthropoda
- Class: Insecta
- Order: Lepidoptera
- Family: Geometridae
- Genus: Scopula
- Species: S. mustangensis

Binomial name
- Scopula mustangensis Yazaki, 1995

Species of geometer moth in subfamily Sterrhinae

Scopula mustangensis is a moth of the family Geometridae. It is found in the Palaearctic region.
