= Scopula subnictata =

Scientific classification
- Kingdom: Animalia
- Phylum: Arthropoda
- Class: Insecta
- Order: Lepidoptera
- Family: Geometridae
- Genus: Scopula
- Species: S. subnictata

Binomial name
- Scopula subnictata (Snellen, 1874)

Synonyms
- Acidalia subnictata Snellen 1874

Species of geometer moth in subfamily Sterrhinae

Scopula subnictata is a moth of the family Geometridae. It is found in Colombia.

== Subspecies ==
- Scopula subnictata subnictata (Colombia)
- Scopula subnictata cuphoptera Prout, 1938 (Colombia)
