= Scopula andresi =

Scientific classification
- Domain: Eukaryota
- Kingdom: Animalia
- Phylum: Arthropoda
- Class: Insecta
- Order: Lepidoptera
- Family: Geometridae
- Genus: Scopula
- Species: S. andresi

Binomial name
- Scopula andresi (Draudt, 1912)

Synonyms
- Acidalia andresi Draudt 1912

Species of geometer moth in subfamily Sterrhinae

Scopula andresi is a moth of the family Geometridae. It was described by Max Wilhelm Karl Draudt in 1912. It is endemic to Egypt.
