= Scopula alstoni =

Scientific classification
- Kingdom: Animalia
- Phylum: Arthropoda
- Class: Insecta
- Order: Lepidoptera
- Family: Geometridae
- Genus: Scopula
- Species: S. alstoni

Binomial name
- Scopula alstoni Prout, 1919

Species of geometer moth in subfamily Sterrhinae

Scopula alstoni is a moth of the family Geometridae. It was described by Prout in 1919. It is endemic to Sri Lanka.
