= Scopula nacida =

Scientific classification
- Domain: Eukaryota
- Kingdom: Animalia
- Phylum: Arthropoda
- Class: Insecta
- Order: Lepidoptera
- Family: Geometridae
- Genus: Scopula
- Species: S. nacida

Binomial name
- Scopula nacida (Dognin, 1901)

Synonyms
- Craspedia nacida Dognin, 1901; Emmiltis cinerosaria Warren, 1904

Species of geometer moth in subfamily Sterrhinae

Scopula nacida is a moth of the family Geometridae. It was described by Paul Dognin in 1901. It is found in Ecuador and Peru.

== Subspecies ==
It has two subspecies:

- Scopula nacida nacida (Ecuador)
- Scopula nacida cinerosaria (Warren, 1904) (Peru)
