= Scopula caledonica =

Scientific classification
- Kingdom: Animalia
- Phylum: Arthropoda
- Clade: Pancrustacea
- Class: Insecta
- Order: Lepidoptera
- Family: Geometridae
- Genus: Scopula
- Species: S. caledonica

Binomial name
- Scopula caledonica Holloway, 1979

Species of geometer moth in subfamily Sterrhinae

Scopula caledonica is a moth of the family Geometridae. It is endemic to New Caledonia.
