= Scopula asymmetrica =

Scientific classification
- Kingdom: Animalia
- Phylum: Arthropoda
- Clade: Pancrustacea
- Class: Insecta
- Order: Lepidoptera
- Family: Geometridae
- Genus: Scopula
- Species: S. asymmetrica

Binomial name
- Scopula asymmetrica Holloway, 1997

Species of geometer moth in subfamily Sterrhinae

Scopula asymmetrica is a moth of the family Geometridae. It is endemic to Borneo. Its habitat consists of alluvial forests, wet heath forests and lower montane forests on limestone.

The wingspan is 8–9 millimetres (0.31–0.35 in). Adults are grey brown.
