= Scopula heidra =

Scientific classification
- Kingdom: Animalia
- Phylum: Arthropoda
- Class: Insecta
- Order: Lepidoptera
- Family: Geometridae
- Genus: Scopula
- Species: S. heidra

Binomial name
- Scopula heidra Debauche, 1938

Species of geometer moth in subfamily Sterrhinae

Scopula heidra is a moth of the family Geometridae. It was described by Hubert Robert Debauche in 1938 and is endemic to the Democratic Republic of the Congo.
