= Scopula aetheomorpha =

Scientific classification
- Kingdom: Animalia
- Phylum: Arthropoda
- Class: Insecta
- Order: Lepidoptera
- Family: Geometridae
- Genus: Scopula
- Species: S. aetheomorpha

Binomial name
- Scopula aetheomorpha Prout, 1917

Species of geometer moth in subfamily Sterrhinae

Scopula aetheomorpha is a moth of the family Geometridae. It was described by Prout in 1917. It is found in Papua New Guinea.
