= Scopula magnipunctata =

Scientific classification
- Kingdom: Animalia
- Phylum: Arthropoda
- Class: Insecta
- Order: Lepidoptera
- Family: Geometridae
- Genus: Scopula
- Species: S. magnipunctata

Binomial name
- Scopula magnipunctata D. S. Fletcher, 1958

Species of geometer moth in subfamily Sterrhinae

Scopula magnipunctata is a moth of the family Geometridae. It was described by David Stephen Fletcher in 1958. It is found in Uganda.
