= Scopula homaema =

Scientific classification
- Kingdom: Animalia
- Phylum: Arthropoda
- Clade: Pancrustacea
- Class: Insecta
- Order: Lepidoptera
- Family: Geometridae
- Genus: Scopula
- Species: S. homaema

Binomial name
- Scopula homaema Prout, 1920

Species of geometer moth in subfamily Sterrhinae

Scopula homaema is a moth of the family Geometridae. It is found on the Solomon Islands.
