= Scopula contramutata =

Scientific classification
- Domain: Eukaryota
- Kingdom: Animalia
- Phylum: Arthropoda
- Class: Insecta
- Order: Lepidoptera
- Family: Geometridae
- Genus: Scopula
- Species: S. contramutata

Binomial name
- Scopula contramutata Prout, 1920

Species of geometer moth in subfamily Sterrhinae

Scopula contramutata is a moth of the family Geometridae. It is endemic to Russia.

== Taxonomy ==
The species was formerly listed as a subspecies of Scopula immutata, Scopula immutata contramutata.
