= Scopula nebulata =

Scientific classification
- Domain: Eukaryota
- Kingdom: Animalia
- Phylum: Arthropoda
- Class: Insecta
- Order: Lepidoptera
- Family: Geometridae
- Genus: Scopula
- Species: S. nebulata

Binomial name
- Scopula nebulata D. S. Fletcher, 1963

Species of geometer moth in subfamily Sterrhinae

Scopula nebulata is a moth of the family Geometridae. It was described by David Stephen Fletcher in 1963. It is found in the Democratic Republic of the Congo and Rwanda.
