= Scopula clarivialis =

Scientific classification
- Kingdom: Animalia
- Phylum: Arthropoda
- Clade: Pancrustacea
- Class: Insecta
- Order: Lepidoptera
- Family: Geometridae
- Genus: Scopula
- Species: S. clarivialis

Binomial name
- Scopula clarivialis Prout, 1931

Species of geometer moth in subfamily Sterrhinae

Scopula clarivialis is a moth of the family Geometridae. It is found on western Sumatra.
