= Scopula annubiata =

Scientific classification
- Domain: Eukaryota
- Kingdom: Animalia
- Phylum: Arthropoda
- Class: Insecta
- Order: Lepidoptera
- Family: Geometridae
- Genus: Scopula
- Species: S. annubiata

Binomial name
- Scopula annubiata (Staudinger, 1892)

Synonyms
- Acidalia annubiata Staudinger 1892

Species of geometer moth in subfamily Sterrhinae

Scopula annubiata is a moth of the family Geometridae. It was described by Staudinger in 1892. It is endemic to Uzbekistan.
