= Scopula hackeri =

Scientific classification
- Kingdom: Animalia
- Phylum: Arthropoda
- Class: Insecta
- Order: Lepidoptera
- Family: Geometridae
- Genus: Scopula
- Species: S. hackeri

Binomial name
- Scopula hackeri Hausmann, 1999

Species of geometer moth in subfamily Sterrhinae

Scopula hackeri is a moth of the family Geometridae. It is found in Yemen.
