= Scopula seydeli =

Scientific classification
- Domain: Eukaryota
- Kingdom: Animalia
- Phylum: Arthropoda
- Class: Insecta
- Order: Lepidoptera
- Family: Geometridae
- Genus: Scopula
- Species: S. seydeli

Binomial name
- Scopula seydeli Prout, 1934

Synonyms
- Scopula subsincera Herbulot, 1954

Species of geometer moth in subfamily Sterrhinae

Scopula seydeli is a moth of the family Geometridae. It is found in the Democratic Republic of Congo, Kenya, Malawi and Uganda.
