= Scopula phallarcuata =

Scientific classification
- Kingdom: Animalia
- Phylum: Arthropoda
- Clade: Pancrustacea
- Class: Insecta
- Order: Lepidoptera
- Family: Geometridae
- Genus: Scopula
- Species: S. phallarcuata

Binomial name
- Scopula phallarcuata Holloway, 1997

Species of geometer moth in subfamily Sterrhinae

Scopula phallarcuata is a moth of the family Geometridae. It is found on Borneo. The habitat consists of lowland forests and lower montane forests on limestone. It has also been recorded from various softwood plantations in the lowlands of Sabah.

The length of the forewings is 7–8 mm (0.28–0.31 in).
