= Scopula nigrocellata =

Scientific classification
- Domain: Eukaryota
- Kingdom: Animalia
- Phylum: Arthropoda
- Class: Insecta
- Order: Lepidoptera
- Family: Geometridae
- Genus: Scopula
- Species: S. nigrocellata

Binomial name
- Scopula nigrocellata (Warren, 1899)

Synonyms
- Craspedia nigrocellata Warren, 1899

Species of geometer moth in subfamily Sterrhinae

Scopula nigrocellata is a moth of the family Geometridae. It is found on the Moluccas.
