= Scopula ochrea =

Scientific classification
- Domain: Eukaryota
- Kingdom: Animalia
- Phylum: Arthropoda
- Class: Insecta
- Order: Lepidoptera
- Family: Geometridae
- Genus: Scopula
- Species: S. ochrea

Binomial name
- Scopula ochrea (Hausmann, 2006)

Synonyms
- Zygophyxia ochrea Hausmann, 2006

Species of geometer moth in subfamily Sterrhinae

Scopula ochrea is a moth of the family Geometridae. It is found in Yemen and Oman.
