= Scopula omnisona =

Scientific classification
- Kingdom: Animalia
- Phylum: Arthropoda
- Clade: Pancrustacea
- Class: Insecta
- Order: Lepidoptera
- Family: Geometridae
- Genus: Scopula
- Species: S. omnisona

Binomial name
- Scopula omnisona (Prout, 1915)

Synonyms
- Acidalia omnisona Prout, 1915

Species of geometer moth in subfamily Sterrhinae

Scopula omnisona is a moth of the family Geometridae. It is found in Madagascar.

The male of this species has a wingspan of 17 millimetres (0.67 in), its face and palpus are red, the vertex is grey and the thorax and abdomen are pinkish grey.

The fore wings are pale pinkish-grey or violet-grey with a few scattered black scales.

== Subspecies ==
- Scopula omnisona omnisona
- Scopula omnisona septentrionis Herbulot, 1972
