= Cotesia perspicua =

Scientific classification
- Kingdom: Animalia
- Phylum: Arthropoda
- Class: Insecta
- Order: Hymenoptera
- Family: Braconidae
- Genus: Cotesia
- Species: C. perspicua

Binomial name
- Cotesia perspicua (Nees, 1834)

Synonyms
- Cotesia cajae (Bouche, 1834); Cotesia difficilis (Nees, 1834)

Species of wasp

Cotesia perspicua is a species of wasp in the genus Cotesia. It was identified by Christian Gottfried Daniel Nees von Esenbeck in 1834.

== Distribution ==
It is found in: Azerbaijan, Belarus, Belgium, China, Croatia, Czech Republic, Czechoslovakia, Finland, France, Georgia, Germany, Hungary, Italy, Kazakhstan, Latvia, Moldova, Netherlands, Poland, Romania, Russia, Slovakia, Spain, Spain-main, Sweden, Switzerland, Tajikistan, Ukraine, United Kingdom, Uzbekistan and Yugoslavia.

== Web of life ==
Its life web consists of 74 partners.
