= List of moths of South Africa (Geometridae) =

This is a list of moths of the family Geometridae that are found in South Africa. It also acts as an index to the species articles and forms part of the full List of moths of South Africa.

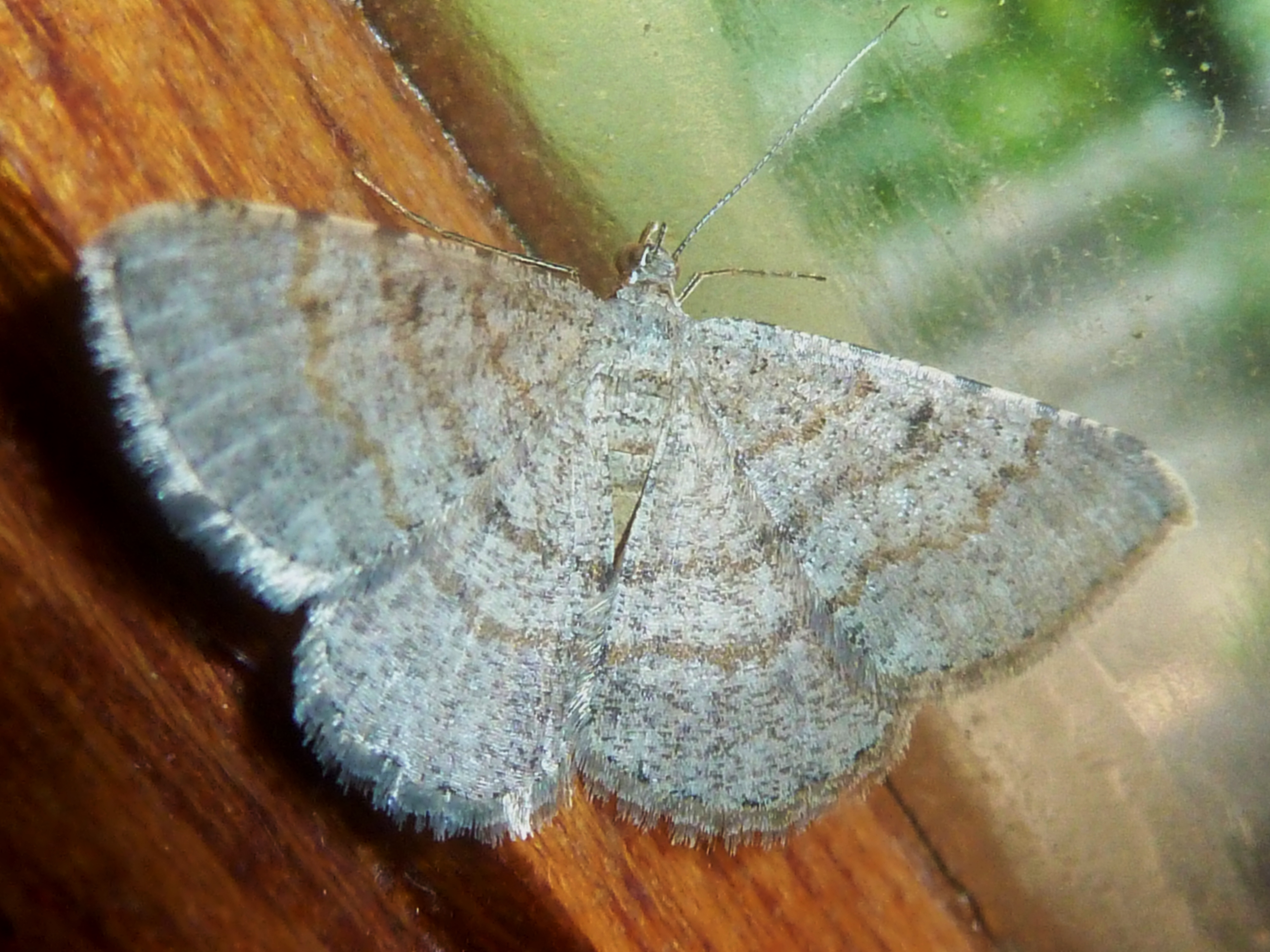
Acanthovalva inconspicuaria

- Acanthovalva bilineata (Warren, 1895)
- Acanthovalva capensis Krüger, 2001
- Acanthovalva focularia (Geyer, 1837)
- Acanthovalva inconspicuaria (Hübner, 1796)
- Acidaliastis bicurvifera Prout, 1916
- Acidaliastis curvilinea (Prout, 1912)
- Acidaliastis prophanes Prout, 1922
- Acollesis fraudulenta Warren, 1898
- Acollesis terminata Prout, 1912
- Acrasia crinita Felder & Rogenhofer, 1875
- Adicocrita araria (Guenée, 1858)
- Adicocrita discerpta (Walker, 1861)
- Adicocrita koranata (Felder & Rogenhofer, 1875)
- Afrophyla vethi (Snellen, 1886)
- Allochlorodes elpis Prout, 1917
- Allochrostes biornata Prout, 1913
- Allochrostes imperfecta Prout, 1916
- Allochrostes saliata (Felder & Rogenhofer, 1875)
- Anacleora extremaria (Walker, 1860)
- Anacleora pulverosa (Warren, 1904)
- Androzeugma mollior Prout, 1922
- Antharmostes papilio Prout, 1912
- Anthemoctena textilis (Wallengren, 1872)
- Aphilopota conturbata (Walker, 1863)
- Aphilopota decepta Janse, 1932
- Aphilopota euodia Prout, 1954
- Aphilopota inspersaria (Guenée, 1858)
- Aphilopota interpellans (Butler, 1875)
- Aphilopota iphia Prout, 1954
- Aphilopota patulata (Walker, 1863)
- Aphilopota perscotia Prout, 1931
- Aphilopota phanerostigma Prout, 1917
- Aphilopota rubidivenis (Prout, 1922)
- Aphilopota semiusta (Distant, 1898)
- Aphilopota sinistra Prout, 1954
- Aphilopota subalbata (Warren, 1905)
- Aplocera efformata (Guenée, 1858)
- Aplocera trajectata (Walker, 1863)
- Argyrographa moderata (Walker, 1862)
- Argyrophora arcualis (Duncan [& Westwood], 1841)
- Argyrophora confluens Krüger, 1999
- Argyrophora intervenata (Prout, 1917)
- Argyrophora leucochrysa Krüger, 1999
- Argyrophora retifera Krüger, 1999
- Argyrophora rhampsinitos Krüger, 1999
- Argyrophora stramineata Krüger, 1999
- Argyrophora trofonia (Cramer, 1779)
- Argyrophora variabilis Krüger, 1999

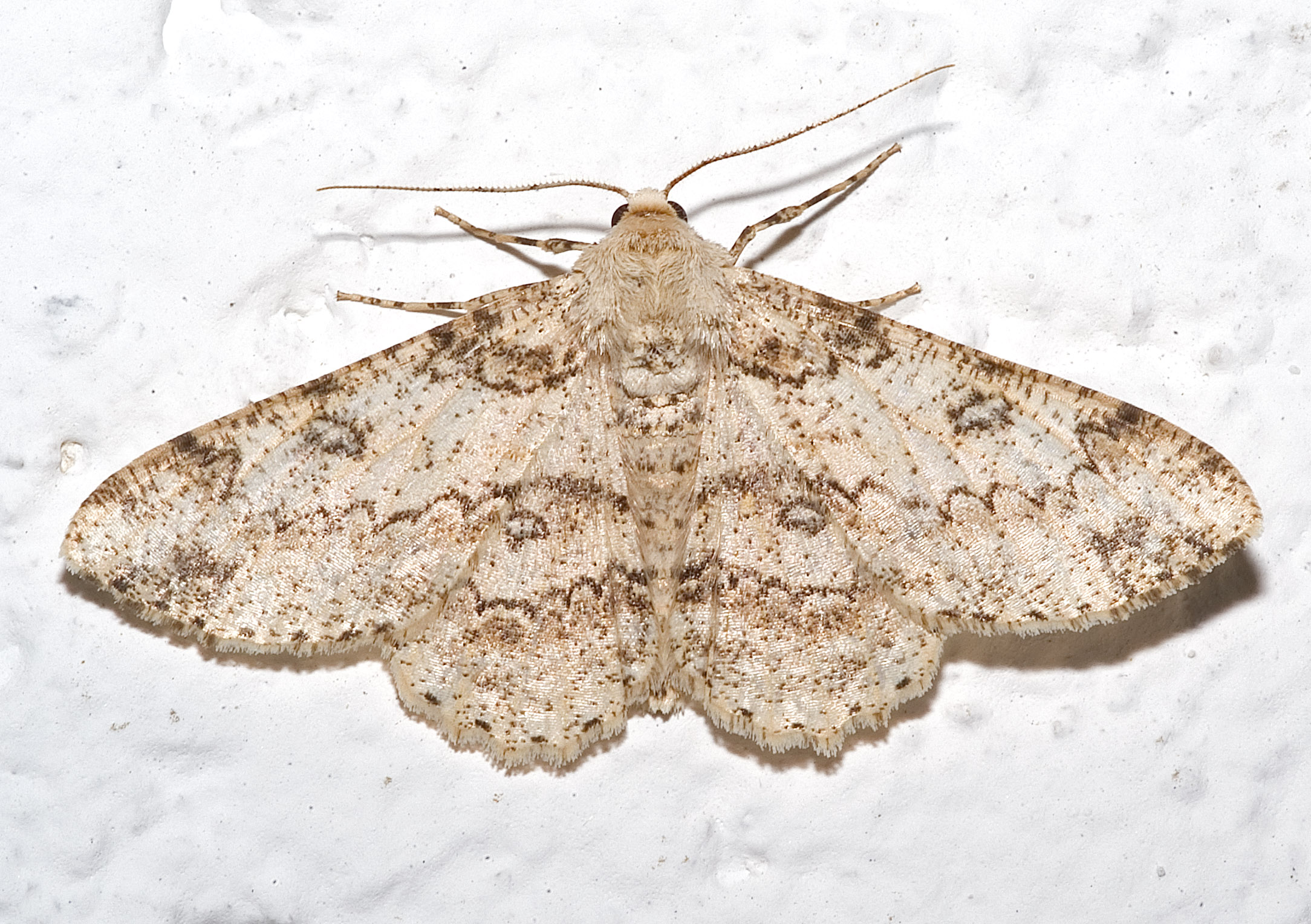
Ascotis selenaria

- Ascotis reciprocaria (Walker, 1860)
- Ascotis selenaria ([Denis & Schiffermüller], 1775)
- Aspitates illepidata Walker, 1862
- Aspitates inceptaria Walker, 1863
- Aspitates sabuliferata Walker, 1863
- Asthenotricha inutilis Warren, 1901
- Asthenotricha pycnoconia Janse, 1933
- Asthenotricha serraticornis Warren, 1902
- Barrama impunctata Warren, 1897
- Bathycolpodes chloronesis Prout, 1930
- Biclavigera deterior Prout, 1916
- Biclavigera fontis Prout, 1938
- Biclavigera praecanaria (Herrich-Schäffer, 1855)
- Biclavigera rufivena (Warren, 1911)
- Biclavigera uloprora Prout, 1938
- Buttia noctuodes Warren, 1904
- Cabera aquaemontana (Prout, 1913)
- Cabera elatina (Prout, 1913)
- Cabera neodora Prout, 1922
- Cabera nevillei Krüger, 2000
- Cabera pseudognophos (Prout, 1917)
- Cabera strigata (Warren, 1897)
- Callioratis abraxas Felder, 1874
- Callioratis curlei Staude, 2001
- Callioratis mayeri Staude, 2001
- Callioratis millari Hampson, 1905

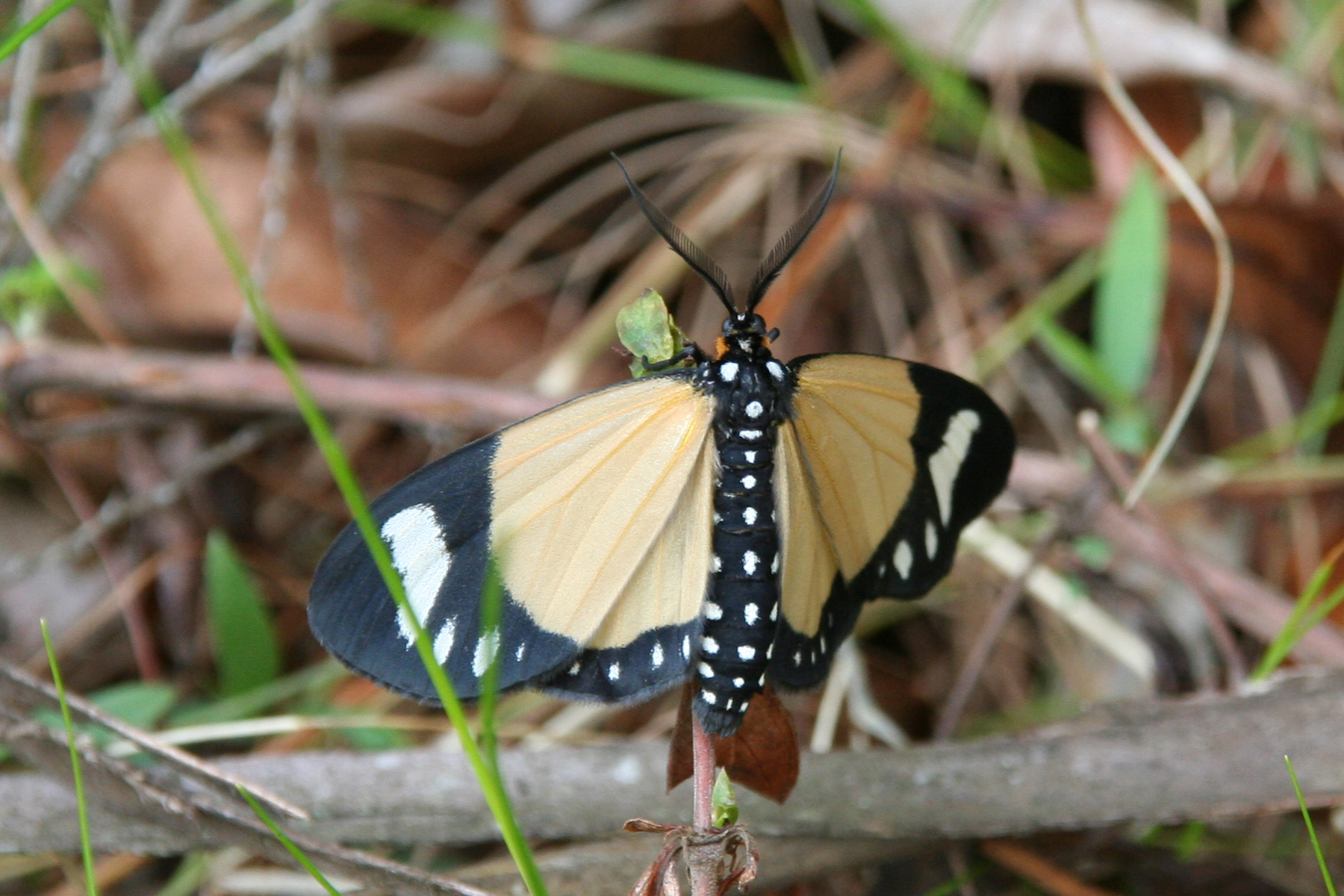
Cartaletis libyssa

- Cartaletis concolor Warren, 1905
- Cartaletis libyssa (Hopffer, 1857)
- Celidomphax quadrimacula Janse, 1935
- Celidomphax rubrimaculata (Warren, 1905)
- Centrochria deprensa (Prout, 1913)
- Cerurographa bistonica (Prout, 1922)
- Chelotephrina acorema Krüger, 2001

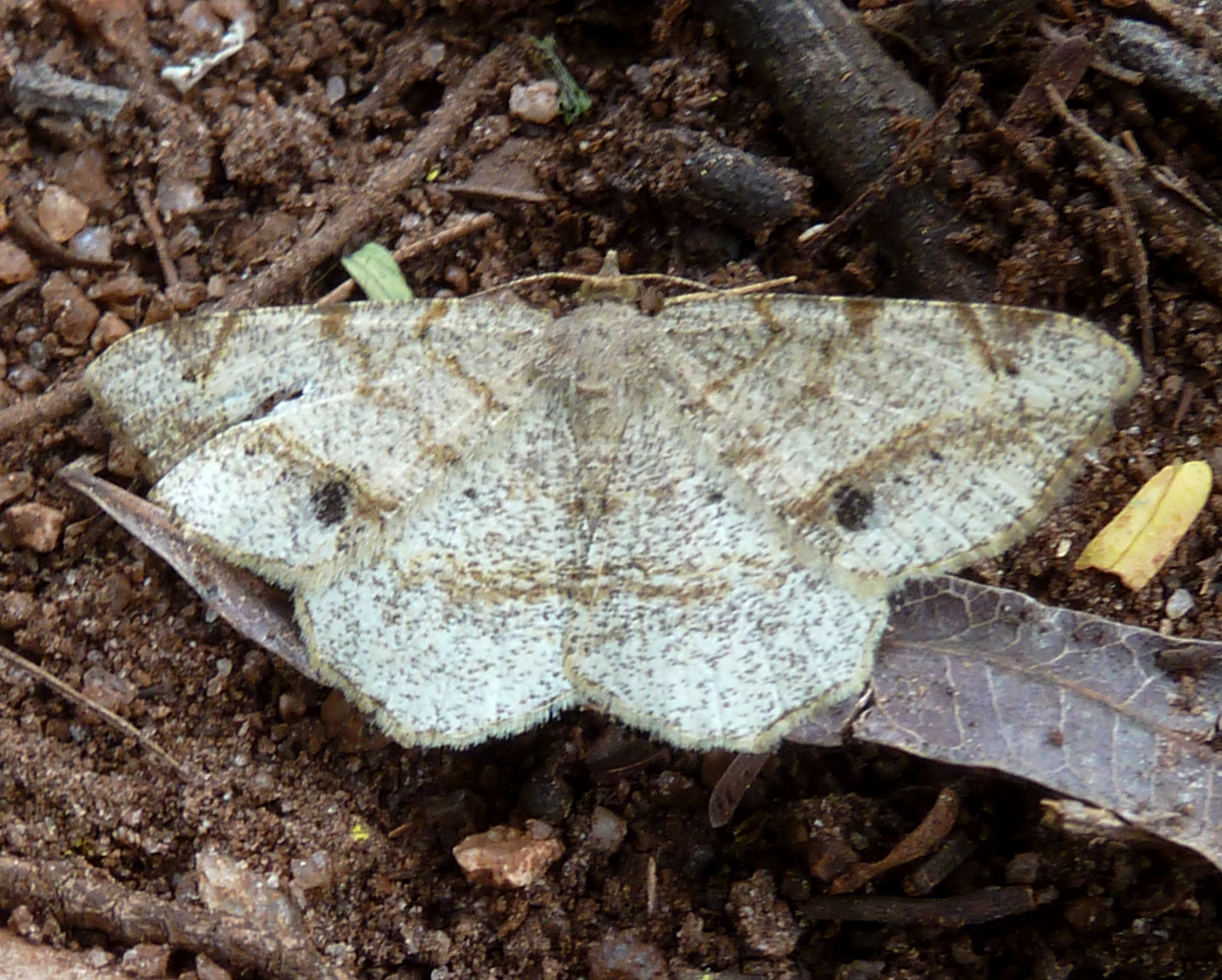
Chiasmia brongusaria

- Chiasmia abnormata (Prout, 1917)
- Chiasmia alternata (Warren, 1899)
- Chiasmia amarata (Guenée, 1858)
- Chiasmia arenosa (Butler, 1875)
- Chiasmia assimilis (Warren, 1899)
- Chiasmia boarmioides Krüger, 2001
- Chiasmia bomfordi Krüger, 2001
- Chiasmia brongusaria (Walker, 1860)
- Chiasmia brunnescens Krüger, 2001
- Chiasmia castanea Krüger, 2001
- Chiasmia confuscata (Warren, 1899)
- Chiasmia contaminata (Warren, 1902)
- Chiasmia costiguttata (Warren, 1899)
- Chiasmia deceptrix Krüger, 2001
- Chiasmia deleta Krüger, 2001
- Chiasmia diarmodia (Prout, 1925)
- Chiasmia duplicilinea (Warren, 1897)
- Chiasmia feraliata (Guenée, 1858)
- Chiasmia furcata (Warren, 1897)
- Chiasmia fuscataria (Möschler, 1887)
- Chiasmia grimmia (Wallengren, 1872)
- Chiasmia grisescens (Prout, 1916)
- Chiasmia hunyani Krüger, 2001
- Chiasmia inaequilinea (Warren, 1911)
- Chiasmia inconspicua (Warren, 1897)
- Chiasmia inquinata Krüger, 2001
- Chiasmia interrupta (Warren, 1897)
- Chiasmia johnstoni (Butler, 1893)
- Chiasmia kirbyi (Wallengren, 1875)
- Chiasmia majestica (Warren, 1901)
- Chiasmia marmorata (Warren, 1897)
- Chiasmia maronga Krüger, 2001
- Chiasmia melsetter Krüger, 2001
- Chiasmia multistrigata (Warren, 1897)
- Chiasmia murina Krüger, 2001
- Chiasmia nana (Warren, 1898)
- Chiasmia natalensis (Warren, 1904)
- Chiasmia nevilledukei Krüger, 2001
- Chiasmia ngami Krüger, 2001
- Chiasmia nobilitata (Prout, 1913)
- Chiasmia normata (Walker, 1861)
- Chiasmia observata (Walker, 1861)
- Chiasmia orientalis Krüger, 2001
- Chiasmia paucimacula Krüger, 2001
- Chiasmia pinheyi Krüger, 2001
- Chiasmia procidata (Guenée, 1858)
- Chiasmia rectilinea (Warren, 1905)
- Chiasmia rectistriaria (Herrich-Schäffer, 1854)
- Chiasmia rhabdophora (Holland, 1892)
- Chiasmia semiolivacea Krüger, 2001
- Chiasmia semitecta (Walker, 1861)

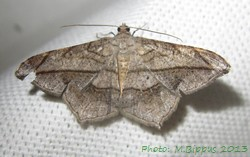
Chiasmia simplicilinea

- Chiasmia simplicilinea (Warren, 1905)
- Chiasmia sororcula (Warren, 1897)
- Chiasmia streniata (Guenée, 1858)
- Chiasmia subcurvaria (Mabille, 1897)
- Chiasmia subvaria (Bastelberger, 1907)
- Chiasmia suriens (Strand, 1912)
- Chiasmia tecnium (Prout, 1916)
- Chiasmia threnopis (D. S. Fletcher, 1963)
- Chiasmia tristis Krüger, 2001
- Chiasmia trizonaria (Hampson, 1909)
- Chiasmia turbulentata (Guenée, 1858)
- Chiasmia umbrata (Warren, 1897)
- Chiasmia umbratilis (Butler, 1875)
- Chiasmia uniformis Krüger, 2001
- Chiasmia vau (Prout, 1913)
- Chiasmia zobrysi Krüger, 2001
- Chionopora tarachodes Prout, 1922
- Chlorerythra rubriplaga Warren, 1895
- Chlorissa albistrigulata (Warren, 1897)
- Chlorissa articulicornis (Prout, 1916)
- Chlorissa attenuata (Walker, 1862)
- Chlorissa dorsicristata (Warren, 1905)
- Chlorissa inornata Prout, 1930
- Chlorissa malescripta (Warren, 1897)
- Chlorissa ruficristata (Prout, 1916)
- Chlorissa unilinea (Warren, 1897)

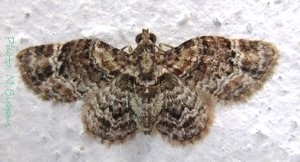
Chloroclystis derasata

- Chloroclystis consocer Prout, 1937
- Chloroclystis dentatissima Warren, 1898
- Chloroclystis derasata (Bastelberger, 1905)
- Chloroclystis gymnoscelides Prout, 1916
- Chloroclystis muscosa (Warren, 1902)
- Chlorocoma clopia Prout, 1922
- Chlorocoma didita (Walker, 1861)
- Chlorocoma dilatata (Walker, 1861)
- Chlorocoma eucela Prout, 1922
- Chloroctenis conspersa Warren, 1909
- Chlorosterrha dichroma (Felder & Rogenhofer, 1875)
- Chlorosterrha monochroma Prout, 1912
- Chrysocraspeda leighata Warren, 1904
- Chrysocraspeda nigribasalis Warren, 1909
- Cleora acaciaria (Boisduval, 1833)
- Cleora betularia (Warren, 1897)
- Cleora cancer D. S. Fletcher, 1967
- Cleora echinodes D. S. Fletcher, 1967
- Cleora flavivenata D. S. Fletcher, 1967
- Cleora herbuloti D. S. Fletcher, 1967
- Cleora munda (Warren, 1899)
- Cleora nigrisparsalis (Janse, 1932)
- Cleora oligodranes (Prout, 1922)
- Cleora panarista D. S. Fletcher, 1967
- Cleora pavlitzkiae (D. S. Fletcher, 1958)
- Cleora quadrimaculata (Janse, 1932)
- Cleora rothkirchi (Strand, 1914)
- Cleora tulbaghata (Felder & Rogenhofer, 1875)
- Coenina poecilaria (Herrich-Schäffer, 1854)
- Collix foraminata Guenée, 1858
- Colocleora divisaria (Walker, 1860)
- Colocleora faceta (Prout, 1934)
- Colocleora proximaria (Walker, 1860)
- Comibaena leucospilata (Walker, 1863)
- Comostolopsis apicata (Warren, 1898)
- Comostolopsis capensis (Warren, 1899)
- Comostolopsis germana Prout, 1916
- Comostolopsis rubristicta (Warren, 1899)
- Comostolopsis stillata (Felder & Rogenhofer, 1875)
- Conchylia actena Prout, 1917
- Conchylia albata Janse, 1934
- Conchylia canescens (Prout, 1925)
- Conchylia decorata (Warren, 1911)
- Conchylia ditissimaria Guenée, 1858
- Conchylia frosinaria (Stoll, 1790)
- Conchylia gamma Prout, 1915
- Conchylia irene Prout, 1915
- Conchylia lapsicolumna Prout, 1916
- Conchylia nitidula (Stoll, 1782)
- Conchylia nymphula Janse, 1934
- Conchylia pactolaria Wallengren, 1872
- Conchylia rhabdocampa Prout, 1935
- Conchylia sesqsuifascia (Prout, 1913)
- Conchyliodes distelitis Prout, 1930

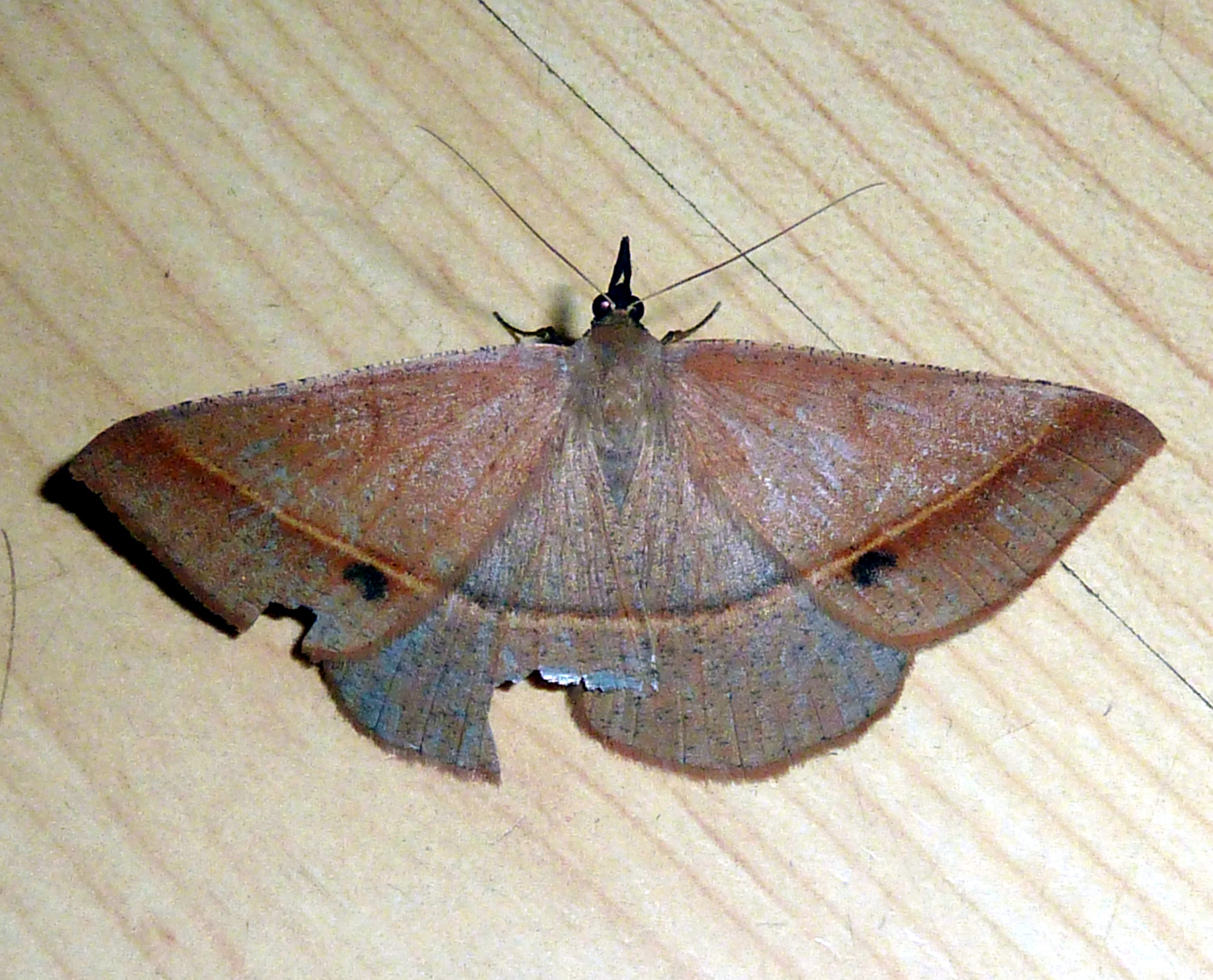
Conolophia aemula

- Conolophia aemula (Warren, 1894)
- Conolophia conscitaria (Walker, 1861)
- Cyclophora lyciscaria (Guenée, 1857)
- Cyclophora sanguinata (Warren, 1904)
- Dichroma equestralis Duncan [& Westwood], 1841
- Diptychis geometrina Felder, 1874
- Disclisioprocta natalata (Walker, 1862)
- Discomiosis arciocentra Prout, 1922
- Discomiosis crescentifera (Warren, 1902)
- Dolosis illacerata Prout, 1912
- Dorsifulcrum xeron Herbulot, 1979

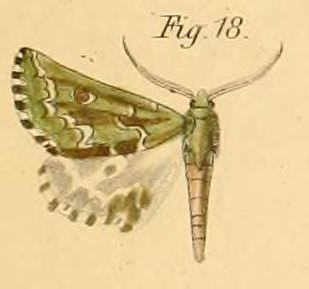
Drepanogynis bifasciata

- Drepanogynis admiranda (Warren, 1905)
- Drepanogynis agrypna (Prout, 1938)
- Drepanogynis albifluxa Krüger, 2002
- Drepanogynis albilinea Krüger, 2002
- Drepanogynis algoaria (Felder & Rogenhofer, 1875)
- Drepanogynis amydrogramma Krüger, 2002
- Drepanogynis angulilinea Krüger, 2002
- Drepanogynis angustifascia Krüger, 2002
- Drepanogynis angustimargo Krüger, 2002
- Drepanogynis antennaria (Guenée, 1858)
- Drepanogynis anthracinata Krüger, 2002
- Drepanogynis arcuatilinea Krüger, 2002
- Drepanogynis arcuifera Prout, 1934
- Drepanogynis argentinitens Krüger, 2002
- Drepanogynis aspitatifax Krüger, 2002
- Drepanogynis athroopsegma Prout, 1925
- Drepanogynis aurifera Krüger, 2002
- Drepanogynis auriferoides Krüger, 2002
- Drepanogynis aurifex Krüger, 2002
- Drepanogynis auriflava Krüger, 2002
- Drepanogynis bifasciata (Dewitz, 1881)
- Drepanogynis bipartita (Warren, 1914)
- Drepanogynis biviaria (Guenée, 1858)
- Drepanogynis breviramus Krüger, 2002
- Drepanogynis brunneisparsa Krüger, 2002
- Drepanogynis calligrapha Krüger, 2002
- Drepanogynis cambogiaria (Guenée, 1858)
- Drepanogynis canilinea (Prout, 1925)
- Drepanogynis carneata (Warren, 1904)
- Drepanogynis chelicerata Krüger, 2002
- Drepanogynis chromatina (Prout, 1913)
- Drepanogynis chrysobates Krüger, 2002
- Drepanogynis circumroda Krüger, 2002
- Drepanogynis climax Krüger, 2002
- Drepanogynis cnephaeogramma (Prout, 1938)
- Drepanogynis commutata (Prout, 1938)
- Drepanogynis confusa Krüger, 2002
- Drepanogynis costipicta (Prout, 1932)
- Drepanogynis curvaria (Dewitz, 1881)
- Drepanogynis curvifascia (Prout, 1916)
- Drepanogynis dami (Prout, 1938)
- Drepanogynis dentatilinea Krüger, 2002
- Drepanogynis dentatimargo Krüger, 2002
- Drepanogynis determinata (Walker, 1860)
- Drepanogynis devia (Prout, 1913)
- Drepanogynis dochmoleuca (Prout, 1917)
- Drepanogynis dukei Krüger, 2002
- Drepanogynis ecprepes Krüger, 2002
- Drepanogynis ectoglauca Krüger, 2002
- Drepanogynis ennomaria (Warren, 1904)
- Drepanogynis epione (Prout, 1913)
- Drepanogynis excurvata Krüger, 2002
- Drepanogynis figurata (Warren, 1905)
- Drepanogynis fortilimbata Prout, 1938
- Drepanogynis fuscimargo (Warren, 1898)
- Drepanogynis glaucichorda Prout, 1916
- Drepanogynis gloriola (Prout, 1913)
- Drepanogynis griseisparsa Krüger, 2002
- Drepanogynis hilaris Krüger, 2002
- Drepanogynis hypenissa (Butler, 1875)
- Drepanogynis hypoplea Prout, 1938
- Drepanogynis inaequalis (Prout, 1915)
- Drepanogynis inangulata (Warren, 1905)
- Drepanogynis incondita (Warren, 1904)
- Drepanogynis incurvata Krüger, 2002
- Drepanogynis insciata (Felder & Rogenhofer, 1875)
- Drepanogynis interscripta (Prout, 1922)
- Drepanogynis intricata (Warren, 1905)
- Drepanogynis intrusilinea Krüger, 2002
- Drepanogynis irvingi Janse, 1932
- Drepanogynis kalahariensis Krüger, 2002
- Drepanogynis lactimacula Krüger, 2002
- Drepanogynis latipennis Krüger, 2002
- Drepanogynis latistriga Krüger, 2002
- Drepanogynis lavata Krüger, 2002
- Drepanogynis leptodoma Prout, 1917
- Drepanogynis longiramus Krüger, 2002
- Drepanogynis micrographa Krüger, 2002
- Drepanogynis miltophyris Krüger, 2002
- Drepanogynis mixtaria Guenée, 1858
- Drepanogynis monas Prout, 1916
- Drepanogynis nebulosa Krüger, 2002
- Drepanogynis neopraefidens Krüger, 2002
- Drepanogynis nigrapex (Prout, 1913)
- Drepanogynis nigrobrunnea Krüger, 2002
- Drepanogynis nipholibes (Prout, 1938)
- Drepanogynis niveata Krüger, 2002
- Drepanogynis obscurefascia Krüger, 2002
- Drepanogynis ocellata Warren, 1897
- Drepanogynis oinophora Krüger, 2002
- Drepanogynis olivescens (Warren, 1898)
- Drepanogynis orthobates (Prout, 1917)
- Drepanogynis ostracina Krüger, 2002
- Drepanogynis pallidimargo Krüger, 2002
- Drepanogynis parapraefidens Krüger, 2002
- Drepanogynis parva Krüger, 2002
- Drepanogynis perirrorata Krüger, 2002
- Drepanogynis pero Prout, 1917
- Drepanogynis phaeoscia Krüger, 2002
- Drepanogynis prouti Krüger, 2002
- Drepanogynis pulla Krüger, 2002
- Drepanogynis pumila Krüger, 2002
- Drepanogynis punctata (Warren, 1897)
- Drepanogynis ravida Krüger, 2002
- Drepanogynis rhodampyx (Prout, 1938)
- Drepanogynis robertsoni (Prout, 1925)
- Drepanogynis rosea Krüger, 2002
- Drepanogynis rufaria (Warren, 1909)
- Drepanogynis rufigrisea (Warren, 1911)
- Drepanogynis sectilis (Prout, 1938)
- Drepanogynis serrifasciaria (Herrich-Schäffer, 1854)
- Drepanogynis simonsi (Prout, 1938)
- Drepanogynis sinuata (Warren, 1905)
- Drepanogynis smaragdaria Krüger, 2002
- Drepanogynis smaragdioides Krüger, 2002
- Drepanogynis soni (Prout, 1938)
- Drepanogynis spatulifurca Krüger, 2002
- Drepanogynis stepheni Krüger, 2002
- Drepanogynis striata Krüger, 2002
- Drepanogynis strigulosa Prout, 1916
- Drepanogynis subochrea (Prout, 1917)
- Drepanogynis synclinia (Prout, 1938)
- Drepanogynis tabacicolor Krüger, 2002
- Drepanogynis trachyacta (Prout, 1922)
- Drepanogynis tripartita (Warren, 1898)
- Drepanogynis valida (Warren, 1914)
- Drepanogynis vara Prout, 1922
- Drepanogynis variciliata Krüger, 2002
- Drepanogynis villaria (Felder & Rogenhofer, 1875)
- Drepanogynis viridipennis Krüger, 2002
- Drepanogynis viridipilosa Krüger, 2002
- Drepanogynis xanthographa Krüger, 2002
- Drepanogynis xylophanes Krüger, 2002
- Durbana setinata (Felder & Rogenhofer, 1875)
- Dysrhoe olbia (Prout, 1911)
- Eccymatoge melanoterma Prout, 1913
- Ecpetala caesiplaga (Prout, 1935)
- Ectropis atelomeres Prout, 1922
- Ectropis delosaria (Walker, 1862)
- Ectropis fraudulenta Janse, 1932
- Ectropis obliquilinea Prout, 1916
- Ectropis paracopa Prout, 1925
- Ectropis simplex (Warren, 1914)
- Ectropis spoliataria (Walker, 1860)
- Ectropis sublimbata (Warren, 1911)
- Elophos barbarica Prout, 1915
- Encoma inaccurata (Prout, 1913)

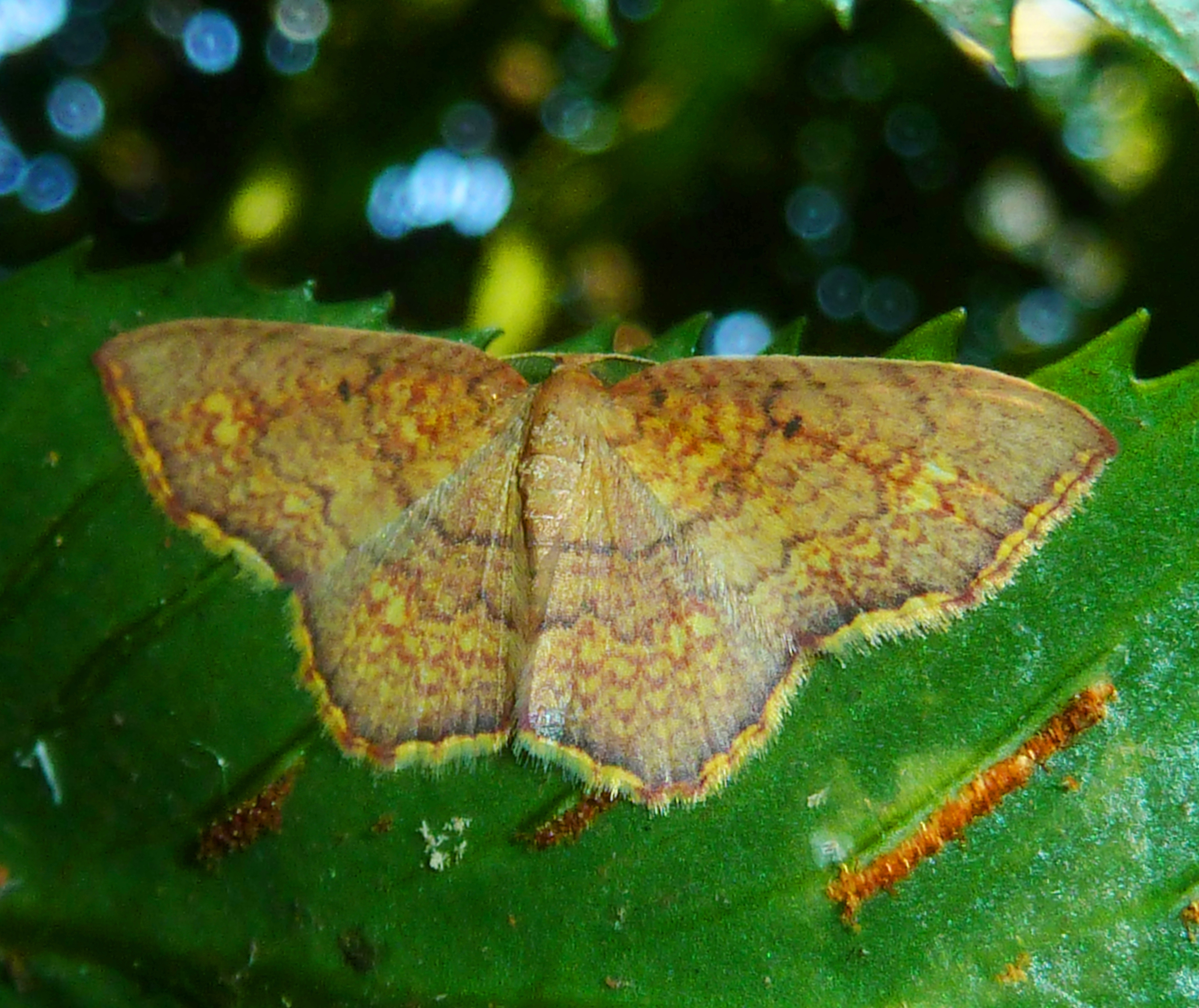
Eois grataria

- Eois grataria (Walker, 1861)
- Eois rectifasciata D. S. Fletcher, 1958
- Epicleta calidaria Prout, 1915
- Epicosymbia dentisignata (Walker, 1863)
- Epicosymbia nitidata (Warren, 1905)
- Epicosymbia perstrigulata (Prout, 1913)
- Epigynopteryx eugonia Prout, 1935
- Epigynopteryx fulva (Warren, 1897)
- Epigynopteryx maeviaria (Guenée, 1858)
- Epigynopteryx ommatoclesis (Prout, 1922)
- Epigynopteryx subspersa (Warren, 1897)
- Epigynopteryx townsendi D. S. Fletcher, 1958
- Epione chalcospilata Walker, 1863
- Epirrhoe annulifera (Warren, 1902)
- Epirrhoe edelsteni Prout, 1916
- Episteira confusidentata (Warren, 1897)
- Erastria albicatena (Warren, 1895)
- Erastria leucicolor (Butler, 1875)
- Erastria madecassaria (Boisduval, 1833)
- Ereunetea reussi Gaede, 1914
- Eucrostes disparata Walker, 1861
- Eucrostes rhodophthalma Prout, 1912
- Eucrostes rufociliaria Herrich-Schäffer, 1855
- Euexia percnopus Prout, 1915
- Eulycia accentuata (Felder & Rogenhofer, 1875)
- Eulycia extorris (Warren, 1904)
- Eulycia grisea (Warren, 1897)
- Eulycia subpunctata (Warren, 1897)
- Euphyia distinctata (Walker, 1862)

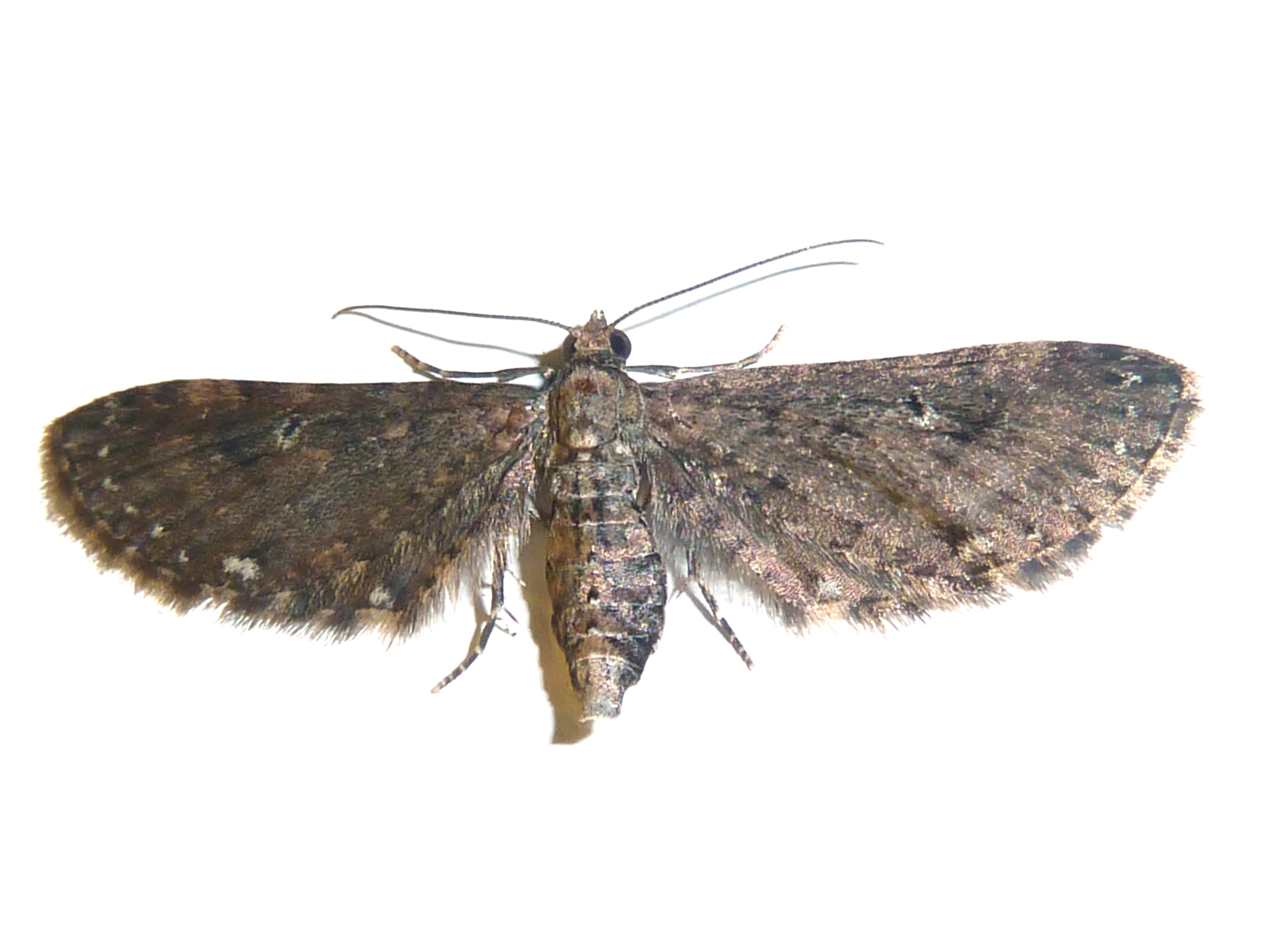
Eupithecia infelix

- Eupithecia albicristulata Prout, 1922
- Eupithecia altitudinis Krüger, 2000
- Eupithecia angustiarum Krüger, 2000
- Eupithecia brachyptera Prout, 1913
- Eupithecia celatisigna (Warren, 1902)
- Eupithecia cinnamomata D. S. Fletcher, 1951
- Eupithecia coaequalis Janse, 1933
- Eupithecia devestita (Warren, 1899)
- Eupithecia festiva Prout, 1916
- Eupithecia gradatilinea Prout, 1916
- Eupithecia hypophasma Prout, 1913
- Eupithecia inconclusaria Walker, 1862
- Eupithecia infausta Prout, 1922
- Eupithecia infectaria (Guenée, 1858)
- Eupithecia infelix Prout, 1917
- Eupithecia inscitata Walker, 1863
- Eupithecia irenica Prout, 1937
- Eupithecia laticallis Prout, 1922
- Eupithecia licita Prout, 1917
- Eupithecia liqalaneng Krüger, 2000
- Eupithecia maloti Krüger, 2000
- Eupithecia mendosaria (Swinhoe, 1904)
- Eupithecia monticola Krüger, 2000
- Eupithecia nigribasis (Warren, 1902)
- Eupithecia perculsaria (Swinhoe, 1904)
- Eupithecia perigrapta Janse, 1933
- Eupithecia pettyi Prout, 1935
- Eupithecia pettyioides Krüger, 2000
- Eupithecia picturata (Warren, 1902)
- Eupithecia polylibades Prout, 1916
- Eupithecia pretoriana (Prout, 1922)
- Eupithecia rediviva Prout, 1917
- Eupithecia reginamontium Krüger, 2000
- Eupithecia regulosa (Warren, 1902)
- Eupithecia rubiginifera Prout, 1913
- Eupithecia sagittata (Warren, 1897)
- Eupithecia subcanipars Prout, 1917
- Eupithecia subconclusaria Prout, 1917
- Eupithecia subscriptaria Prout, 1917
- Eupithecia thessa Prout, 1935
- Eupithecia undiculata Prout, 1932
- Euproutia aggravaria (Guenée, 1858)
- Euproutia rufomarginata (Pagenstecher, 1893)
- Eurranthis acuta (Warren, 1900)
- Eurranthis subfuligata (Walker, 1863)
- Fulvaria striata Fawcett, 1916
- Fynbosia horingaria Englund, et al. 2026
- Fynbosia unicaria Englund, et al. 2026
- Geolyces convexaria (Mabille, 1890)
- Glossotrophia natalensis Prout, 1915
- Gnophos afflictata Walker, 1863
- Gnophos delagardei Prout, 1915
- Gnophos euryta Prout, 1922
- Gnophos rubricimixta Prout, 1915
- Gonanticlea meridionata (Walker, 1862)
- Gymnoscelis olsoufieffae Prout, 1937
- Gymnoscelis oribiensis Herbulot, 1981
- Haplolabida coaequata (Prout, 1935)
- Haplolabida inaequata (Walker, 1861)
- Hebdomophruda apicata Warren, 1897
- Hebdomophruda complicatrix Krüger, 1998
- Hebdomophruda confusatrix Krüger, 1998
- Hebdomophruda crassipuncta Krüger, 1997
- Hebdomophruda crenilinea Prout, 1917
- Hebdomophruda curvilinea Warren, 1897
- Hebdomophruda diploschema Prout, 1915
- Hebdomophruda disconnecta Krüger, 1997
- Hebdomophruda endroedyi Krüger, 1998
- Hebdomophruda errans Prout, 1917
- Hebdomophruda eupitheciata (Warren, 1914)
- Hebdomophruda hamata Krüger, 1997
- Hebdomophruda imitatrix Krüger, 1998
- Hebdomophruda irritatrix Krüger, 1998
- Hebdomophruda kekonimena Krüger, 1997
- Hebdomophruda nigroviridis Krüger, 1997
- Hebdomophruda orhtolinea Krüger, 1998
- Hebdomophruda sculpta Janse, 1932
- Hebdomophruda southeyae Krüger, 1997
- Hebdomophruda tephrinata Krüger, 1997
- Hemistola ereuthopeza Prout, 1925
- Hemistola incommoda Prout, 1912
- Hemistola semialbida Prout, 1912
- Hemixesma anthocrenias Prout, 1922
- Heterorachis despoliata Prout, 1916
- Heterorachis disconotata Prout, 1916
- Heterorachis fuscoterminata Prout, 1915
- Heterorachis gloriola Thierry-Mieg, 1915
- Heterorachis perviridis (Prout, 1912)
- Heterorachis platti Janse, 1935
- Heterorachis simplicissima (Prout, 1912)
- Heterostegane auranticollis Prout, 1922
- Heterostegane bifasciata (Warren, 1914)
- Heterostegane minutissima (Swinhoe, 1904)
- Heterostegane rectistriga Prout, 1913
- Hispophora lechriospilota (Prout, 1922)
- Holoterpna errata Prout, 1922
- Horisme filia Prout, 1913
- Horisme jansei D. S. Fletcher, 1956
- Horisme minuata (Walker, 1860)
- Horisme obscurata Prout, 1913
- Horisme pallidimacula Prout, 1925
- Horisme punctiscripta (Prout, 1917)
- Hypomecis barretti (Prout, 1915)
- Hypomecis complacita (Prout, 1915)
- Hypomecis ectropodes (Prout, 1913)
- Hypomecis gladstonei (Prout, 1922)
- Hypomecis gonophora (Prout, 1916)
- Hypomecis separaria Möschler, 1887
- Hypotephrina confertaria (Warren, 1914)
- Hypotephrina crassidens Krüger, 1998
- Hypotephrina exmotaria (Walker, 1861)
- Hypotephrina minima Krüger, 1998
- Hypotephrina nyangae Krüger, 1998
- Hypotephrina polystriga Krüger, 1998
- Hypotephrina serrimargo Krüger, 1998
- Hypotephrina vicina Krüger, 1998
- Idaea ascepta (Prout, 1915)
- Idaea associata (Warren, 1897)
- Idaea basicostalis (Warren, 1900)
- Idaea carneilinea (Prout, 1922)
- Idaea consericeata (Prout, 1913)
- Idaea controversata (Prout, 1922)
- Idaea draconigena Herbulot, 1981
- Idaea echo (Prout, 1916)
- Idaea fortificata (Prout, 1916)
- Idaea fumilinea (Warren, 1903)
- Idaea hardenbergi Janse, 1935
- Idaea laticlavia (Prout, 1922)
- Idaea leucorrheuma (Prout, 1932)
- Idaea lilliputaria (Warren, 1902)
- Idaea lipara (Prout, 1917)
- Idaea malescripta (Warren, 1897)
- Idaea nasifera (Prout, 1916)
- Idaea nigrosticta (Warren, 1897)
- Idaea ossicolor (Janse, 1935)
- Idaea pericalles (Prout, 1913)
- Idaea plesioscotia (Prout, 1925)
- Idaea prosartema (Herbulot, 1956)
- Idaea pulveraria (Snellen, 1872)
- Idaea punctigera (Janse, 1935)
- Idaea purpurascens (Prout, 1916)
- Idaea rufifascia (Prout, 1916)
- Idaea sinuilinea (Prout, 1913)
- Idaea squamulata (Warren, 1900)
- Idaea sublimbaria (Warren, 1900)
- Idaea subterfundata (Prout, 1922)
- Idaea torrida (Warren, 1904)
- Idaea trissosemia (Prout, 1922)
- Idaea umbricosta (Prout, 1913)
- Idiochlora approximans (Warren, 1897)
- Idiodes saxaria (Guenée, 1858)
- Idiotephra hondensis Krüger, 2000
- Idiotephra ngomensis Krüger, 2000
- Illa nefanda Warren, 1914
- Isoplenia trisinuata Warren, 1897
- Isoplenodia vidalensis Sihvonen & Staude, 2010

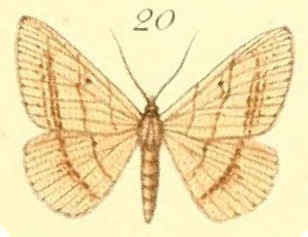
Isturgia catalaunaria

- Isturgia arizeloides Krüger, 2001
- Isturgia catalaunaria (Guenée, 1858)
- Isturgia deerraria (Walker, 1861)
- Isturgia disputaria (Guenée, 1858)
- Isturgia dukuduku Krüger, 2001
- Isturgia exerraria (Prout, 1925)
- Isturgia exospilata (Walker, 1861)
- Isturgia geminata (Warren, 1897)
- Isturgia perplexa Krüger, 2001
- Isturgia spissata (Walker, 1862)
- Isturgia supergressa (Prout, 1913)
- Larentia attenuata (Walker, 1862)
- Larentia bitrita (Felder & Rogenhofer, 1875)
- Larentia diplocampa Prout, 1917
- Larentia indiscriminata Walker, 1863
- Larentioides cacothemon Prout, 1917
- Lasiochlora bicolor (Thierry-Mieg, 1907)
- Lasiochlora diducta (Walker, 1861)
- Leucaniodes periconia Prout, 1922

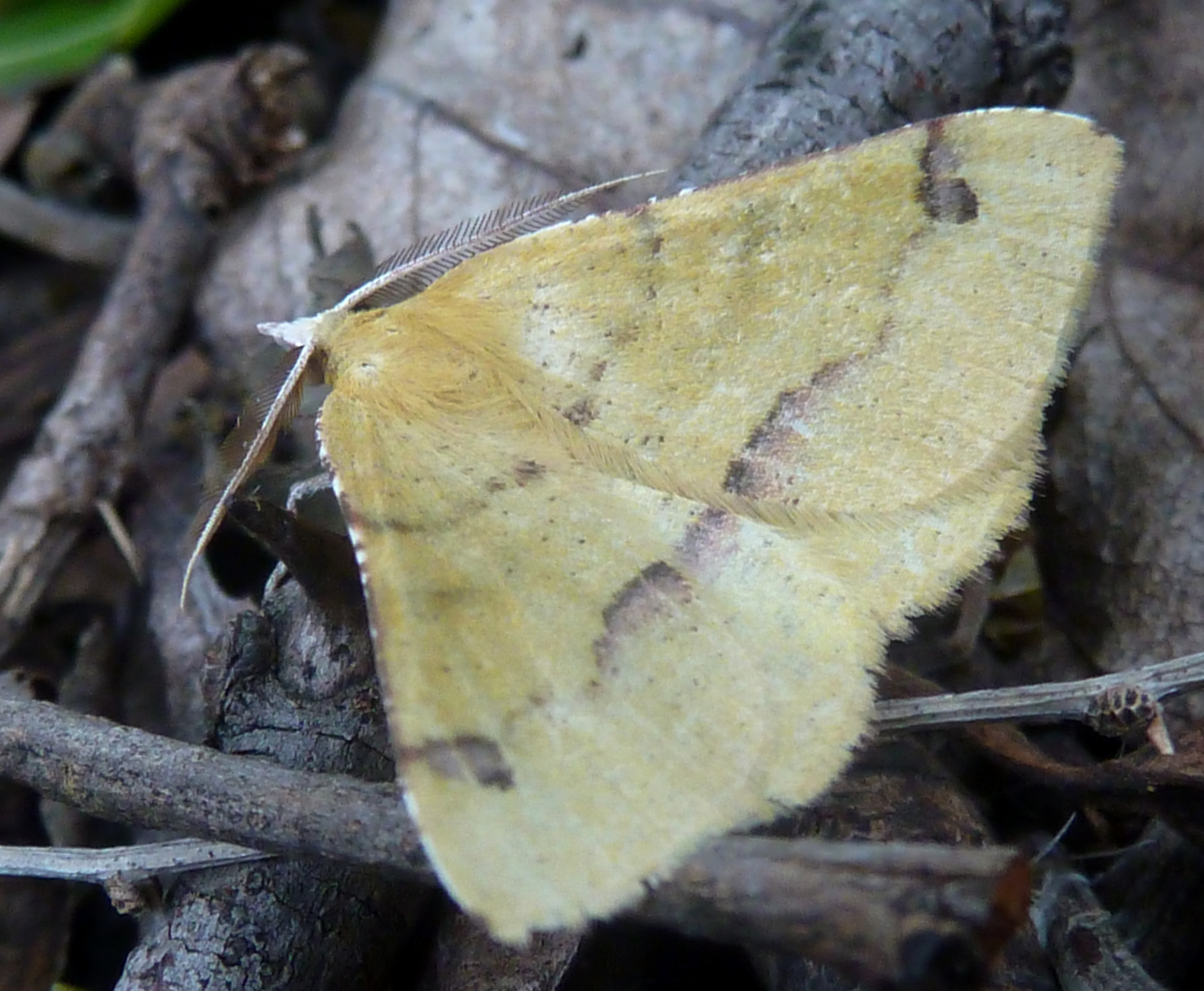
Lhommeia subapicata

- Lhommeia biskraria (Oberthür, 1885)
- Lhommeia subapicata (Warren, 1899)
- Ligdia batesii Wallengren, 1875
- Ligdia interrupta Warren, 1897
- Ligdia pectinicornis Prout, 1913
- Lobidiopteryx eumares Prout, 1935
- Lomographa aridata (Warren, 1897)
- Lomographa indularia (Guenée, 1858)
- Lophostola atridisca (Warren, 1897)
- Loxopora dentilineata Warren, 1914
- Luashia zonata (Walker, 1863)
- Lycaugidia albatus (Swinhoe, 1885)
- Mauna ardescens Prout, 1916
- Mauna ava Prout, 1938
- Mauna drakensbergensis Herbulot, 1992
- Mauna filia (Cramer, 1780)
- Mauna pictifimbria Prout, 1938
- Mauna sematurga Prout, 1938
- Melanthia ustiplaga (Warren, 1899)
- Melinoessa croesaria Herrich-Schäffer, 1855

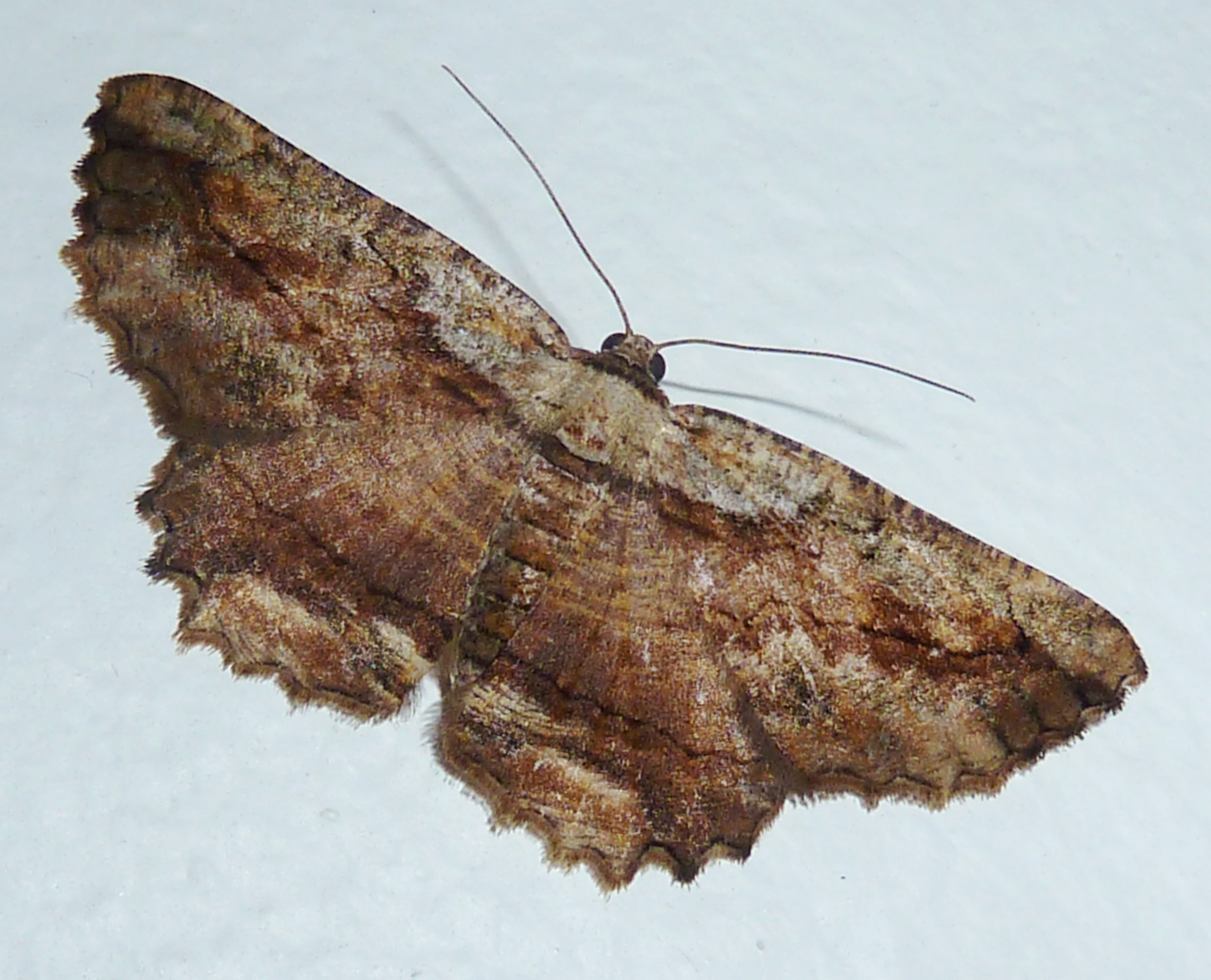
Menophra obtusata

- Menophra absurda (Prout, 1917)
- Menophra caeca (Prout, 1913)
- Menophra contemptaria (Walker, 1860)
- Menophra obtusata (Warren, 1902)
- Menophra serrataria (Walker, 1860)
- Mesocolpia lita (Prout, 1916)
- Mesocolpia nanula (Mabille, 1900)
- Metallochlora dyscheres Prout, 1922
- Metallochlora grisea Prout, 1915
- Miantochora gumppenbergi (Möschler, 1887)
- Microbaena pulchra Staudinger, ????
- Microligia confinis Krüger, 1999
- Microligia dolosa Warren, 1897
- Microligia luteitincta Prout, 1916
- Microligia paradolosa Krüger, 1999
- Microligia pseudodolosa Krüger, 1999
- Microligia septentrionalis Krüger, 1999
- Microloxia ruficornis Warren, 1897
- Mictoschema swierstrai Prout, 1922
- Mictoschema tuckeri Prout, 1925
- Milocera aurora Krüger, 2001
- Milocera dubia (Prout, 1917)
- Mimoclystia explanata (Walker, 1862)
- Mimoclystia mermera (Prout, 1935)
- Mimoclystia pudicata (Walker, 1862)
- Mimoclystia tepescens Prout, 1922
- Mimoclystia undulosata Warren, 1901
- Mixocera albistrigata (Pagenstecher, 1893)
- Mixocera frustratoria (Wallengren, 1863)
- Mixocera parvulata (Walker, 1863)
- Mixocera viridans Prout, 1912
- Mixocera xanthostephana Prout, 1912
- Nassinia caffraria (Linnaeus, 1767)
- Nassinia pretoria Prout, 1916
- Neromia activa Prout, 1930
- Neromia barretti Prout, 1912
- Neromia cohaerens Prout, 1916
- Neromia impostura Prout, 1915
- Neromia phoenicosticta Prout, 1912
- Neromia quieta (Prout, 1912)
- Neromia rhodomadia Prout, 1922
- Neromia rubripunctilla Prout, 1912
- Neromia strigulosa Prout, 1925
- Neurotoca endorhoda Hampson, 1910
- Oaracta auricincta Walker, 1862
- Oaracta neophronaria (Oberthür, 1912)
- Obolcola aliena Prout, 1922
- Obolcola decisa (Warren, 1914)
- Obolcola deocellata Prout, 1913
- Obolcola flavescens Prout, 1913
- Obolcola insecura Janse, 1932
- Obolcola pallida Janse, 1932
- Obolcola petronaria (Guenée, 1858)
- Obolcola pulverea (Prout, 1917)
- Ochroplutodes haturata (Walker, 1860)
- Odontopera erebaria Guenée, 1858
- Odontopera homales (Prout, 1922)
- Odontopera integraria Guenée, 1858
- Odontopera paliscia (Prout, 1922)
- Odontopera perplexata (Warren, 1904)
- Odontopera stictoneura (Prout, 1917)
- Oedicentra albipennis Warren, 1902
- Omizodes complanata Prout, 1922
- Omizodes ocellata Warren, 1894
- Omphacodes delicata (Warren, 1905)
- Omphacodes punctilineata (Warren, 1897)
- Omphacodes vivida (Warren, 1899)
- Omphalucha albosignata Janse, 1932
- Omphalucha angulilinea (Janse, 1932)
- Omphalucha apira Prout, 1938
- Omphalucha crenulata (Warren, 1897)
- Omphalucha ditriba Prout, 1938
- Omphalucha exocholoxa Prout, 1938
- Omphalucha indeflexa Prout, 1922
- Omphalucha katangae Prout, 1934
- Omphalucha maturnaria (Möschler, 1883)
- Omphalucha praeses Prout, 1938
- Omphax bacoti Prout, 1912
- Omphax bilobata Janse, 1935
- Omphax idonea Prout, 1916
- Omphax leucocraspeda Prout, 1912
- Omphax modesta (Warren, 1897)
- Omphax plantaria Guenée, 1858
- Omphax rhodocera (Hampson, 1910)
- Omphax shorti Prout, 1912
- Omphax trilobata Janse, 1935
- Omphax vicinitaria (Wallengren, 1863)

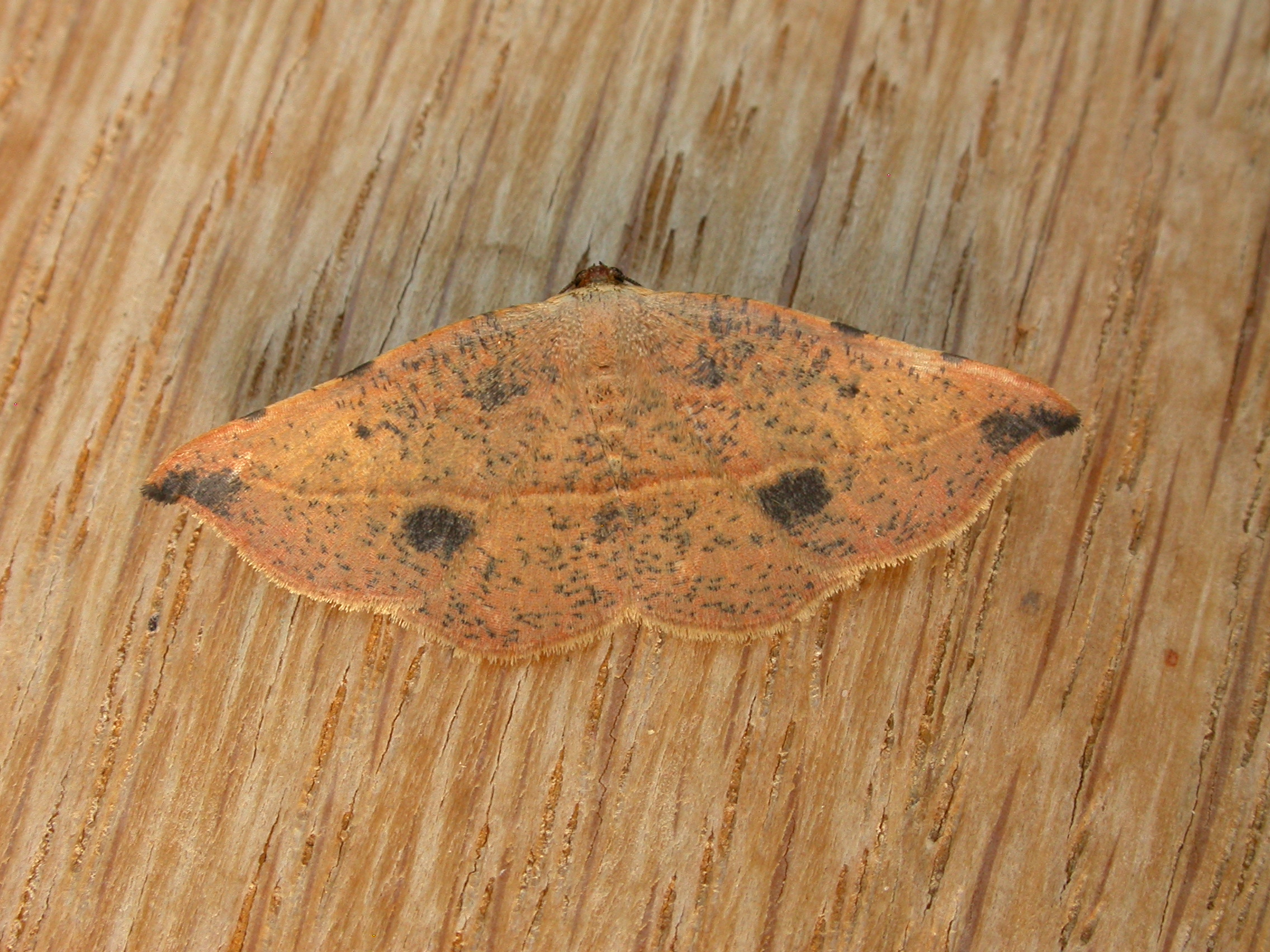
Onycodes traumataria

- Onycodes traumataria Guenée, 1858
- Orbamia octomaculata (Wallengren, 1872)
- Orgyiodes caparia (Walker, 1862)
- Orthonama obstipata (Fabricius, 1794)
- Ozola pulverulenta Warren, 1897
- Pachycnemoides basutensis Krüger, 1999
- Pachycnemoides inops Krüger, 1999
- Pachycnemoides minor Krüger, 1999
- Pachycnemoides obfuscata Krüger, 1999
- Pachycnemoides zonaria Krüger, 1999
- Palaeaspilates carnea (Warren, 1914)
- Palaeaspilates inoffensa Warren, 1894
- Palaeonyssia trisecta (Warren, 1897)
- Panagropsis equitaria (Walker, 1861)
- Panagropsis muricolor (Warren, 1897)
- Paraprasina discolor Warren, 1897
- Pareclipsis distolochorda Prout, 1916
- Pareclipsis incerta Prout, 1916
- Pareclipsis leptophyes Prout, 1916
- Pareclipsis ochrea (Warren, 1905)
- Pareclipsis onus Prout, 1917
- Pareclipsis oxyptera Prout, 1916
- Pareclipsis phaeopis Prout, 1922
- Pareclipsis punctata Warren, 1900
- Parortholitha moerdyki Herbulot, 1980
- Parortholitha subrectiaria (Walker, 1861)
- Perizoma africana (Warren, 1911)
- Perizoma alumna (Prout, 1925)
- Perizoma artifex Prout, 1925
- Perizoma epipercna (Prout, 1913)
- Perizoma eviscerata Warren, 1914
- Perizoma lamprammodes (Prout, 1911)
- Perizoma petrogenes (Prout, 1922)
- Perusiopsis veninotata Warren, 1914
- Petovia marginata Walker, 1854

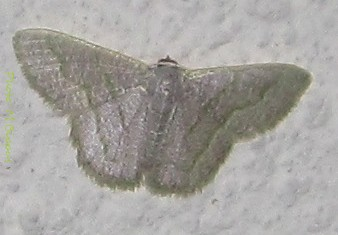
Phaiogramma stibolepida

- Phaiogramma stibolepida (Butler, 1879)
- Phoenicocampa terinata (Felder & Rogenhofer, 1875)
- Phthonandria pinguis (Warren, 1904)
- Piercia bryophilaria (Warren, 1903)
- Piercia cidariata (Guenée, 1858)
- Piercia ciliata Janse, 1933
- Piercia dibola Prout, 1935
- Piercia dryas (Prout, 1915)
- Piercia emmeles (Prout, 1922)
- Piercia leptophyes Prout, 1935
- Piercia lightfooti (Prout, 1925)
- Piercia nimipunctata Janse, 1933
- Piercia olivata Janse, 1933
- Piercia perizomoides (Prout, 1916)
- Piercia prasinaria (Warren, 1901)
- Piercia respondens (Prout, 1922)
- Piercia smaragdinata (Walker, 1862)
- Piercia spatiosata (Walker, 1862)
- Piercia subterlimbata (Prout, 1917)
- Piercia vittata Janse, 1933
- Pigiopsis aurantiaca Carcasson, 1964

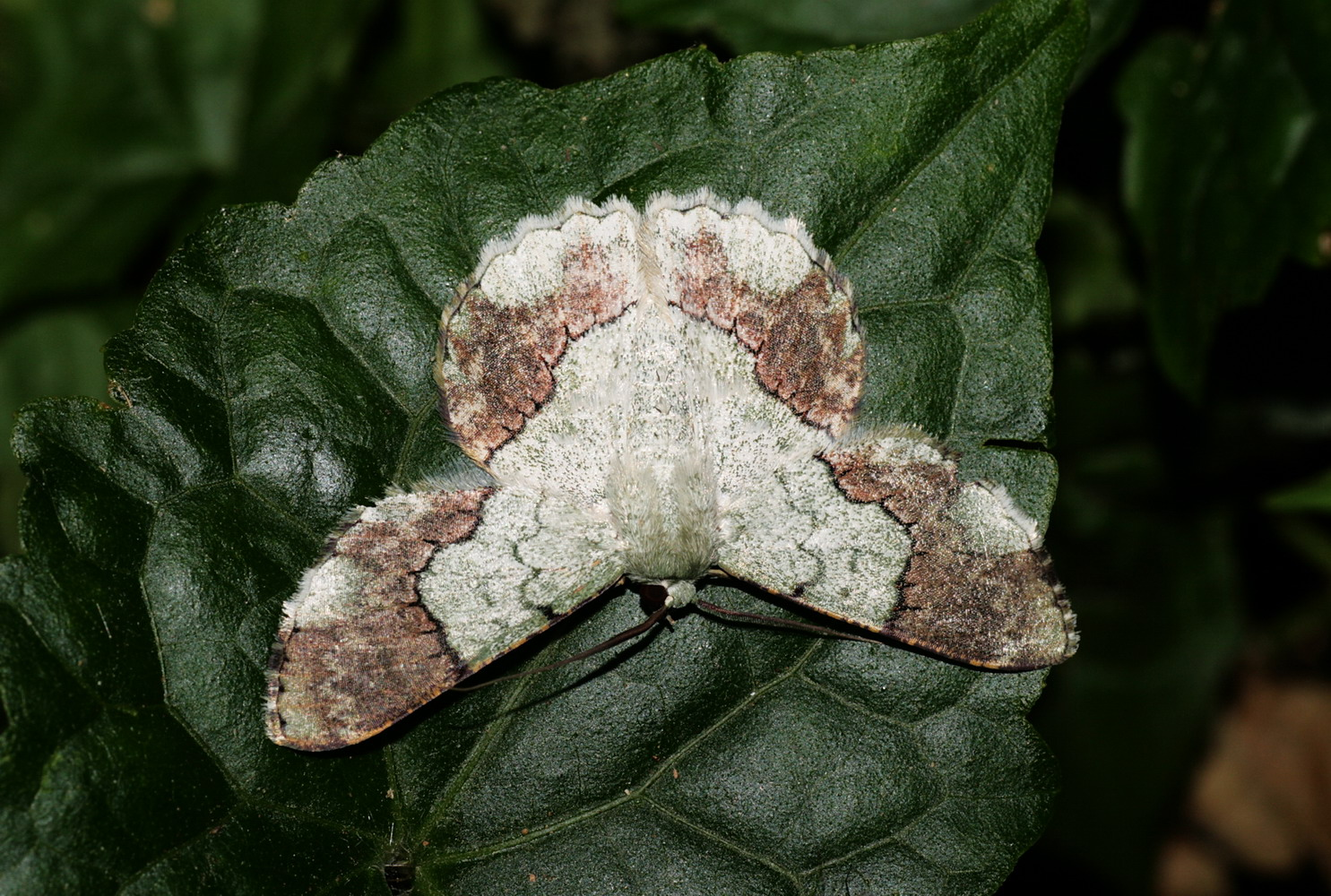
Pingasa ruginaria

- Pingasa abyssiniaria (Guenée, 1858)
- Pingasa distensaria (Walker, 1860)
- Pingasa rhadamaria (Guenée, 1858)
- Pingasa ruginaria (Guenée, 1858)
- Plateoplia acrobelia (Wallengren, 1875)
- Platypepla flava Krüger, 2001
- Platypepla griseobrunnea Krüger, 2001
- Platypepla jordani Krüger, 2001
- Platypepla loranthiphaga Krüger, 2001
- Platypepla macilenta Krüger, 2001
- Platypepla mackayi Krüger, 2001
- Platypepla persubtilis Krüger, 2001
- Platypepla pseudospurcata Krüger, 2001
- Platypepla spurcata (Warren, 1897)
- Plegapteryx anomalus Herrich-Schäffer, 1856
- Polystroma subspissata Warren, 1897
- Prasinocyma albisticta (Warren, 1901)
- Prasinocyma bifimbriata Prout, 1912
- Prasinocyma bilobata D. S. Fletcher, 1978
- Prasinocyma chloroprosopa Prout, 1913
- Prasinocyma dorsipuntata Warren, 1911
- Prasinocyma germinaria (Guenée, 1858)
- Prasinocyma hadrata (Felder & Rogenhofer, 1875)
- Prasinocyma immaculata (Thunberg, 1784)
- Prasinocyma inversicaulis Prout, 1913
- Prasinocyma neglecta Prout, 1921
- Prasinocyma niveisticta Prout, 1912
- Prasinocyma panchlora Prout, 1913
- Prasinocyma pictifimbria Warren, 1904
- Prasinocyma pulchraria Swinhoe, 1904
- Prasinocyma pupillata (Warren, 1902)
- Prasinocyma unipuncta Warren, 1897
- Prasinocyma vermicularia (Guenée, 1858)
- Problepsis aegretta Felder & Rogenhofer, 1875
- Problepsis digammata Kirby, 1896
- Problepsis latonaria (Guenée, 1858)
- Prosomphax callista Warren, 1911
- Prosomphax deuterurga Prout, 1922
- Protosteira spectabilis (Warren, 1899)
- Proutiana ferrorubrata (Walker, 1863)
- Proutiana perconspersa (Prout, 1915)
- Pseudolarentia megalaria (Guenée, 1858)
- Pseudomaenas alcidata (Felder & Rogenhofer, 1875)
- Pseudomaenas anguinata (Felder & Rogenhofer, 1875)
- Pseudomaenas arcuata Krüger, 1999
- Pseudomaenas bivirgata (Felder & Rogenhofer, 1875)
- Pseudomaenas complicata Krüger, 1999
- Pseudomaenas directa Krüger, 1999
- Pseudomaenas dukei Krüger, 1999
- Pseudomaenas eumetrorrhoabda Prout, 1938
- Pseudomaenas euzonaria Krüger, 1999
- Pseudomaenas honiballi Krüger, 1999
- Pseudomaenas intricata (Walker, 1858)
- Pseudomaenas krooni Krüger, 1999
- Pseudomaenas leucograpta (Warren, 1911)
- Pseudomaenas margarita (Warren, 1914)
- Pseudomaenas oncodogramma Prout, 1917
- Pseudomaenas orophila Krüger, 1999
- Pseudomaenas prominens Krüger, 1999
- Pseudomaenas sinuata Krüger, 1999
- Pseudomaenas staudei Krüger, 1999
- Pseudomaenas tricolor (Warren, 1897)
- Pseudomaenas turneri Prout, 1938
- Psilocerea immitata Janse, 1932
- Psilocerea leptosyne D. S. Fletcher, 1978
- Psilocerea pulverosa (Warren, 1894)
- Psilocladia obliquata Warren, 1898

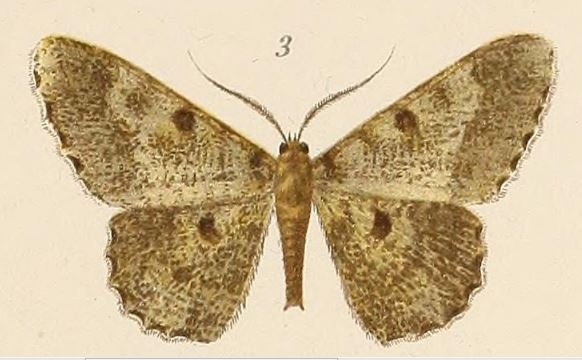
Racotis squalida

- Racotis apodosima Prout, 1931
- Racotis breijeri (Prout, 1922)
- Racotis incauta (Prout, 1916)
- Racotis squalida (Butler, 1878)
- Racotis zebrina Warren, 1899
- Rhadinomphax divincta (Walker, 1861)
- Rhadinomphax pudicata (Walker, 1866)
- Rhadinomphax sanguinipuncta (Felder & Rogenhofer, 1875)
- Rhadinomphax trimeni (Felder & Rogenhofer, 1875)
- Rhodesia alboviridata (Saalmüller, 1880)
- Rhodesia depompata Prout, 1913
- Rhodesia viridalbata Warren, 1905
- Rhodometra participata (Walker, 1862)
- Rhodometra sacraria (Linnaeus, 1767)
- Rhodometra satura Prout, 1916
- Rhodophthitus atacta Prout, 1922
- Rhodophthitus atricoloraria (Mabille, 1890)
- Rhodophthitus commaculata (Warren, 1897)
- Scardamia maculata Warren, 1897

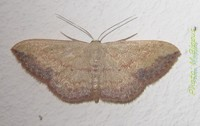
Scopula caesaria

- Scopula accentuata (Guenée, 1858)
- Scopula acentra (Warren, 1897)
- Scopula antiloparia (Wallengren, 1863)
- Scopula argyroleuca (Hampson, 1910)
- Scopula astrabes Prout, 1932
- Scopula bigeminata (Warren, 1897)
- Scopula caesaria (Walker, 1861)
- Scopula carnosa Prout, 1925
- Scopula circumpunctata (Warren, 1898)
- Scopula demissaria (Walker, 1863)
- Scopula derasata (Walker, 1863)
- Scopula deserta (Warren, 1897)
- Scopula dissonans (Warren, 1897)
- Scopula donovani (Distant, 1892)
- Scopula duplicipuncta (Prout, 1913)
- Scopula erinaria (Swinhoe, 1904)
- Scopula euchroa Prout, 1925
- Scopula fimbrilineata (Warren, 1902)
- Scopula flexio Prout, 1917
- Scopula gazellaria (Wallengren, 1863)
- Scopula gnou Herbulot, 1985
- Scopula hectata (Guenée, 1858)
- Scopula impicta Prout, 1922
- Scopula inscriptata (Walker, 1863)
- Scopula insincera Prout, 1920
- Scopula instructata (Walker, 1863)
- Scopula internata (Guenée, 1857)
- Scopula internataria (Walker, 1861)
- Scopula irrufata (Warren, 1905)
- Scopula lactaria (Walker, 1861)
- Scopula laevipennis (Warren, 1897)
- Scopula latitans Prout, 1920
- Scopula ludibunda (Prout, 1915)
- Scopula minorata (Boisduval, 1833)
- Scopula molaris Prout, 1922
- Scopula monotropa Prout, 1925
- Scopula natalica (Butler, 1875)
- Scopula nemorivagata (Wallengren, 1863)

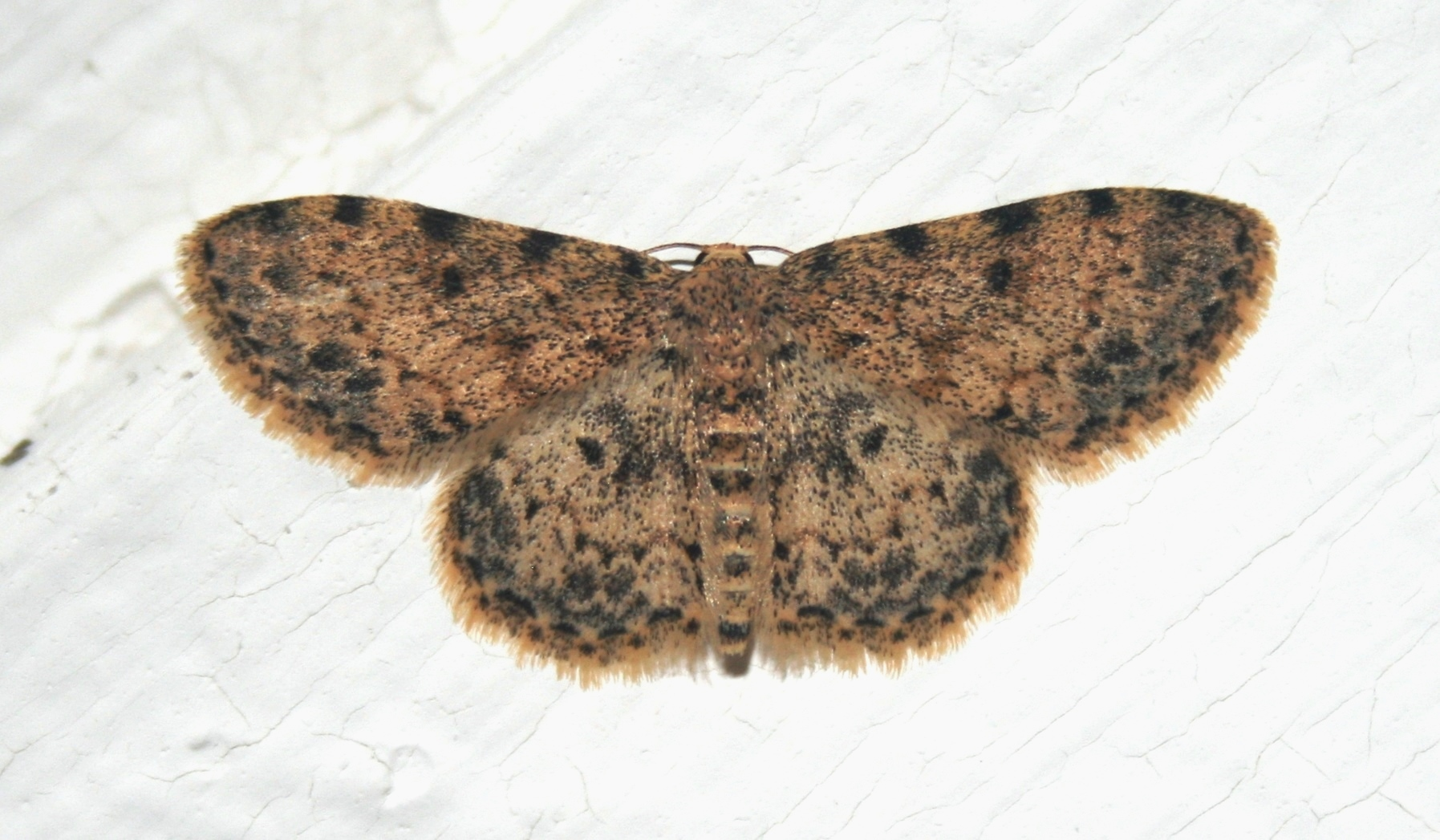
Scopula nigrinotata

- Scopula nigrinotata (Warren, 1897)
- Scopula obliquiscripta (Warren, 1897)
- Scopula opicata (Fabricius, 1798)
- Scopula opperta Prout, 1920
- Scopula oryx Herbulot, 1985
- Scopula ourebi Herbulot, 1985
- Scopula palleuca Prout, 1925
- Scopula palpifera Prout, 1925
- Scopula pelloniodes Prout, 1922
- Scopula pertinax (Prout, 1916)
- Scopula phyletis (Prout, 1913)
- Scopula picta (Warren, 1897)
- Scopula promethes Prout, 1928
- Scopula psephis Prout, 1935
- Scopula punctilineata (Warren, 1897)
- Scopula quadrifasciata (Bastelberger, 1909)
- Scopula quintaria (Prout, 1916)
- Scopula rossi (Prout, 1913)
- Scopula ruficolor (Prout, 1916)
- Scopula rufisalsa (Warren, 1897)
- Scopula sanguinisecta (Warren, 1897)
- Scopula sarcodes Prout, 1935
- Scopula serena Prout, 1920
- Scopula spoliata (Walker, 1861)
- Scopula straminea (Felder & Rogenhofer, 1875)
- Scopula sublobata (Warren, 1898)
- Scopula subobliquata (Prout, 1913)
- Scopula tenuiscripta Prout, 1917
- Scopula zophodes Prout, 1935
- Scotopteryx albiclausa (Warren, 1897)
- Scotopteryx atrosigillata (Walker, 1863)
- Scotopteryx crenulimargo (Prout, 1925)
- Scotopteryx cryptocycla (Prout, 1913)
- Scotopteryx cryptospilata (Walker, 1863)
- Scotopteryx deversa (Prout, 1913)
- Scotopteryx ferridotata (Walker, 1863)
- Scotopteryx horismodes (Prout, 1913)
- Scotopteryx nictitaria (Herrich-Schäffer, 1855)
- Scotopteryx peringueyi (Prout, 1917)
- Semiothisa destitutaria (Walker, 1861)
- Semiothisa deviaria (Walker, 1863)
- Semiothisa infixaria (Walker, 1863)
- Semiothisa latiscriptata (Walker, 1863)
- Sesquialtera ramecourti Herbulot, 1967
- Sesquialtera ridicula Prout, 1916
- Somatina centrophora Prout, 1915
- Somatina ctenophora Prout, 1915
- Somatina figurata Warren, 1897
- Somatina mozambica (Thierry-Mieg, 1905)
- Somatina prouti Janse, 1934
- Somatina pythiaria (Guenée, 1858)
- Somatina sedata Prout, 1922
- Somatina vestalis (Butler, 1875)
- Somatina virginalis Prout, 1917
- Syncollesis trilineata (Hampson, 1910)

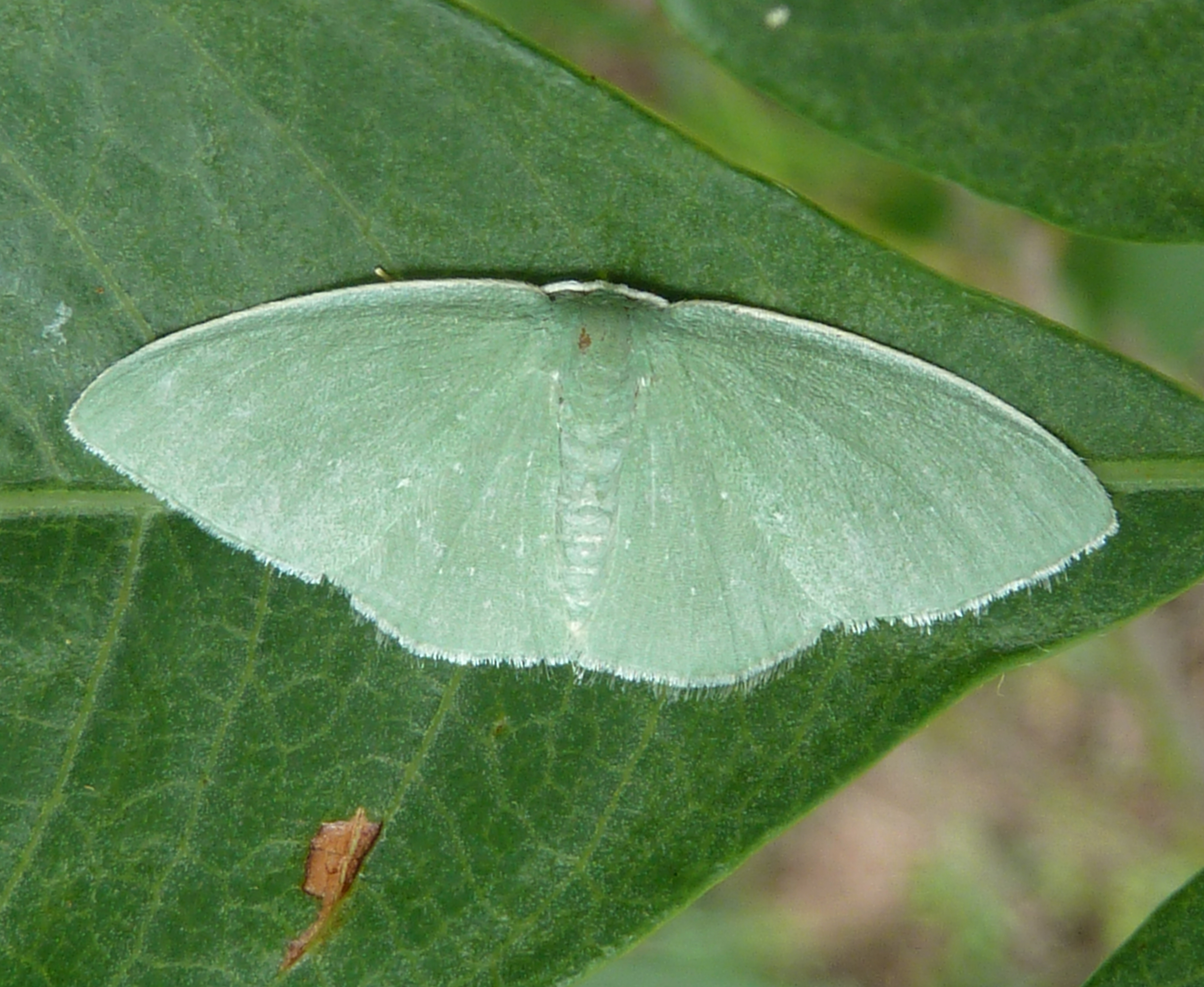
Syndromodes invenusta

- Syndromodes cellulata Warren, 1898
- Syndromodes dimensa (Walker, 1861)
- Syndromodes invenusta (Wallengren, 1863)
- Syndromodes oedocnemis Prout, 1922
- Syndromodes prasinops Prout, 1930
- Terina circumcincta Prout, 1915
- Thalassodes quadraria Guenée, 1857
- Thelycera hemithales (Prout, 1912)
- Traminda acuta (Warren, 1897)
- Traminda falcata Warren, 1897
- Traminda neptunaria (Guenée, 1858)
- Traminda obversata (Walker, 1861)
- Traminda ocellata Warren, 1895
- Traminda vividaria (Walker, 1861)
- Veniliodes inflammata Warren, 1894
- Veniliodes pantheraria (Felder, 1874)
- Victoria albipicta Warren, 1897
- Victoria fuscithorax Warren, 1905
- Victoria rhodoblemma Prout, 1938
- Xanthisthisa niveifrons (Prout, 1922)
- Xanthorhoe albodivisaria (Aurivillius, 1910)
- Xanthorhoe braunsi Janse, 1933
- Xanthorhoe exorista Prout, 1922
- Xanthorhoe melissaria (Guenée, 1858)
- Xanthorhoe mimica Janse, 1933
- Xanthorhoe poseata (Geyer, 1837)
- Xanthorhoe transjugata Prout, 1923
- Xenimpia erosa Warren, 1895
- Xenimpia lactesignata (Warren, 1914)
- Xenimpia maculosata (Warren, 1897)
- Xenimpia trizonata (Saalmüller, 1891)
- Xenochlorodes xina Prout, 1916
- Xenochroma candidata Warren, 1902
- Xenochroma dyschlorata (Warren, 1914)
- Xenochroma planimargo Prout, 1912
- Xenochroma roseimargo Janse, 1935

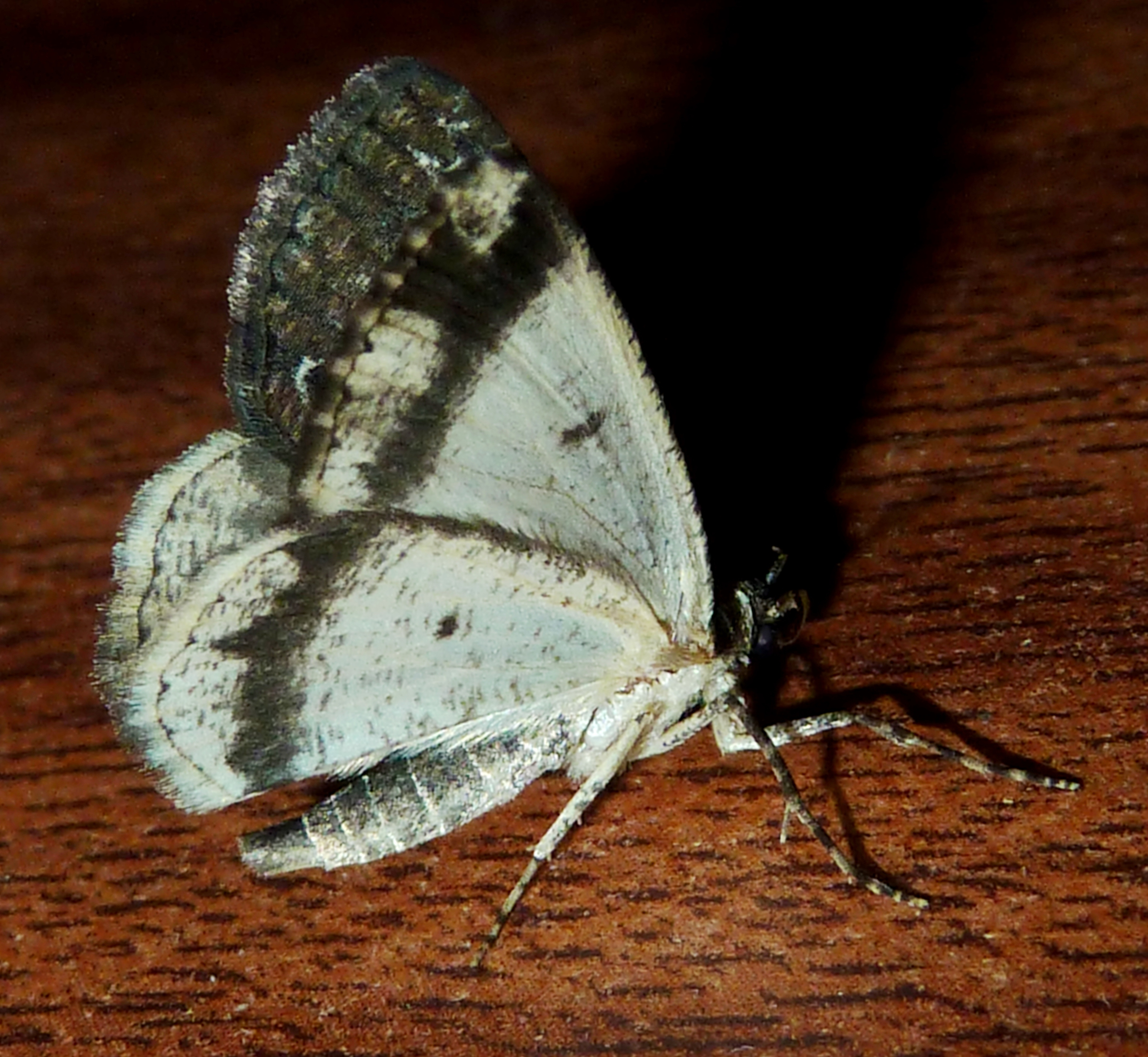
Xylopteryx

- Xylopteryx arcuata (Walker, 1862)
- Xylopteryx prasinaria Hampson, 1909
- Xylopteryx protearia Guenée, 1858
- Zamarada adiposata (Felder & Rogenhofer, 1875)
- Zamarada ascaphes Prout, 1925
- Zamarada consecuta Prout, 1922
- Zamarada deceptrix Warren, 1914
- Zamarada dentigera Warren, 1909
- Zamarada differens Bastelberger, 1907
- Zamarada erugata D. S. Fletcher, 1974
- Zamarada glareosa Bastelberger, 1909
- Zamarada ilma Prout, 1922
- Zamarada inermis D. S. Fletcher, 1974
- Zamarada metallicata Warren, 1914
- Zamarada metrioscaphes Prout, 1912
- Zamarada ordinaria Bethune-Baker, 1913
- Zamarada phaeozona Hampson, 1909
- Zamarada plana Bastelberger, 1909
- Zamarada pulverosa Warren, 1895
- Zamarada transvisaria (Guenée, 1858)
- Zamarada varii D. S. Fletcher, 1974
- Zerenopsis lepida (Walker, 1854)
- Zeuctoboarmia cataimena (Prout, 1915)
- Zeuctoboarmia hyrax (Townsend, 1952)
- Zeuctoboarmia octopunctata (Warren, 1897)
- Zygophyxia stenoptila Prout, 1916
