= Molaris =

Molaris may refer to:

- Molaris (software), a software using the empirical valence bond approach to calculate free energies of enzymatic reactions
- Dens molaris, a Latin expression for designing the molar (tooth)
- Chomatodus molaris, a prehistoric fish in genus Chomatodus
- Scopula molaris, a moth in the family Geomitridae
