= Eupithecia pettyioides =

Scientific classification
- Kingdom: Animalia
- Phylum: Arthropoda
- Clade: Pancrustacea
- Class: Insecta
- Order: Lepidoptera
- Family: Geometridae
- Genus: Eupithecia
- Species: E. pettyioides

Binomial name
- Eupithecia pettyioides Krüger, 1999/2000

Species of moth

Eupithecia pettyioides is a moth in the family Geometridae. It is found in Lesotho and South Africa. The specific name pettyioides refers to its similarity to Eupithecia pettyi.

The forewing length is 9–11 mm (0.35–0.43 in) for males and 10 mm (0.39 in) for males.
