= Scopula zophodes =

Scientific classification
- Domain: Eukaryota
- Kingdom: Animalia
- Phylum: Arthropoda
- Class: Insecta
- Order: Lepidoptera
- Family: Geometridae
- Genus: Scopula
- Species: S. zophodes

Binomial name
- Scopula zophodes L. B. Prout, 1935

Species of geometer moth in subfamily Sterrhinae

Scopula zophodes is a moth of the family Geometridae first described by Louis Beethoven Prout in 1935. It is found in South Africa.

== See also ==
- List of moths of South Africa (Geometridae)

== Bibliography ==
- Vári, L.; Kroon, D. M. & Krüger, M. (2002). Classification and Checklist of the Species of Lepidoptera Recorded in Southern Africa. Simple Solutions, Chatswood Australia.
