= Eupithecia thessa =

Scientific classification
- Kingdom: Animalia
- Phylum: Arthropoda
- Clade: Pancrustacea
- Class: Insecta
- Order: Lepidoptera
- Family: Geometridae
- Genus: Eupithecia
- Species: E. thessa

Binomial name
- Eupithecia thessa L. B. Prout, 1935

Species of moth

Eupithecia thessa is a moth in the family Geometridae. It is found in South Africa.
