= Eupithecia angustiarum =

Scientific classification
- Kingdom: Animalia
- Phylum: Arthropoda
- Clade: Pancrustacea
- Class: Insecta
- Order: Lepidoptera
- Family: Geometridae
- Genus: Eupithecia
- Species: E. angustiarum

Binomial name
- Eupithecia angustiarum Krüger, 1999/2000

Species of moth

Eupithecia angustiarum is a moth in the family Geometridae. It is found in Lesotho and South Africa. The specific name angustiarum is derived from Latin angustiae for "narrowness" and refers to its type locality, the Pass of Guns, a mountain pass in the Maloti Mountains.

The forewing length is 10–11 mm (0.39–0.43 in) for males.
