= Scopula circumpunctata =

Scientific classification
- Domain: Eukaryota
- Kingdom: Animalia
- Phylum: Arthropoda
- Class: Insecta
- Order: Lepidoptera
- Family: Geometridae
- Genus: Scopula
- Species: S. circumpunctata

Binomial name
- Scopula circumpunctata (Warren, 1898)

Synonyms
- Craspedia circumpunctata Warren, 1898

Species of geometer moth in subfamily Sterrhinae

Scopula circumpunctata is a moth of the family Geometridae. It was described by Warren in 1898. It is endemic to South Africa.
