= Scopula derasata =

Scientific classification
- Domain: Eukaryota
- Kingdom: Animalia
- Phylum: Arthropoda
- Class: Insecta
- Order: Lepidoptera
- Family: Geometridae
- Genus: Scopula
- Species: S. derasata

Binomial name
- Scopula derasata (Walker, [1863])

Synonyms
- Acidalia derasata Walker 1863

Species of geometer moth in subfamily Sterrhinae

Scopula derasata is a moth of the family Geometridae. It is endemic to South Africa.

== Taxonomy ==
This species is possibly only an aberration of Scopula minorata described by Jean Baptiste Boisduval in 1833.
