= Eupithecia polylibades =

Scientific classification
- Kingdom: Animalia
- Phylum: Arthropoda
- Clade: Pancrustacea
- Class: Insecta
- Order: Lepidoptera
- Family: Geometridae
- Genus: Eupithecia
- Species: E. polylibades

Binomial name
- Eupithecia polylibades L. B. Prout, 1916

Species of moth

Eupithecia polylibades is a moth in the family Geometridae. It is found in South Africa, Lesotho, and Eswatini.

The forewing length is 10–12 mm (0.39–0.47 in) for males and 11 mm (0.43 in) for females.
