= Scopula straminea =

Scientific classification
- Domain: Eukaryota
- Kingdom: Animalia
- Phylum: Arthropoda
- Class: Insecta
- Order: Lepidoptera
- Family: Geometridae
- Genus: Scopula
- Species: S. straminea

Binomial name
- Scopula straminea (Felder & Rogenhofer, 1875)

Synonyms
- Acidalia straminea Felder & Rogenhofer, 1875; Craspedia melliflua Warren, 1897; Acidalia melliflua ab. sumpta Prout, 1913

Species of geometer moth in subfamily Sterrhinae

Scopula straminea is a moth of the family Geometridae. It is found in South Africa.
