= Scopula opperta =

Scientific classification
- Domain: Eukaryota
- Kingdom: Animalia
- Phylum: Arthropoda
- Class: Insecta
- Order: Lepidoptera
- Family: Geometridae
- Genus: Scopula
- Species: S. opperta

Binomial name
- Scopula opperta Prout, 1920

Species of geometer moth in subfamily Sterrhinae

Scopula opperta is a moth of the family Geometridae. It is found in South Africa and Eswatini.

The wingspan is 24–28 mm (0.94–1.10 in).
