= Scopula stenoptila =

Scientific classification
- Kingdom: Animalia
- Phylum: Arthropoda
- Clade: Pancrustacea
- Class: Insecta
- Order: Lepidoptera
- Family: Geometridae
- Genus: Scopula
- Species: S. stenoptila

Binomial name
- Scopula stenoptila (L. B. Prout, 1916)

Synonyms
- Zygophyxia stenoptila Prout, 1916

Species of geometer moth in subfamily Sterrhinae

Scopula stenoptila is a moth of the family Geometridae. It is found in South Africa.
