= Eupithecia pretoriana =

Scientific classification
- Kingdom: Animalia
- Phylum: Arthropoda
- Clade: Pancrustacea
- Class: Insecta
- Order: Lepidoptera
- Family: Geometridae
- Genus: Eupithecia
- Species: E. pretoriana

Binomial name
- Eupithecia pretoriana (Prout L.B., 1922)

Synonyms
- Eucymatoge pretoriana Prout, 1922

Species of moth

Eupithecia pretoriana is a moth in the family Geometridae. It is found in South Africa.
