= Eupithecia cinnamomata =

Scientific classification
- Domain: Eukaryota
- Kingdom: Animalia
- Phylum: Arthropoda
- Class: Insecta
- Order: Lepidoptera
- Family: Geometridae
- Genus: Eupithecia
- Species: E. cinnamomata

Binomial name
- Eupithecia cinnamomata D. S. Fletcher, 1951

Species of moth

Eupithecia cinnamomata is a moth in the family Geometridae. It was described by David Stephen Fletcher in 1951 and it is found in South Africa.
