= Eupithecia albicristulata =

Scientific classification
- Kingdom: Animalia
- Phylum: Arthropoda
- Clade: Pancrustacea
- Class: Insecta
- Order: Lepidoptera
- Family: Geometridae
- Genus: Eupithecia
- Species: E. albicristulata

Binomial name
- Eupithecia albicristulata Prout L.B., 1922

Species of moth

Eupithecia albicristulata is a moth in the family Geometridae. It is found in South Africa.
