= Eupithecia infectaria =

Scientific classification
- Kingdom: Animalia
- Phylum: Arthropoda
- Clade: Pancrustacea
- Class: Insecta
- Order: Lepidoptera
- Family: Geometridae
- Genus: Eupithecia
- Species: E. infectaria

Binomial name
- Eupithecia infectaria (Guenée, 1858)

Synonyms
- Lepiodes infectaria Guenee, 1857

Species of moth

Eupithecia infectaria is a moth in the family Geometridae. It is found in South Africa and Lesotho.

The forewing length is 13–14 mm (0.51–0.55 in) for males and 14–15 mm (0.55–0.59 in) for females, which make it the largest member of its genus in southern Africa.
