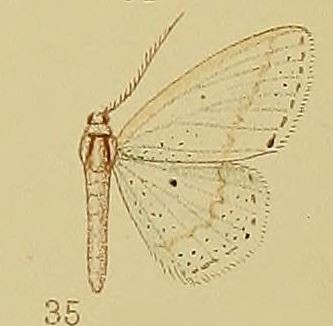

Scientific classification
- Domain: Eukaryota
- Kingdom: Animalia
- Phylum: Arthropoda
- Class: Insecta
- Order: Lepidoptera
- Family: Geometridae
- Genus: Scopula
- Species: S. argyroleuca

Binomial name
- Scopula argyroleuca (Hampson, 1910)

Synonyms
- Craspedia argyroleuca Hampson, 1910

= Scopula argyroleuca =

Species of geometer moth in subfamily Sterrhinae

Scopula argyroleuca is a moth of the family Geometridae. It was described by George Hampson in 1910. It is found in Kenya and Zambia.
