= Eupithecia licita =

Scientific classification
- Kingdom: Animalia
- Phylum: Arthropoda
- Clade: Pancrustacea
- Class: Insecta
- Order: Lepidoptera
- Family: Geometridae
- Genus: Eupithecia
- Species: E. licita

Binomial name
- Eupithecia licita Prout L.B., 1917

Synonyms
- Eupithecia vepallida Prout, 1925

Species of moth

Eupithecia licita is a moth in the family Geometridae. It is found in South Africa.
