= Eupithecia hypophasma =

Scientific classification
- Kingdom: Animalia
- Phylum: Arthropoda
- Clade: Pancrustacea
- Class: Insecta
- Order: Lepidoptera
- Family: Geometridae
- Genus: Eupithecia
- Species: E. hypophasma

Binomial name
- Eupithecia hypophasma L. B. Prout, 1913

Species of moth

Eupithecia hypophasma is a moth in the family Geometridae. It is found in South Africa and Lesotho, and possibly in Kenya.

The forewing length is 10–11 mm (0.39–0.43 in) for males and 11–12 mm (0.43–0.47 in) for females.
