= Eupithecia subscriptaria =

Scientific classification
- Kingdom: Animalia
- Phylum: Arthropoda
- Clade: Pancrustacea
- Class: Insecta
- Order: Lepidoptera
- Family: Geometridae
- Genus: Eupithecia
- Species: E. subscriptaria

Binomial name
- Eupithecia subscriptaria L. B. Prout, 1917

Species of moth

Eupithecia subscriptaria is a moth in the family Geometridae. It is found in South Africa.
