= Eupithecia monticola =

Scientific classification
- Kingdom: Animalia
- Phylum: Arthropoda
- Clade: Pancrustacea
- Class: Insecta
- Order: Lepidoptera
- Family: Geometridae
- Genus: Eupithecia
- Species: E. monticola

Binomial name
- Eupithecia monticola Krüger, 1999/2000

Species of moth

Eupithecia monticola is a moth in the family Geometridae. It is found in Lesotho (Maloti Mountains) and South Africa.

The forewing length is 11 mm (0.43 in) for males and 11–13 mm (0.43–0.51 in) for females.
