= Eupithecia rediviva =

Scientific classification
- Kingdom: Animalia
- Phylum: Arthropoda
- Clade: Pancrustacea
- Class: Insecta
- Order: Lepidoptera
- Family: Geometridae
- Genus: Eupithecia
- Species: E. rediviva

Binomial name
- Eupithecia rediviva L. B. Prout, 1917

Species of moth

Eupithecia rediviva is a moth in the family Geometridae. It is found in Kenya, South Africa and Uganda.
