= Scopula irrufata =

Scientific classification
- Domain: Eukaryota
- Kingdom: Animalia
- Phylum: Arthropoda
- Class: Insecta
- Order: Lepidoptera
- Family: Geometridae
- Genus: Scopula
- Species: S. irrufata

Binomial name
- Scopula irrufata (Warren, 1905)

Synonyms
- Sterrha irrufata Warren, 1905

Species of geometer moth in subfamily Sterrhinae

Scopula irrufata is a moth of the family Geometridae. It is found in South Africa.
