= Scopula concolor =

Scientific classification
- Domain: Eukaryota
- Kingdom: Animalia
- Phylum: Arthropoda
- Class: Insecta
- Order: Lepidoptera
- Family: Geometridae
- Genus: Scopula
- Species: S. concolor

Binomial name
- Scopula concolor (Warren, 1905)

Synonyms
- Cartaletis concolor Warren, 1905

Species of geometer moth in subfamily Sterrhinae

Scopula concolor is a moth of the family Geometridae. It was described by Warren in 1905. It is endemic to South Africa.
