= Scopula punctilineata =

Scientific classification
- Kingdom: Animalia
- Phylum: Arthropoda
- Clade: Pancrustacea
- Class: Insecta
- Order: Lepidoptera
- Family: Geometridae
- Genus: Scopula
- Species: S. punctilineata

Binomial name
- Scopula punctilineata (Warren, 1897)

Synonyms
- Sterrha punctilineata Warren, 1897

Species of geometer moth in subfamily Sterrhinae

Scopula punctilineata is a species of moth in the family Geometridae. It was first described in 1897 by William Warren. It is found in South Africa and Zimbabwe.
