= Scopula antiloparia =

Scientific classification
- Domain: Eukaryota
- Kingdom: Animalia
- Phylum: Arthropoda
- Class: Insecta
- Order: Lepidoptera
- Family: Geometridae
- Genus: Scopula
- Species: S. antiloparia

Binomial name
- Scopula antiloparia (Wallengren, 1863)

Synonyms
- Acidalia antiloparia Wallengren, 1863

Species of geometer moth in subfamily Sterrhinae

Scopula antiloparia is a moth of the family Geometridae. It was described by Wallengren in 1863. It is endemic to Namibia.
