= Scopula demissaria =

Scientific classification
- Domain: Eukaryota
- Kingdom: Animalia
- Phylum: Arthropoda
- Class: Insecta
- Order: Lepidoptera
- Family: Geometridae
- Genus: Scopula
- Species: S. demissaria

Binomial name
- Scopula demissaria (Walker, [1863])

Synonyms
- Acidalia demissaria Walker, 1863; Anisodes demissaria

Species of geometer moth in subfamily Sterrhinae

Scopula demissaria is a moth of the family Geometridae. It is endemic to South Africa.
