= Eupithecia laticallis =

Scientific classification
- Kingdom: Animalia
- Phylum: Arthropoda
- Clade: Pancrustacea
- Class: Insecta
- Order: Lepidoptera
- Family: Geometridae
- Genus: Eupithecia
- Species: E. laticallis

Binomial name
- Eupithecia laticallis L. B. Prout, 1922

Species of moth

Eupithecia laticallis is a moth in the family Geometridae. It is found in South Africa, Lesotho, and Namibia.

The forewing length is 11–12 mm (0.43–0.47 in) for both males and females.
