= Eupithecia altitudinis =

Scientific classification
- Kingdom: Animalia
- Phylum: Arthropoda
- Clade: Pancrustacea
- Class: Insecta
- Order: Lepidoptera
- Family: Geometridae
- Genus: Eupithecia
- Species: E. altitudinis

Binomial name
- Eupithecia altitudinis Krüger, 2000Krüger, 1999/2000

Species of moth

Eupithecia altitudinis is a moth in the family Geometridae. It is found in Lesotho. The specific name altitudinis refers to the high altitude from which the type series was obtained, 2,700–3,120 m (8,860–10,240 ft) above sea level.

The forewing length is 11–12 mm (0.43–0.47 in) for males.
