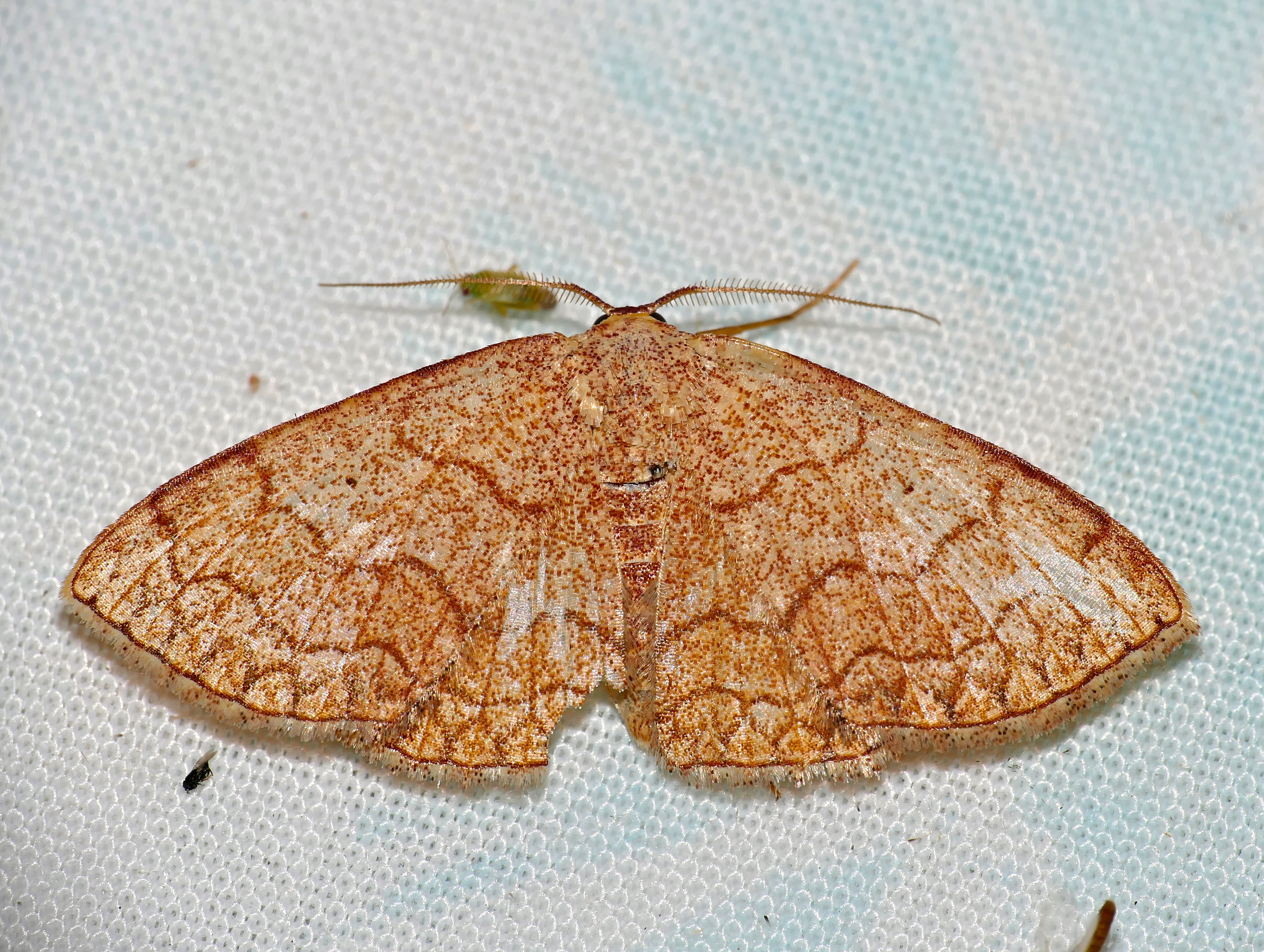

Scientific classification
- Domain: Eukaryota
- Kingdom: Animalia
- Phylum: Arthropoda
- Class: Insecta
- Order: Lepidoptera
- Family: Geometridae
- Genus: Scopula
- Species: S. trisinuata

Binomial name
- Scopula trisinuata (Warren, 1897)

Synonyms
- Isoplenia trisinuata Warren, 1897

= Scopula trisinuata =

Species of geometer moth in subfamily Sterrhinae

Scopula trisinuata, the sinuous wave, is a moth of the family Geometridae. It is found in Angola, Ghana, Kenya, Malawi, South Africa and Zambia.
