= Scopula carnosa =

Scientific classification
- Domain: Eukaryota
- Kingdom: Animalia
- Phylum: Arthropoda
- Class: Insecta
- Order: Lepidoptera
- Family: Geometridae
- Genus: Scopula
- Species: S. carnosa

Binomial name
- Scopula carnosa Prout, 1925

Species of geometer moth in subfamily Sterrhinae

Scopula carnosa is a moth of the family Geometridae. It was described by Prout in 1925. It is endemic to South Africa.
