= Eupithecia perigrapta =

Scientific classification
- Domain: Eukaryota
- Kingdom: Animalia
- Phylum: Arthropoda
- Class: Insecta
- Order: Lepidoptera
- Family: Geometridae
- Genus: Eupithecia
- Species: E. perigrapta

Binomial name
- Eupithecia perigrapta Janse, 1933

Species of moth

Eupithecia perigrapta is a moth in the family Geometridae. It is found in South Africa.
