= Scopula rossi =

Scientific classification
- Kingdom: Animalia
- Phylum: Arthropoda
- Clade: Pancrustacea
- Class: Insecta
- Order: Lepidoptera
- Family: Geometridae
- Genus: Scopula
- Species: S. rossi

Binomial name
- Scopula rossi (Prout, 1913)

Synonyms
- Acidalia rossi Prout, 1913

Species of geometer moth in subfamily Sterrhinae

Scopula rossi is a moth of the family Geometridae. It is found in South Africa.
