= Scopula astrabes =

Scientific classification
- Domain: Eukaryota
- Kingdom: Animalia
- Phylum: Arthropoda
- Class: Insecta
- Order: Lepidoptera
- Family: Geometridae
- Genus: Scopula
- Species: S. astrabes

Binomial name
- Scopula astrabes Prout, 1932

Species of geometer moth in subfamily Sterrhinae

Scopula astrabes is a moth of the family Geometridae. It was described by Prout in 1932. It is endemic to South Africa.
