= Scopula ludibunda =

Scientific classification
- Kingdom: Animalia
- Phylum: Arthropoda
- Clade: Pancrustacea
- Class: Insecta
- Order: Lepidoptera
- Family: Geometridae
- Genus: Scopula
- Species: S. ludibunda

Binomial name
- Scopula ludibunda (Prout, 1915)

Synonyms
- Acidalia ludibunda Prout, 1915

Species of geometer moth in subfamily Sterrhinae

Scopula ludibunda is a moth of the family Geometridae. It is found in Zimbabwe and South Africa.
