= Scopula dentisignata =

Scientific classification
- Kingdom: Animalia
- Phylum: Arthropoda
- Class: Insecta
- Order: Lepidoptera
- Family: Geometridae
- Genus: Scopula
- Species: S. dentisignata

Binomial name
- Scopula dentisignata (Walker, [1863])

Synonyms
- Acidalia dentisignata Walker, [1863]; Epicosymbia dentisignata; Epicosymbia denticulata Prout, 1933; Epicosymbia perrufa Warren, 1897

Species of geometer moth in subfamily Sterrhinae

Scopula dentisignata is a moth of the family Geometridae. It is found in Tanzania, Zimbabwe, South Africa and Zambia.
