= Scopula nitidata =

Scientific classification
- Domain: Eukaryota
- Kingdom: Animalia
- Phylum: Arthropoda
- Class: Insecta
- Order: Lepidoptera
- Family: Geometridae
- Genus: Scopula
- Species: S. nitidata

Binomial name
- Scopula nitidata (Warren, 1905)

Synonyms
- Cosymbia nitidata Warren, 1905; Epicosymbia nitidata Warren, 1905; Isoplenia albivertex Warren, 1900

Species of geometer moth in subfamily Sterrhinae

Scopula nitidata is a moth of the family Geometridae. It was first described by William Warren in 1905 and is found in South Africa.
