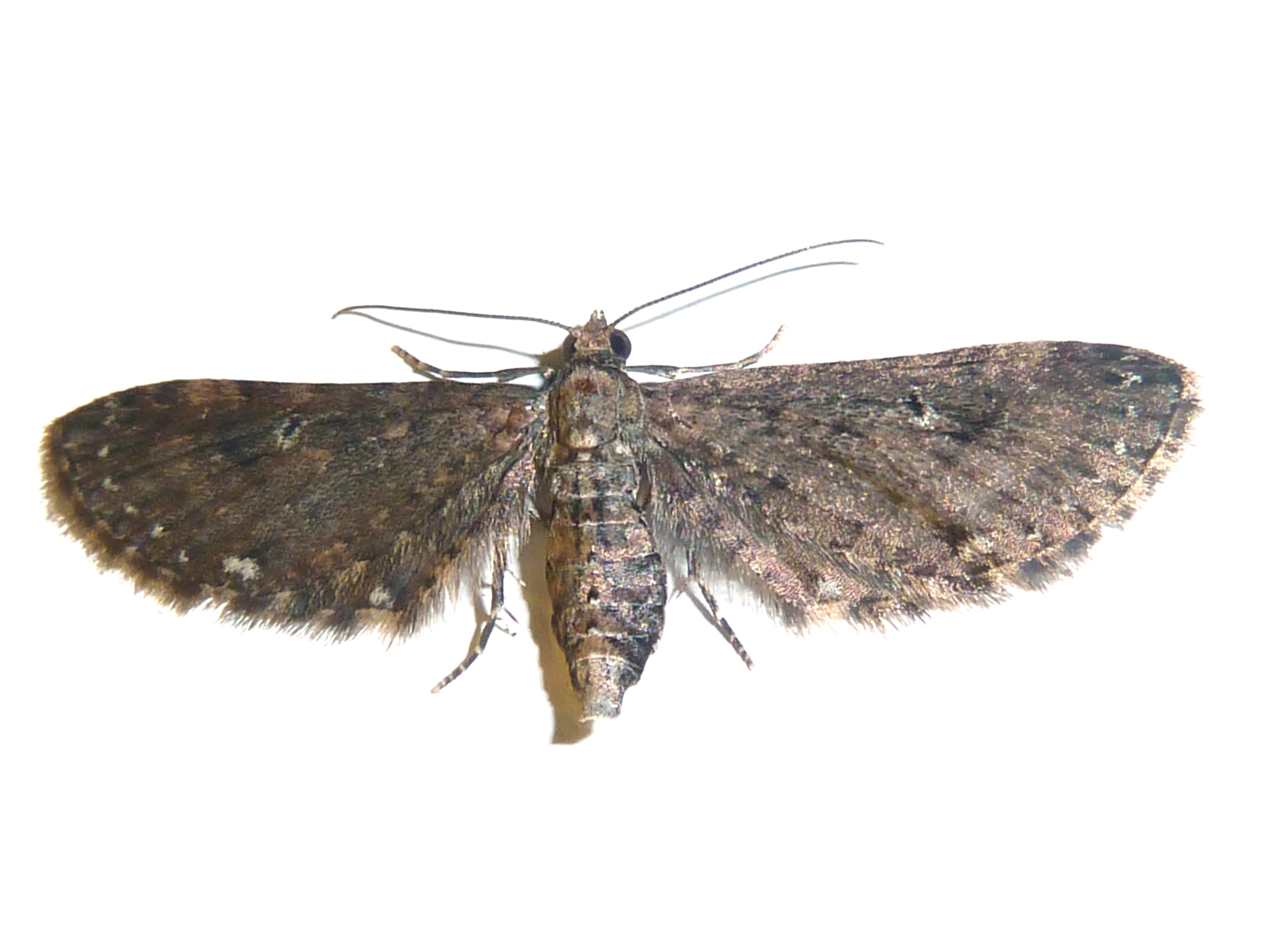

Scientific classification
- Kingdom: Animalia
- Phylum: Arthropoda
- Clade: Pancrustacea
- Class: Insecta
- Order: Lepidoptera
- Family: Geometridae
- Genus: Eupithecia
- Species: E. infelix

Binomial name
- Eupithecia infelix Prout, 1917

= Eupithecia infelix =

Species of moth

Eupithecia infelix is a moth found in the family of Geometridae. It is found in South Africa.
