= Eupithecia inscitata =

Scientific classification
- Domain: Eukaryota
- Kingdom: Animalia
- Phylum: Arthropoda
- Class: Insecta
- Order: Lepidoptera
- Family: Geometridae
- Genus: Eupithecia
- Species: E. inscitata

Binomial name
- Eupithecia inscitata Walker, 1863

Species of moth

Eupithecia inscitata is a moth in the family Geometridae. It is found in South Africa.
