= Scopula instructata =

Scientific classification
- Kingdom: Animalia
- Phylum: Arthropoda
- Class: Insecta
- Order: Lepidoptera
- Family: Geometridae
- Genus: Scopula
- Species: S. instructata

Binomial name
- Scopula instructata (Walker, 1863)

Synonyms
- Acidalia instructata Walker, 1863

Species of geometer moth in subfamily Sterrhinae

Scopula instructata is a moth of the family Geometridae. It is found in South Africa.
