= Scopula flexio =

Scientific classification
- Domain: Eukaryota
- Kingdom: Animalia
- Phylum: Arthropoda
- Class: Insecta
- Order: Lepidoptera
- Family: Geometridae
- Genus: Scopula
- Species: S. flexio

Binomial name
- Scopula flexio Prout, 1917

Species of geometer moth in subfamily Sterrhinae

Scopula flexio is a moth of the family Geometridae. It is endemic to South Africa.
