= Scopula deserta =

Scientific classification
- Kingdom: Animalia
- Phylum: Arthropoda
- Clade: Pancrustacea
- Class: Insecta
- Order: Lepidoptera
- Family: Geometridae
- Genus: Scopula
- Species: S. deserta

Binomial name
- Scopula deserta (Warren, 1897)

Synonyms
- Craspedia deserta Warren, 1897

Species of geometer moth in subfamily Sterrhinae

Scopula deserta is a moth of the family Geometridae. It was described by Warren in 1897. It is found in South Africa and Zambia.
