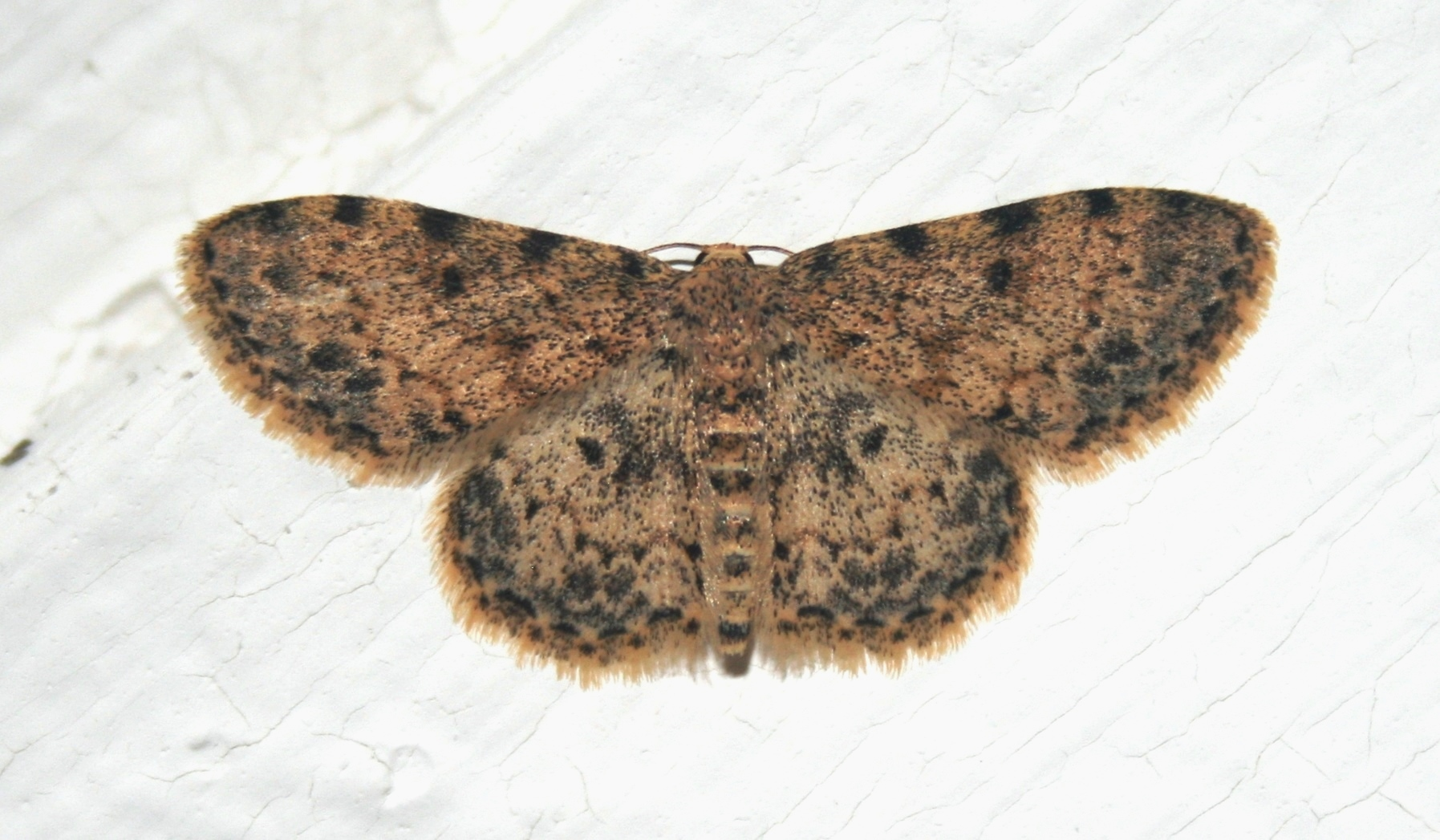

Scientific classification
- Kingdom: Animalia
- Phylum: Arthropoda
- Class: Insecta
- Order: Lepidoptera
- Family: Geometridae
- Genus: Scopula
- Species: S. nigrinotata

Binomial name
- Scopula nigrinotata (Warren, 1897)

Synonyms
- Craspedia nigrinotata Warren, 1897; Scopula nachtigali Herbulot, 1965

= Scopula nigrinotata =

Species of geometer moth in subfamily Sterrhinae

Scopula nigrinotata is a species of moth in the family Geometridae. It is found in Ethiopia, Ghana, Malawi, Nigeria, Sierra Leone, South Africa, Sudan, Uganda and Zimbabwe.
