= Eupithecia coaequalis =

Scientific classification
- Domain: Eukaryota
- Kingdom: Animalia
- Phylum: Arthropoda
- Class: Insecta
- Order: Lepidoptera
- Family: Geometridae
- Genus: Eupithecia
- Species: E. coaequalis

Binomial name
- Eupithecia coaequalis Janse, 1933

Species of moth

Eupithecia coaequalis is a moth in the family Geometridae. It is found in Zimbabwe.
