= Eupithecia inconclusaria =

Scientific classification
- Kingdom: Animalia
- Phylum: Arthropoda
- Class: Insecta
- Order: Lepidoptera
- Family: Geometridae
- Genus: Eupithecia
- Species: E. inconclusaria

Binomial name
- Eupithecia inconclusaria Walker, 1862

Synonyms
- Eupithecia macropterata Walker, 1866

Species of moth

Eupithecia inconclusaria is a moth in the family Geometridae. It is found in South Africa.
