= Eupithecia subcanipars =

Scientific classification
- Kingdom: Animalia
- Phylum: Arthropoda
- Clade: Pancrustacea
- Class: Insecta
- Order: Lepidoptera
- Family: Geometridae
- Genus: Eupithecia
- Species: E. subcanipars

Binomial name
- Eupithecia subcanipars L. B. Prout, 1917

Species of moth

Eupithecia subcanipars is a moth in the family Geometridae. It is found in South Africa.
