= Eupithecia reginamontium =

Scientific classification
- Kingdom: Animalia
- Phylum: Arthropoda
- Clade: Pancrustacea
- Class: Insecta
- Order: Lepidoptera
- Family: Geometridae
- Genus: Eupithecia
- Species: E. reginamontium

Binomial name
- Eupithecia reginamontium Krüger, 2000

Synonyms
- Eupithecia reginamontanum Krüger, 1999 – missapplied

Species of moth

Eupithecia reginamontium is a moth in the family Geometridae. It is found in the Maloti Mountains, Lesotho.

The forewing length is 12–13 mm (0.47–0.51 in) for males and 12–14 mm (0.47–0.55 in) for females.
