= Scopula picta =

Scientific classification
- Domain: Eukaryota
- Kingdom: Animalia
- Phylum: Arthropoda
- Class: Insecta
- Order: Lepidoptera
- Family: Geometridae
- Genus: Scopula
- Species: S. picta

Binomial name
- Scopula picta (Warren, 1897)

Synonyms
- Sterrha picta Warren, 1897; Sterrha fulvilinea Warren, 1914

Species of geometer moth in subfamily Sterrhinae

Scopula picta is a moth of the family Geometridae. It is found in South Africa.
