= Eupithecia pettyi =

Scientific classification
- Kingdom: Animalia
- Phylum: Arthropoda
- Clade: Pancrustacea
- Class: Insecta
- Order: Lepidoptera
- Family: Geometridae
- Genus: Eupithecia
- Species: E. pettyi

Binomial name
- Eupithecia pettyi Prout L.B., 1935

Synonyms
- Eupithecia parallelaria Janse, 1933 (preocc. Bohatsch, 1893)

Species of moth

Eupithecia pettyi is a moth in the family Geometridae. It is found in South Africa.
