= Scopula drenowskii =

Scientific classification
- Domain: Eukaryota
- Kingdom: Animalia
- Phylum: Arthropoda
- Class: Insecta
- Order: Lepidoptera
- Family: Geometridae
- Genus: Scopula
- Species: S. drenowskii

Binomial name
- Scopula drenowskii Sterneck, 1941

Species of geometer moth in subfamily Sterrhinae

Scopula drenowskii is a moth of the family Geometridae. It is found in Bulgaria and Turkey.

== Taxonomy ==
The species was previously listed as a synonym of Scopula decorata, but was reinstated as a valid species by Can in 2009.
