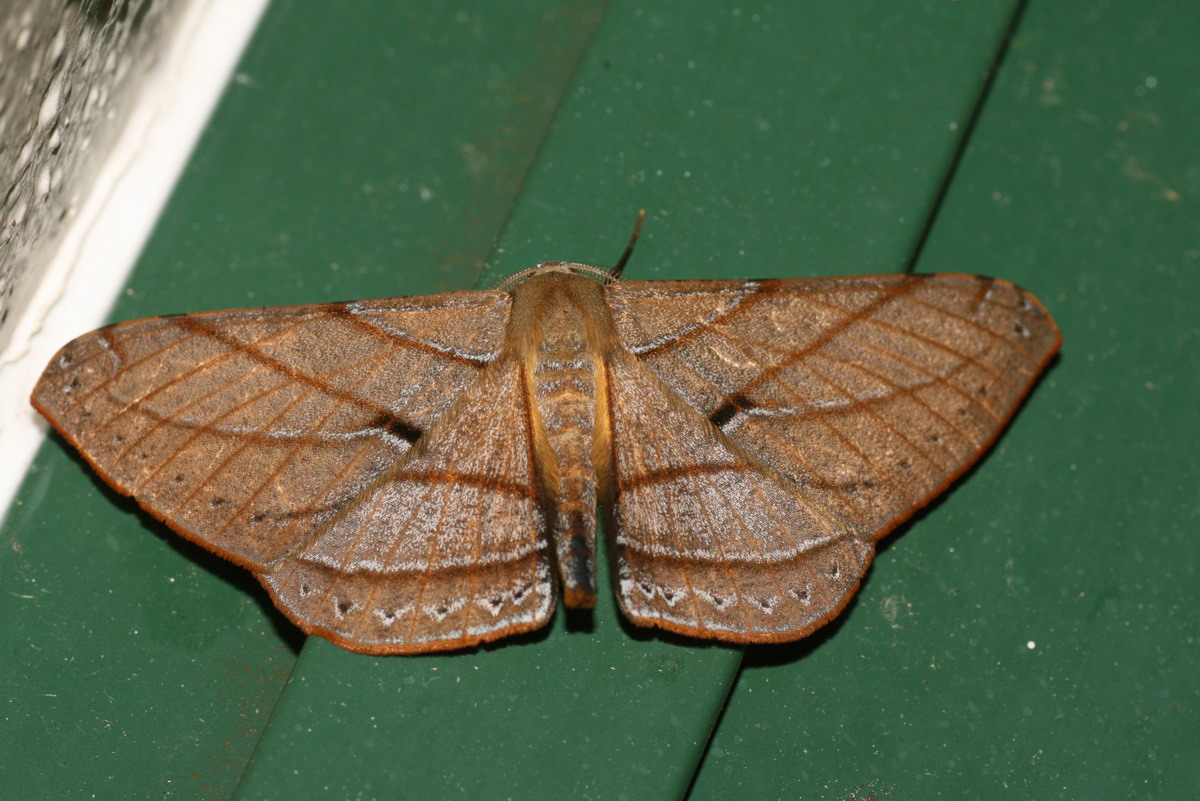

Scientific classification
- Kingdom: Animalia
- Phylum: Arthropoda
- Class: Insecta
- Order: Lepidoptera
- Family: Geometridae
- Genus: Dalima
- Species: D. patularia

Binomial name
- Dalima patularia (Walker, 1860)

Synonyms
- Omiza patularia Walker, 1860

= Dalima patularia =

Species of moth

Dalima patularia is a moth of the family Geometridae. It is found in the Himalaya, northern Thailand, western China, Borneo, Sumatra and Sulawesi.

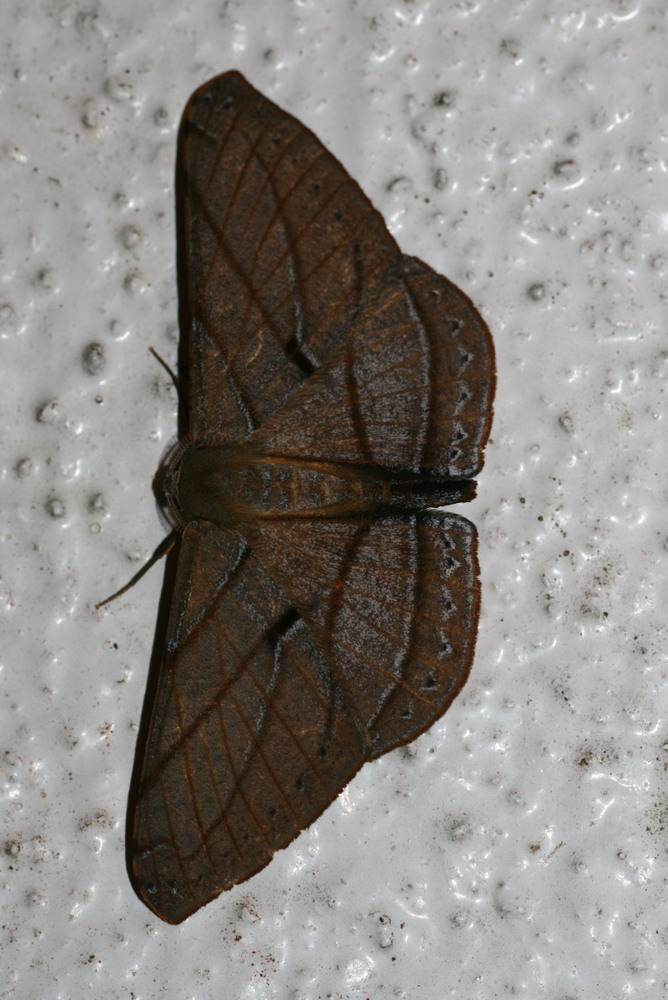
