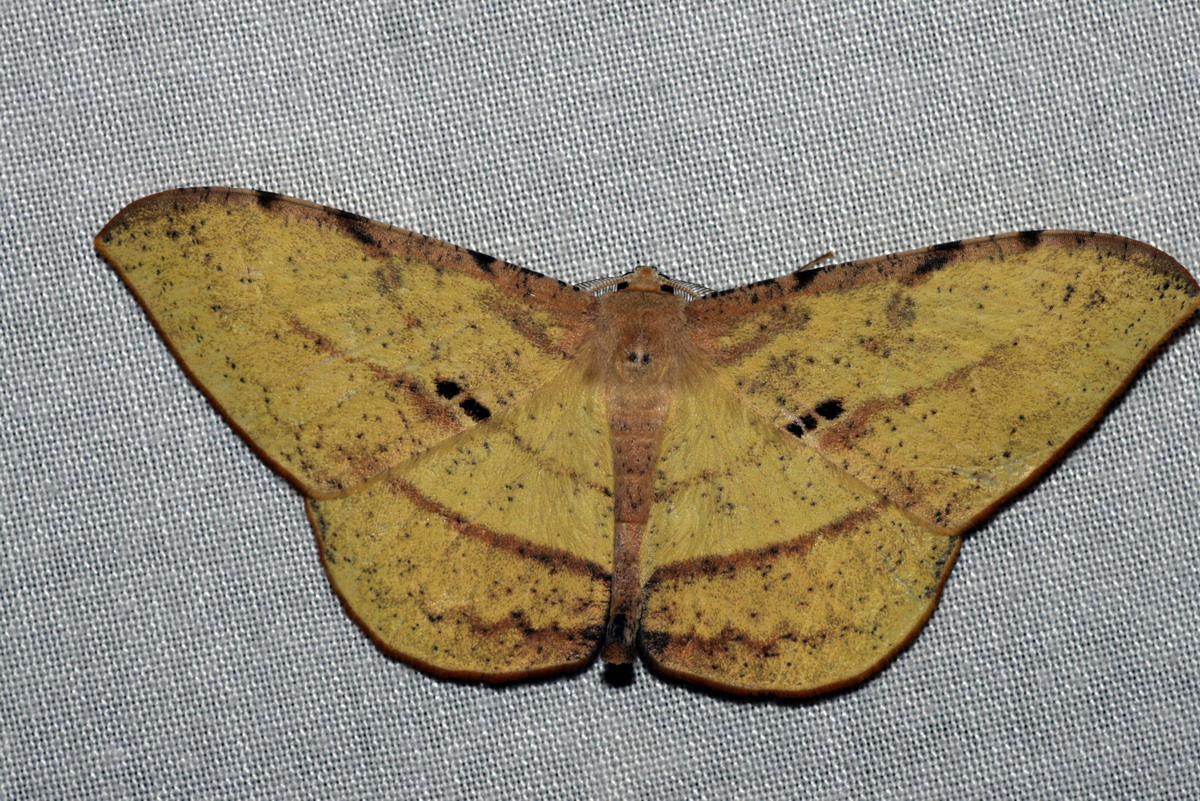

Scientific classification
- Domain: Eukaryota
- Kingdom: Animalia
- Phylum: Arthropoda
- Class: Insecta
- Order: Lepidoptera
- Family: Geometridae
- Genus: Dalima
- Species: D. subflavata

Binomial name
- Dalima subflavata (Felder & Rogenhofer, 1875)

Synonyms
- Xandrames subflavata Felder & Rogenhofer, 1875

= Dalima subflavata =

Species of moth

Dalima subflavata is a moth of the family Geometridae. It is found in Sumatra, Java and Borneo.
