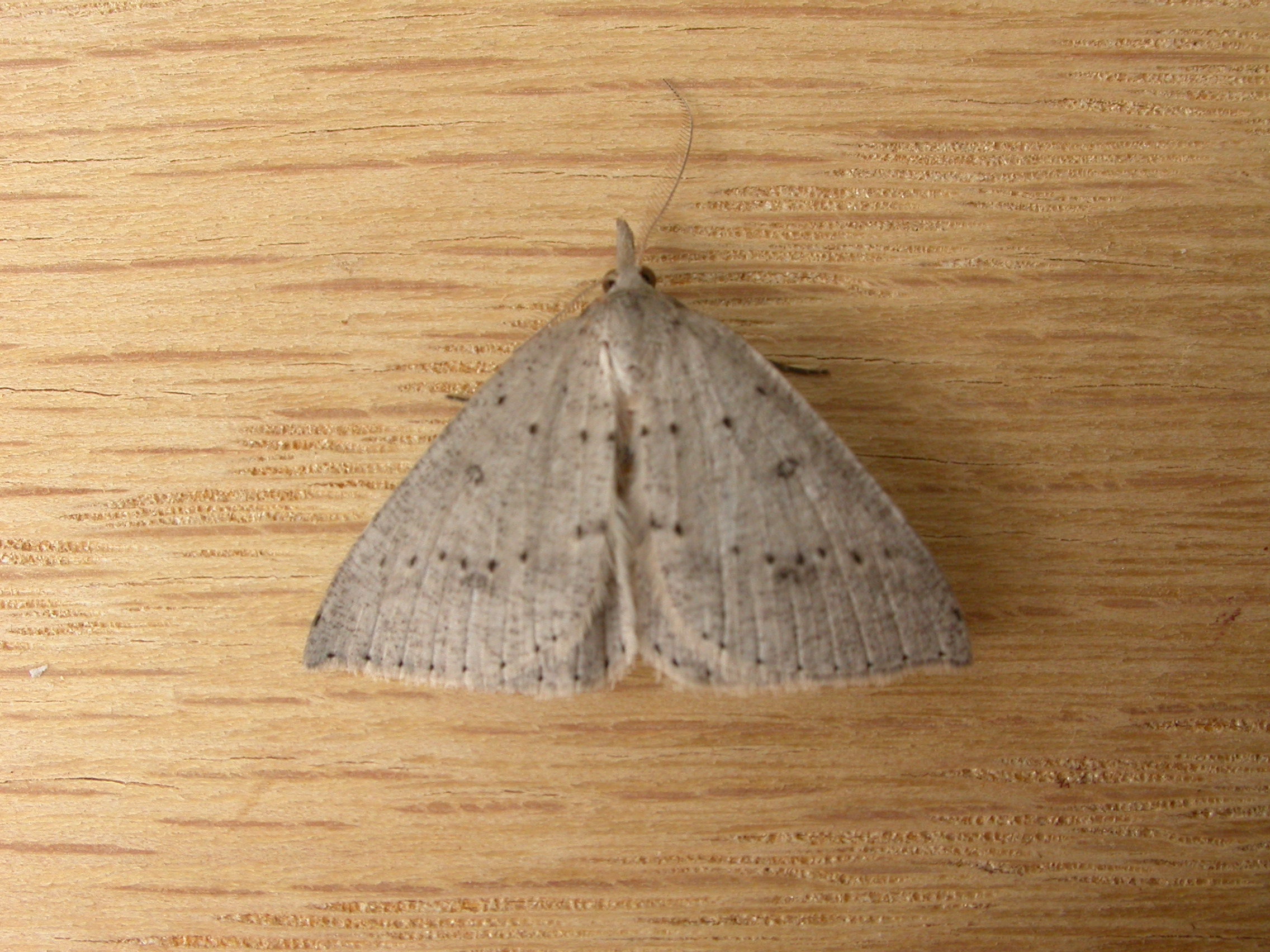

Scientific classification
- Kingdom: Animalia
- Phylum: Arthropoda
- Class: Insecta
- Order: Lepidoptera
- Family: Geometridae
- Genus: Nearcha
- Species: N. nullata

Binomial name
- Nearcha nullata Guenée, 1857

= Nearcha nullata =

Species of moth

Nearcha nullata is a moth of the family Geometridae. It is mainly found in Australia, more specifically in the South-Eastern quarter, including Tasmania. As hatching approaches, the initially white eggs gradually darken and develop into oval shapes marked by tiny serrated ridges.

The wingspan is about 30 mm.

The larvae feed on Dillwynia parvifolia.
