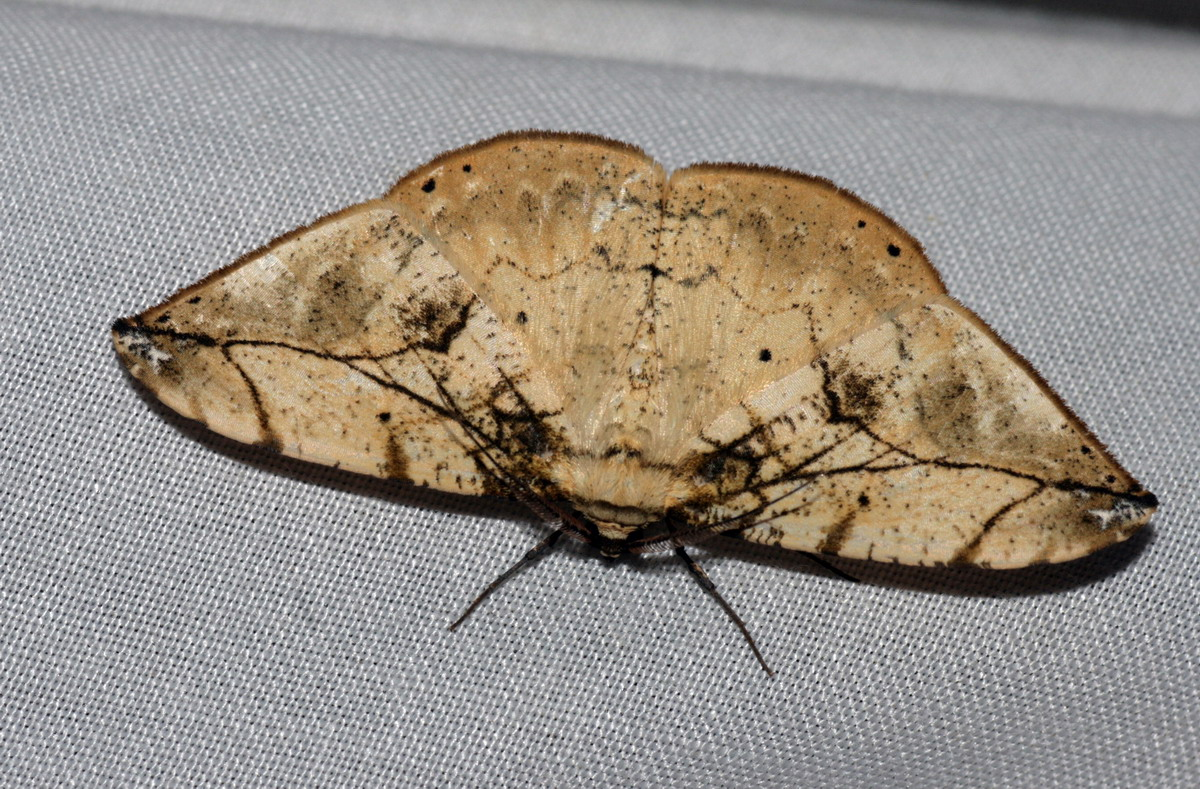

Scientific classification
- Domain: Eukaryota
- Kingdom: Animalia
- Phylum: Arthropoda
- Class: Insecta
- Order: Lepidoptera
- Family: Geometridae
- Genus: Dalima
- Species: D. delineata

Binomial name
- Dalima delineata (Warren, 1894)

Synonyms
- Metoxydia delineata Warren, 1894

= Dalima delineata =

Species of moth

Dalima delineata is a moth of the family Geometridae. It is found in Peninsular Malaysia, Sumatra and Borneo.
