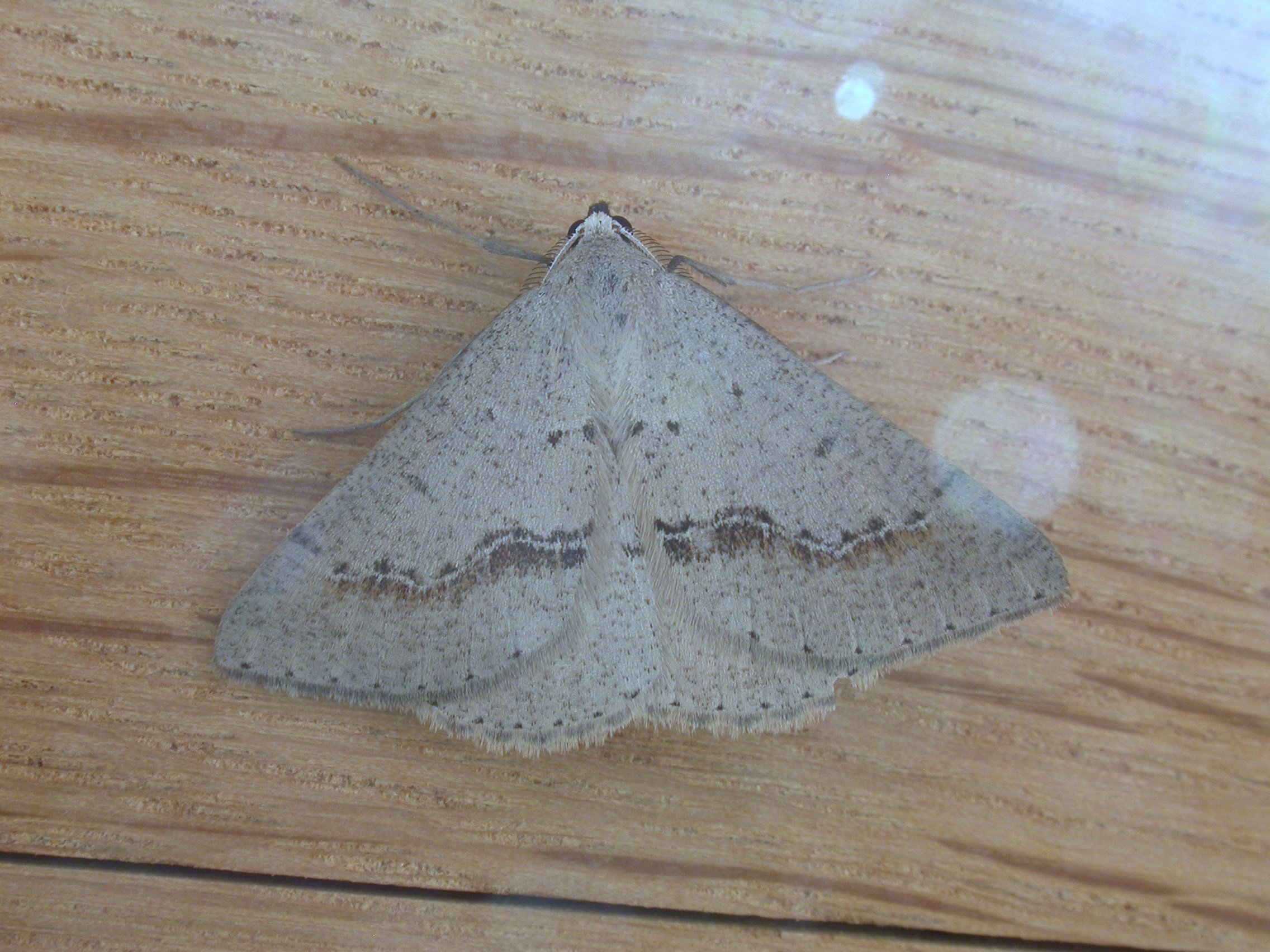

Scientific classification
- Domain: Eukaryota
- Kingdom: Animalia
- Phylum: Arthropoda
- Class: Insecta
- Order: Lepidoptera
- Family: Geometridae
- Genus: Nearcha
- Species: N. dasyzona

Binomial name
- Nearcha dasyzona Lower, 1903

= Nearcha dasyzona =

Species of moth

Nearcha dasyzona is a moth of the family Geometridae first described by Oswald Bertram Lower in 1903. It is found in Australia.
