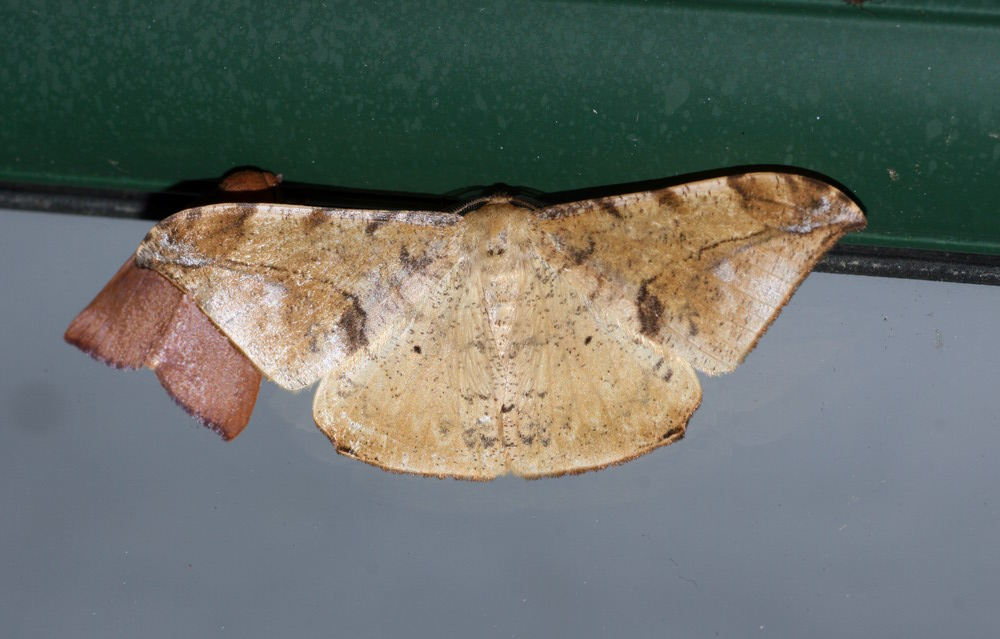

Scientific classification
- Kingdom: Animalia
- Phylum: Arthropoda
- Clade: Pancrustacea
- Class: Insecta
- Order: Lepidoptera
- Family: Geometridae
- Genus: Dalima
- Species: D. mjoebergi

Binomial name
- Dalima mjoebergi Prout, 1926

Synonyms
- Dalima mjobergi

= Dalima mjoebergi =

Species of moth

Dalima mjoebergi is a moth of the family Geometridae. It is endemic to Borneo.
