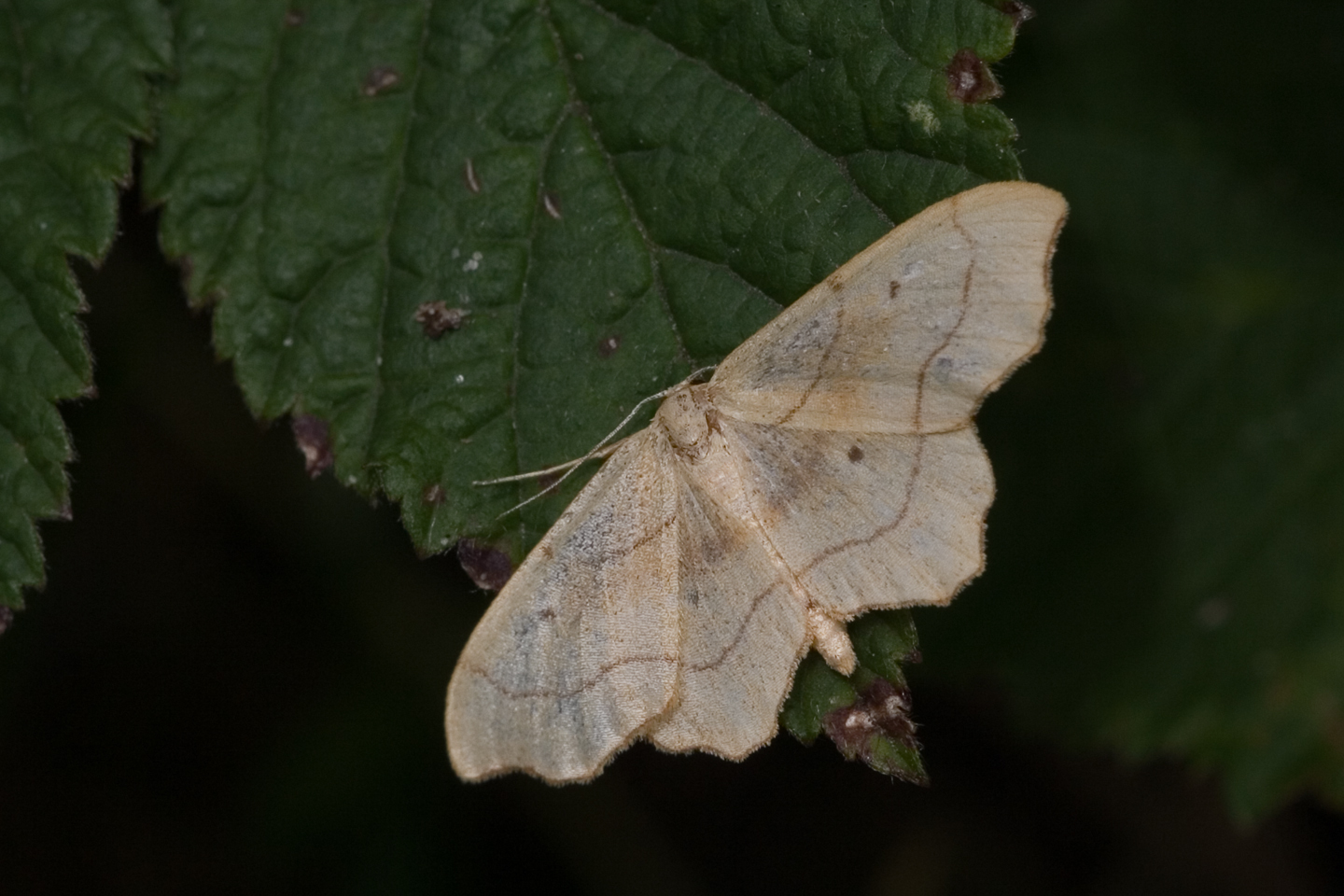

Scientific classification
- Kingdom: Animalia
- Phylum: Arthropoda
- Clade: Pancrustacea
- Class: Insecta
- Order: Lepidoptera
- Family: Geometridae
- Genus: Idaea
- Species: I. emarginata

Binomial name
- Idaea emarginata (Linnaeus, 1758)

= Idaea emarginata =

Small scallop

Species of moth

Idaea emarginata, the small scallop, is a moth of the family Geometridae. It was first described by Carl Linnaeus in his 1758 10th edition of Systema Naturae and it is found in Europe.

The species has a wingspan of 22–25 mm. The length of the forewings is 11–13 mm. The adults fly at night from June to August, and can be attracted to light.

The species prefers damp locations such as marshy woodland, meadows and marshes.

1. The flight season refers to the British Isles. This may vary in other parts of the range.
