= Geometridites =

Scientific classification
- Kingdom: Animalia
- Phylum: Arthropoda
- Class: Insecta
- Order: Lepidoptera
- Family: Geometridae
- Genus: Geometridites; Clark et al., 1971

Extinct genus of moths

Geometridites is an extinct genus of moths in the family Geometridae. The genus was erected by Clark et al. in 1971.

== Species ==
- †Geometridites jordani Kernbach, 1967 (Willershausen, Pliocene)
- †Geometridites larentiiformis Jarzembowski, 1980
- †Geometridites repens Kernbach, 1967
