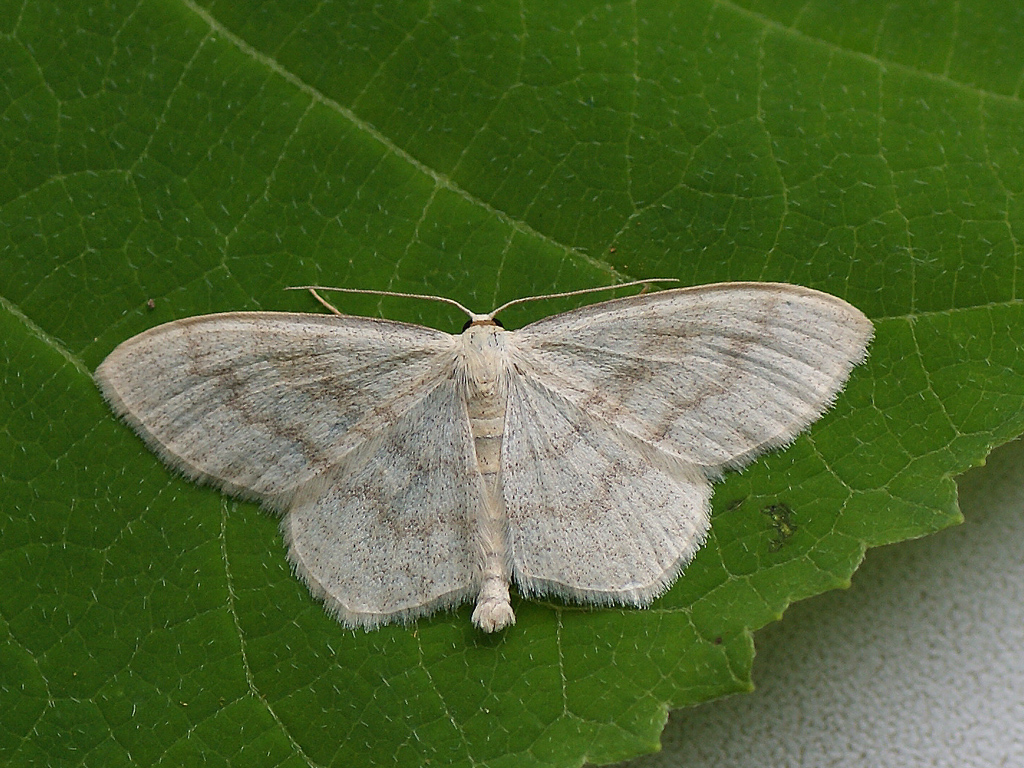

Scientific classification
- Domain: Eukaryota
- Kingdom: Animalia
- Phylum: Arthropoda
- Class: Insecta
- Order: Lepidoptera
- Family: Geometridae
- Genus: Scopula
- Species: S. floslactata

Binomial name
- Scopula floslactata (Haworth, 1809)

Synonyms
- Phalaena brunneata Goeze, 1781; Phalaena cariata Schrank, 1802; Phalaena concatenata Hufnagel, 1767; Phalaena dentilinearia Borkhausen, 1794; Phalaena fulvicans Fourcroy, 1785; Phalaena fulvostriata Goeze, 1781; Phalaena lactata Haworth, 1809; Scopula scotica Cockayne, 1951; Geometra remutaria Hubner 1799; Scopula spataceata (Scopoli, 1763); Phalaena strigata Fourcroy, 1785; Phalaena sublactata Haworth, 1809

= Cream wave =

Species of geometer moth in subfamily Sterrhinae

The cream wave (Scopula floslactata) is a moth of the family Geometridae. The species was first described by Adrian Hardy Haworth in 1809. It is found in forest and woodland regions, feeding on grasses and small plants such as dandelion.

== Distribution ==
It is a very common species in parts of France and central Europe. The range in the north extends to Scandinavia and Finland. The species is largely missing in southern Europe. There are isolated occurrences in southern Bulgaria and the Pyrenees). It extends east across the Palearctic from the Urals to the Russian Far East (Sakhalin) to Korea, north-eastern China and Japan.

== Description ==
Scopula floslactata has a wingspan of about three centimetres. Colour and pattern are variable. The wings are creamy white to yellowish white. Across the forewings and hindwings, there are usually three jagged crosslines. Occasionally, there is a wavy line in the marginal field. The discal flecks are small and are often missing on the forewings, or very much blurred. In contrast, the discal flecks on the hindwings are almost always present. The fringes are sometimes also slightly darker than the ground colour. The males have small, feathered antennae.

It is similar to Scopula immutata, but distinguished by its less rounded forewings and less developed or absent black discal spot.

== Biology ==
It has one generation per year, with adults taking flight from late May through early July.

The larvae feed on woodruff (Galium odoratum), dandelion (Taraxacum officinale), bilberry (Vaccinium myrtillus), Lonicera xylosteum, Alnus glutinosa, Galium verum, Rumex acetosa, and Vicia sepium. They also eat dry leaves of poplars (Populus) and willow (Salix).

== Subspecies ==
- Scopula floslactata floslactata (Europe to China)
- Scopula floslactata claudata Prout, 1913 (Japan, Korea, Russia: Primorye and South Kuriles)
