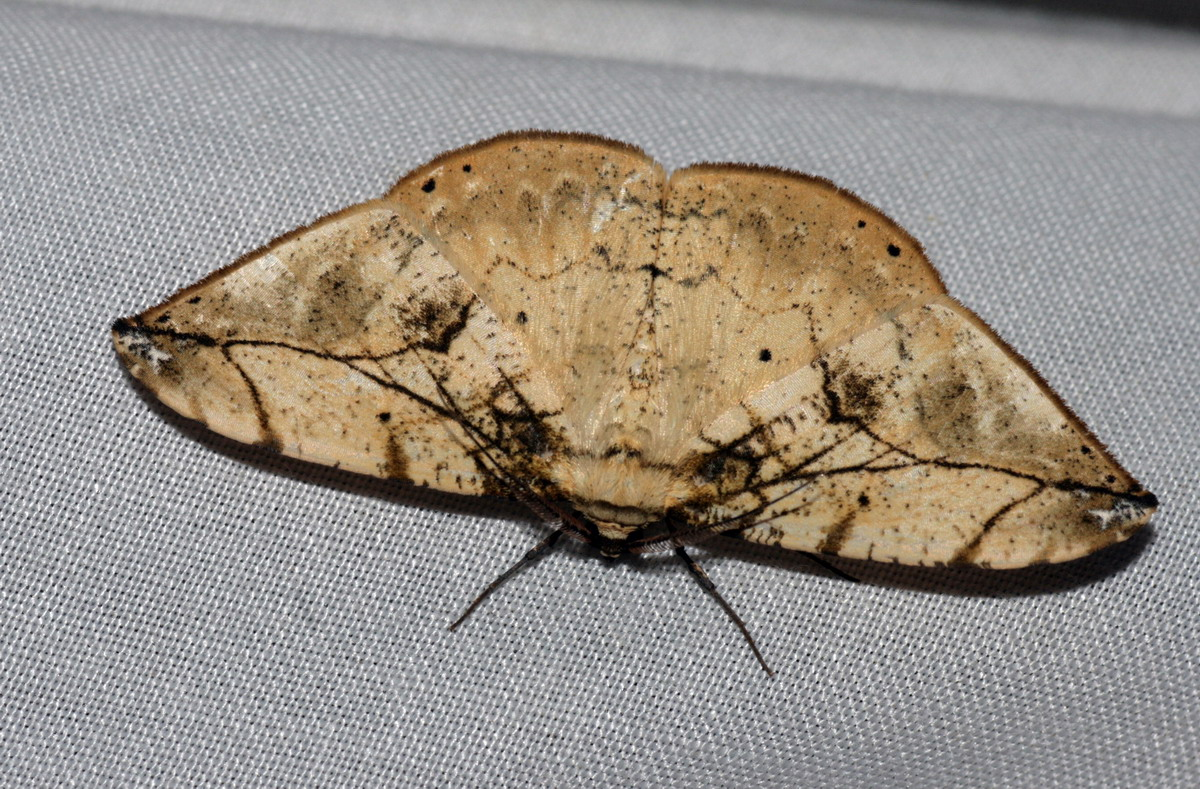
- Dalima delineata

Scientific classification
- Domain: Eukaryota
- Kingdom: Animalia
- Phylum: Arthropoda
- Class: Insecta
- Order: Lepidoptera
- Family: Geometridae
- Tribe: Boarmiini
- Genus: Dalima; Moore, [1868]

Synonyms
- Panisala Moore, [1868]; Metoxydia Butler, 1886; Hololoma Warren, 1893; Leptostichia Warren, 1893; Calladelphia Warren, 1894; Homoeoctenia Warren, 1894

= Dalima =

Genus of moths

Dalima is a genus of moths in the family Geometridae erected by Frederic Moore in 1868.

== Species ==
- Dalima apicata Moore, [1868]
- Dalima calamina (Butler, 1880)
- Dalima delineata (Warren, 1894)
- Dalima latitans (Warren, 1893)
- Dalima lucens (Warren, 1893)
- Dalima mjoebergi Prout, 1926
- Dalima patularia (Walker, 1860)
- Dalima schistacearia Moore
- Dalima subflavata (Felder & Rogenhofer, 1875)
- Dalima truncataria (Moore, [1868])
- Dalima metachromata (Walker, [1862])
- Dalima rana ([1993])
