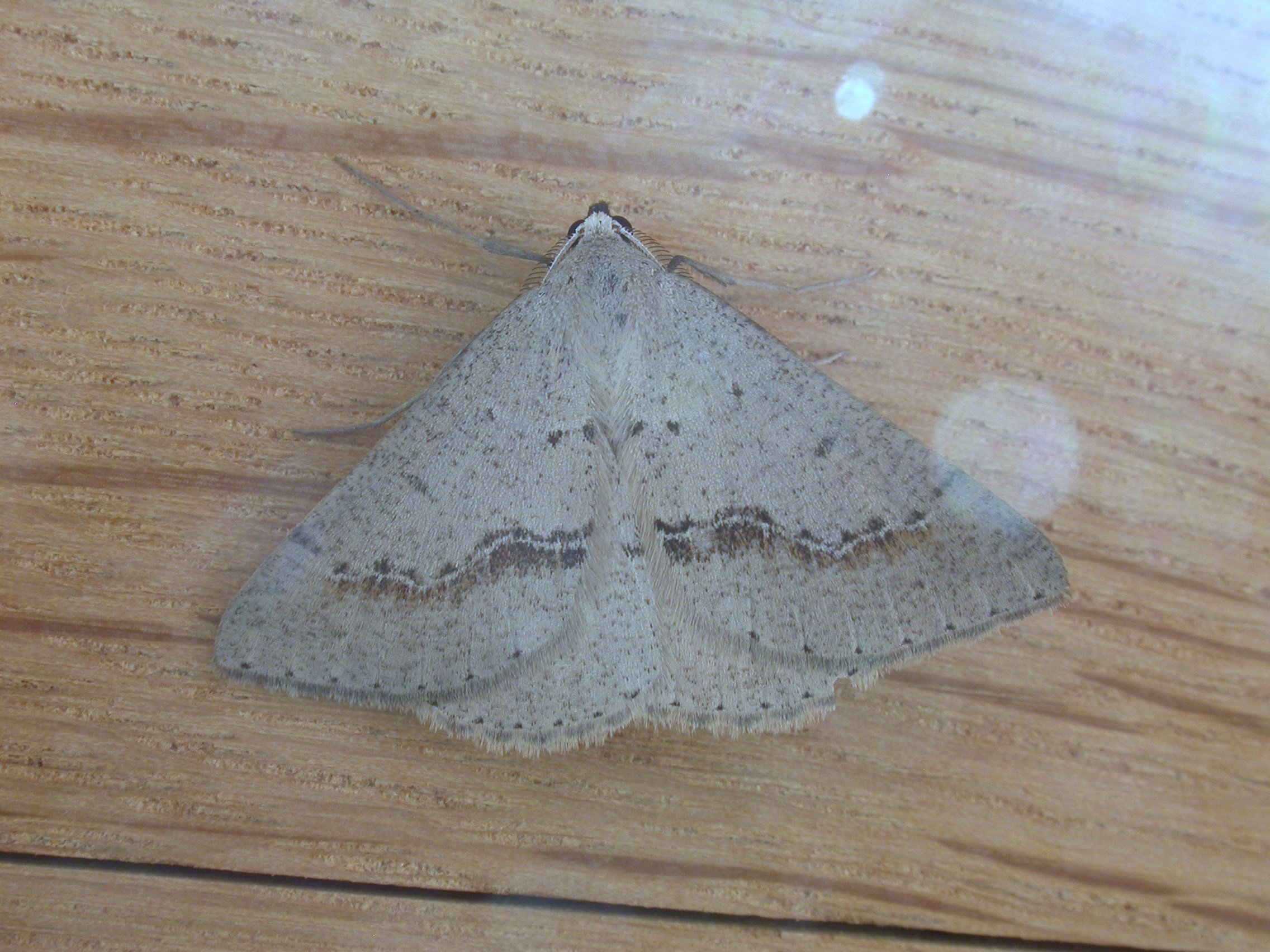
- Nearcha dasyzona

Scientific classification
- Kingdom: Animalia
- Phylum: Arthropoda
- Clade: Pancrustacea
- Class: Insecta
- Order: Lepidoptera
- Family: Geometridae
- Subfamily: Oenochrominae
- Genus: Nearcha; Guest, 1887

= Nearcha =

Genus of moths

Nearcha is a genus of moths in the family Geometridae described by Edward Guest in 1887. All species in the genus are known from Australia.

== Species ==
- Nearcha ursaria (Guenée, 1857)
- Nearcha benecristata Warren, 1895
- Nearcha dasyzona (Lower, 1903)
- Nearcha tristificata (Walker, 1861)
- Nearcha buffalaria (Guenée, 1857)
- Nearcha aridaria (Walker, 1866)
- Nearcha staurotis Meyrick, 1890
- Nearcha pseudophaes Lower, 1893
- Nearcha caronia Swinhoe, 1902
- Nearcha ophla Swinhoe, 1902
- Nearcha nullata (Guenée, 1857)
- Nearcha atyla Meyrick, 1890
- Nearcha curtaria (Guenée, 1857)
