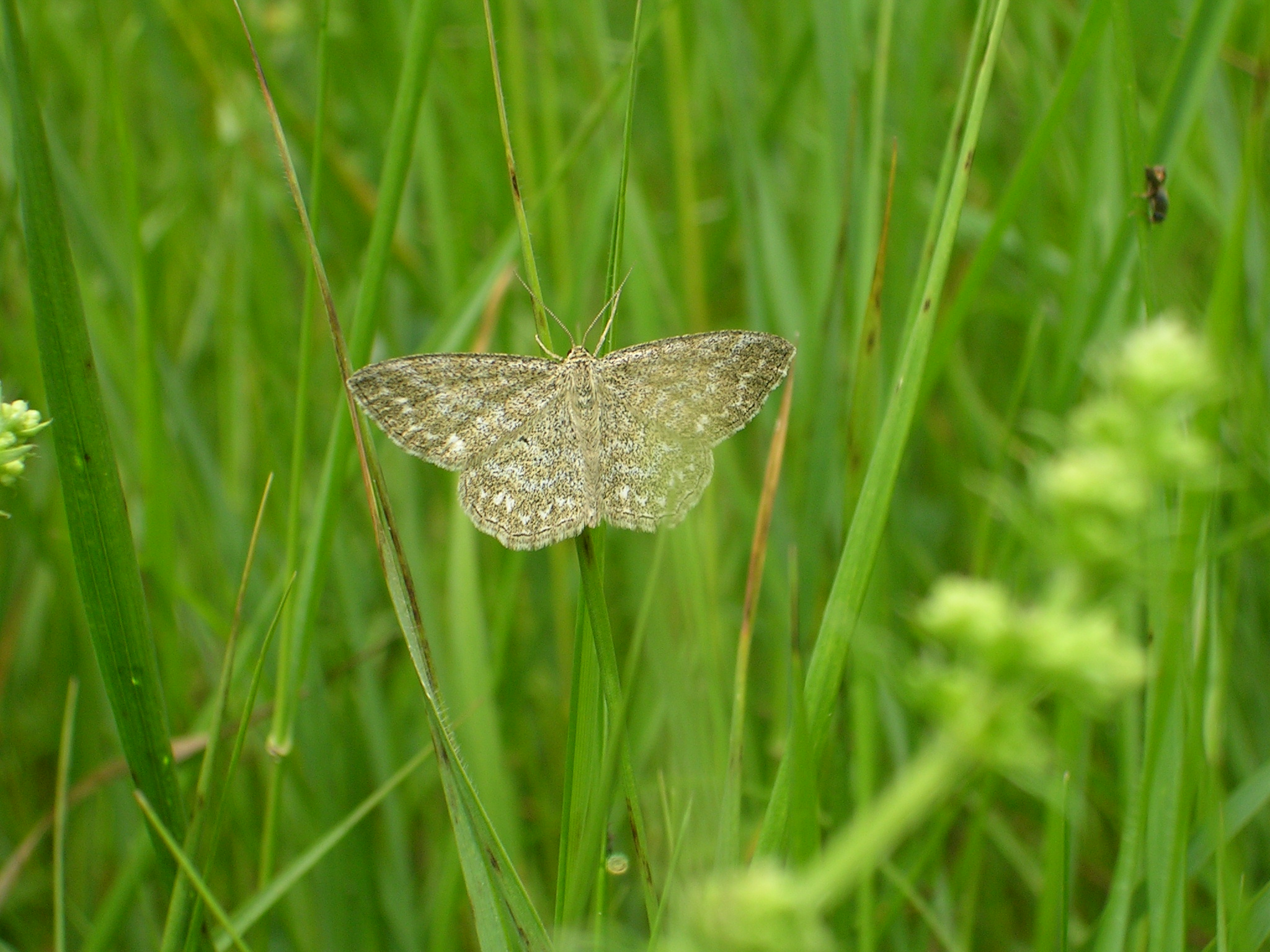

Scientific classification
- Kingdom: Animalia
- Phylum: Arthropoda
- Clade: Pancrustacea
- Class: Insecta
- Order: Lepidoptera
- Family: Geometridae
- Genus: Scopula
- Species: S. immorata

Binomial name
- Scopula immorata (Linnaeus, 1758)

Synonyms
- Phalaena immorata Linnaeus, 1758; Phalaena contaminata Scopoli, 1763; Phalaena festucaria Brahm, 1791; Phalaena fuscata Fabricius, 1794; Phalaena graminata Hufnagel, 1767; Geometra immoraria Hubner, 1799; Acidalia myrtillata Dadd, 1911

= Scopula immorata =

Lewes wave

Species of geometer moth in subfamily Sterrhinae

Scopula immorata, the Lewes wave, is a moth of the family Geometridae. It is found throughout Europe and the Near East.

The wingspan is 20–27 millimetres (0.79–1.06 in). The moth flies in two generations from the end of June to mid August in western Europe.

The larva feeds on various low-growing plants like thyme and oregano. Mating occurs from the males seeking out females in simple courtship behavior, taking place at ~6-10am for an hour to an hour and a half.

== Subspecies ==
- Scopula immorata immorata
- Scopula immorata duercki Sheljuzhko, 1955
