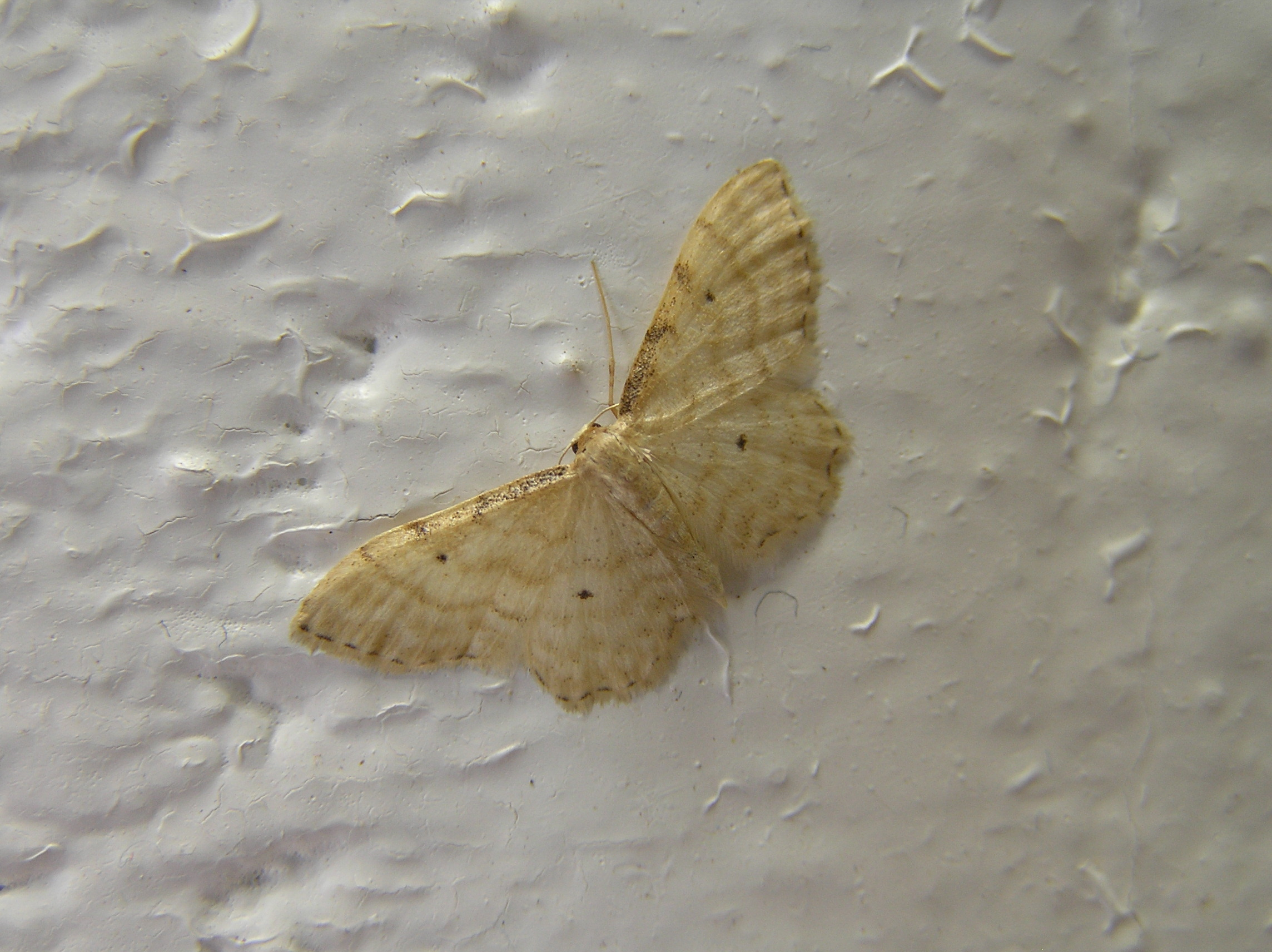

Scientific classification
- Kingdom: Animalia
- Phylum: Arthropoda
- Clade: Pancrustacea
- Class: Insecta
- Order: Lepidoptera
- Family: Geometridae
- Genus: Idaea
- Species: I. fuscovenosa

Binomial name
- Idaea fuscovenosa (Goeze, 1781)

= Idaea fuscovenosa =

Dwarf cream wave

Species of moth

Idaea fuscovenosa, the dwarf cream wave, is a moth of the family Geometridae. It is found in the Palearctic.

== Distribution ==
The species is widespread in Central and southern Europe. In the North the range extends up to England and Ireland, Denmark, South Sweden and the southern Baltic Sea region. It is found in the West of the Iberian Peninsula. East it extends to Asia minor, Ukraine, (European) Russia and the Caucasus. It occurs also on the large Mediterranean islands, Corsica (corsula Schawerda, 1929), Sardinia and Sicily. Earlier reports from North Africa are assigned today to Idaea bigladiata. In the North the species occurs from sea level is to about 500 meters asl. In the Southern Alps it rises 1000 m above sea level, in Corsica up to 2000 m above sea level.

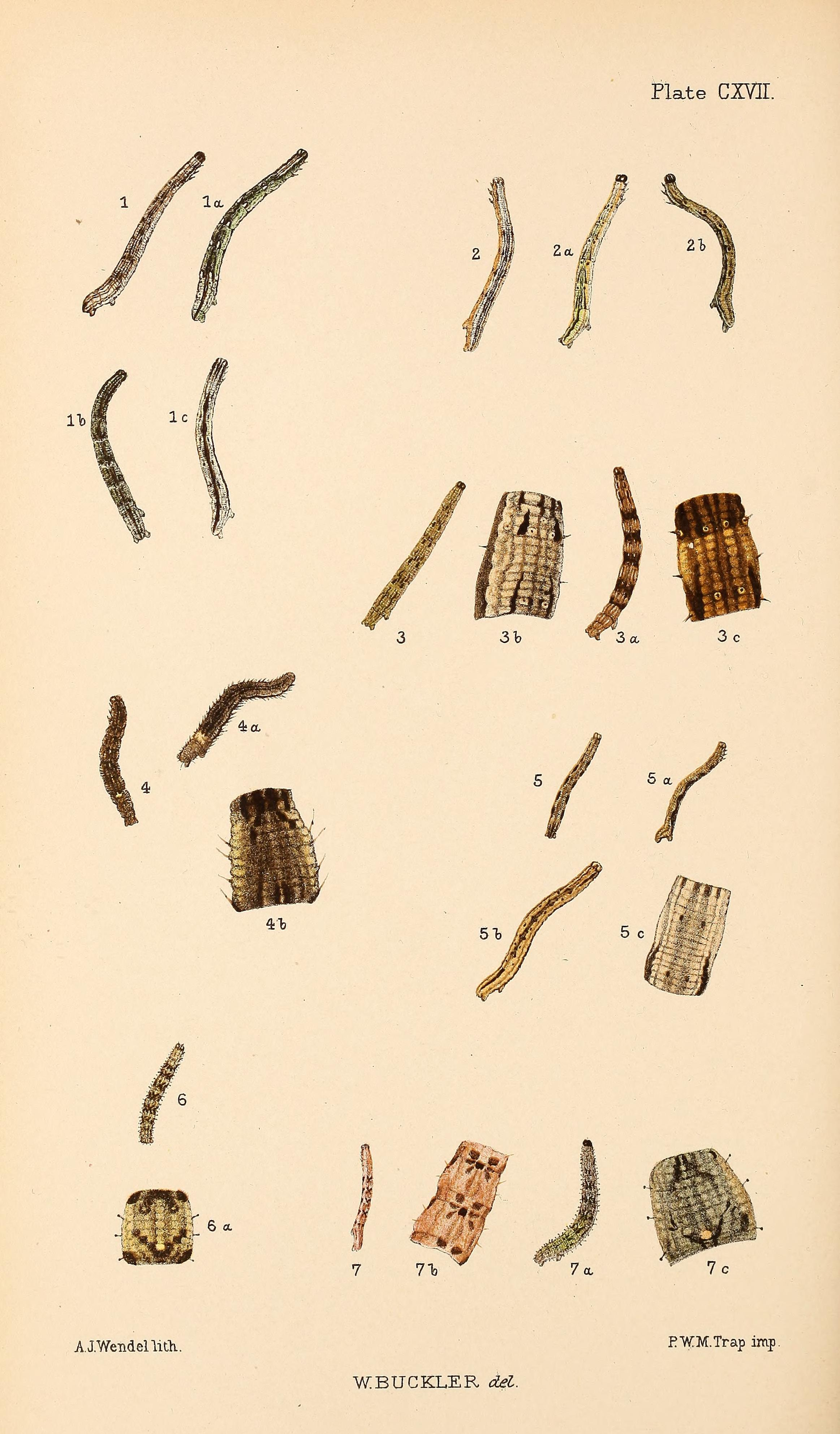
Fig 7, 7a Acidalia osseata Larvae in various stages 7b, 7c enlarged detail of segments 7, 7b A. osseata = Idaea fuscovenosa (Goeze, 1781) on dandelion, 7a, 7c A. interjectaria on dandelion

== Description ==
The species has a wingspan of 19–22 mm. The length of the forewings is 9–11 mm. The forewings are relatively wide, the rear edge of the hindwing is slightly concave between the median veins. The ground colour is whitish to light brown. The costa is often greyish brown on the basal half. The wavy crosslines are well developed and they end at the costa as black spots. There are two more wavy lines in the marginal field. Discal marks are almost always present on both fore and hindwings and black. The somewhat stumpy caterpillar is dull smoky brown, marbled and variegated with ochreous, the darker colour most in evidence in front, and the ochreous behind. There an ochreous line along the middle of the dorsum, and one along the region of the spiracles and white spots on rings 5–7.

== Biology ==
The adults fly in one generation from June to August.

The larvae feed on various types of moss, but also fallen leaves.

Idaea fuscovenosa prefer warm and dry habitats. In the North of the range the species is usually limited to sun-exposed hedge rows, dry forests and forest edges, grassy areas, gardens and uncultivated land.

== Notes ==
1. The flight season refers to the British Isles. This may vary in other parts of the range.
