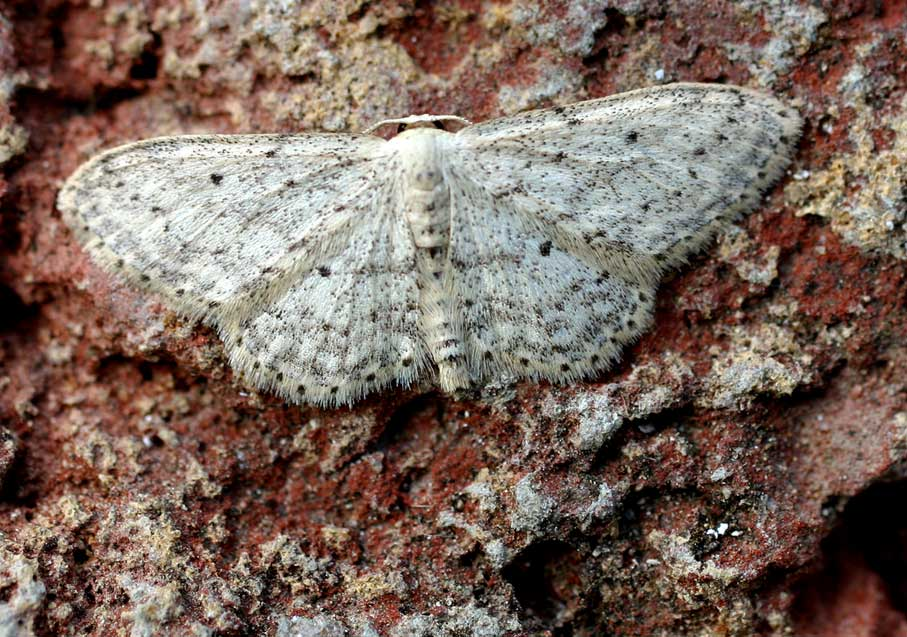

Scientific classification
- Kingdom: Animalia
- Phylum: Arthropoda
- Class: Insecta
- Order: Lepidoptera
- Family: Geometridae
- Genus: Idaea
- Species: I. seriata

Binomial name
- Idaea seriata (Schrank, 1802)

Synonyms
- Geometra virgularia Hübner, [1799]

= Small dusty wave =

Species of moth

The small dusty wave (Idaea seriata) is a moth of the family Geometridae first described by Franz von Paula Schrank in 1802. It is found throughout Western, Central and Northern Europe. In the north, its range extends as far as Denmark and southern Scandinavia. In the east its range extends as far as Russia (Moscow or Veliky Novgorod). Idaea seriata is replaced by the subspecies Idaea seriata canteneraria, from the north-east of Spain and the central and eastern Mediterranean (including the islands, except Crete) to the Crimean peninsula, while the western Mediterranean and the Balearic Islands are inhabited by the sister species Idaea minuscularia. Outside Europe it is found in eastern Algeria, Tunisia, Turkey, Cyprus, the Caucasus and the northwest of Transcaucasia. In Morocco and western Algeria, it is replaced by the sister species Idaea minuscularia. In the British Isles it is common in England and Wales but is only found in the eastern half of Scotland and it is rare in Ireland.

The species is very small (wingspan 19–21 mm) and is probably one of the least striking members of the whole family, being basically grey with all markings indistinct apart from the black discal spot typical of the genus.

== Description in Seitz ==
An extremely variable species, ranging from almost pure white forms without markings or with well expressed lines to unicolorous black-grey forms. The vertex of the head remains whitish in all the forms, the collar dark. The lines, when present, do not arise from enlarged costal spots, though not infrequently the costal extremity of the lines is a little blacker than the rest. The first line of the forewing is angled on the subcostal vein or at least strongly bent; it is thickened with dark marks on the veins. The median shade is thicker, not rarely rather strongly developed, often, on the contrary, quite obsolete even in forms in which the lines are sharply marked; it usually touches the cell-spot on the forewing and is always proximal to it on the hindwing. The postmedian is fine and grey, not itself conspicuous but marked with strong, coarse black spots on the veins; it stands rather near the distal margin and is incurved between the radials, then outcurved; the form of this line is best shown on the right forewing in our figure and may be compared to that which occurs in a higher degree of development in calunetaria. The pale subterminal line is slightly more strongly bent (or angled) inwards between the radials; it is often almost indistinguishable an account of the lack of dark shading accompanying it, but the dark shading may also be moderately or even very strong, sometimes almost filling the distal area and forming a dark border to the wings; this dark shading scarcely ever shows a tendency to break up into spots, herein differing markedly from incisaria [Idaea incisaria (Staudinger, 1892)], camparia [Idaea camparia (Herrich-Schäffer, 1852)], sodaliara [ Idaea sodaliaria Herrich-Schäffer, 1852 ], etc.; distal marginal line consisting of a series of black dashes of variable thickness, sometimes almost obsolete; fringe with more or less strong dark dots at base, opposite the vein-ends. Forewing beneath more or less suffused, often dark smoke-colour, the postmedian line and the cell-spot, however, usually well expressed; hindwing beneath white or whitish, marked (or unmarked) nearly according to the upper surface of the particular form. The typical seriata of Central and Northern Europe is more or less strongly dusted, thus appearing grey, but includes a wide range of subordinate variation, not only in the intensity of the dusting but also in the expression of the lines, the median shade or the dark bordering, either singly or in combination.

Either one or two broods are produced each year and the species can be seen on the wing any time from June to September, flying at night and sometimes coming to light.

The larva feeds on ivy and the species overwinters in this form.

1. The flight season refers to the British Isles. This may vary in other parts of the range.

== Subspecies ==
- Idaea seriata canteneraria
- Idaea seriata seriata
