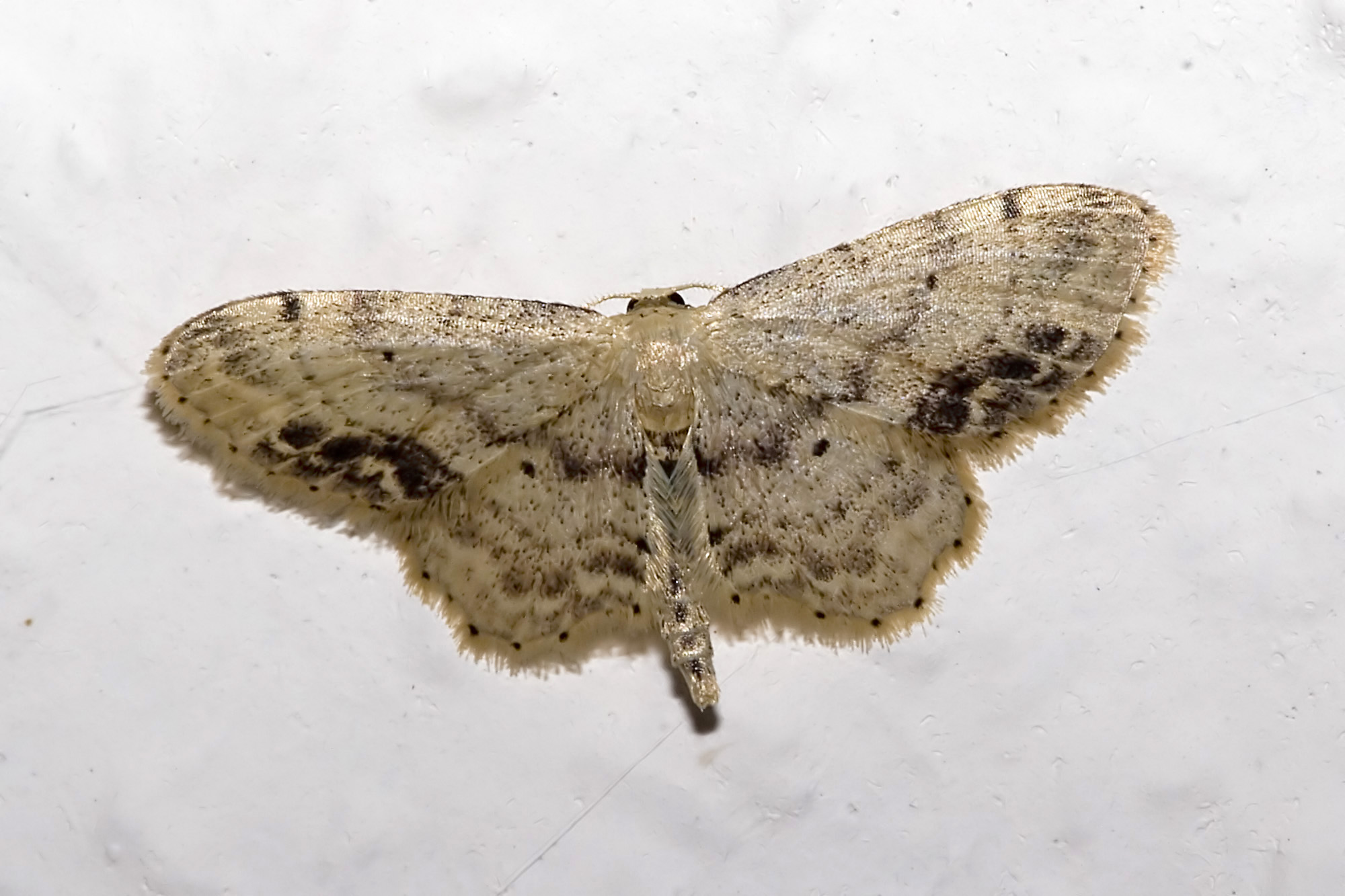

Scientific classification
- Kingdom: Animalia
- Phylum: Arthropoda
- Clade: Pancrustacea
- Class: Insecta
- Order: Lepidoptera
- Family: Geometridae
- Genus: Idaea
- Species: I. dimidiata

Binomial name
- Idaea dimidiata (Hufnagel, 1767)

= Idaea dimidiata =

Single-dotted wave

Species of moth

Idaea dimidiata, the single-dotted wave, is a moth of the family Geometridae. It is a Holarctic species.

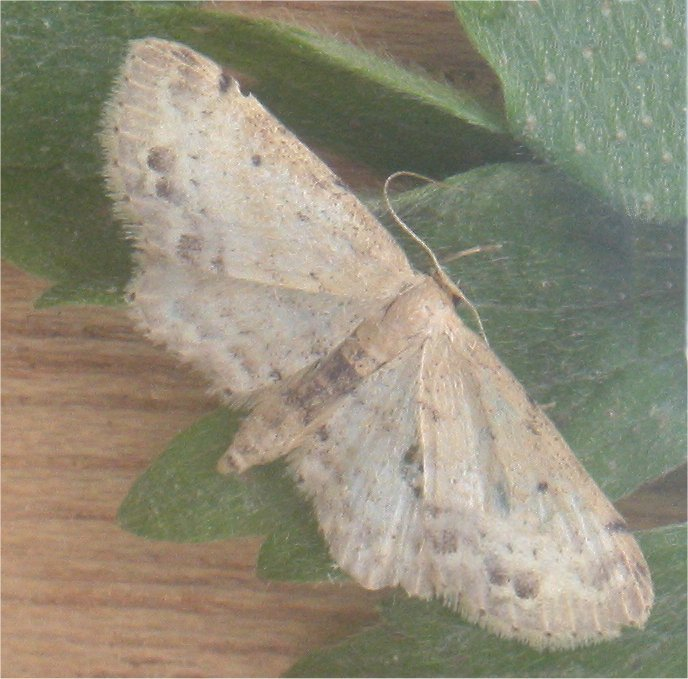

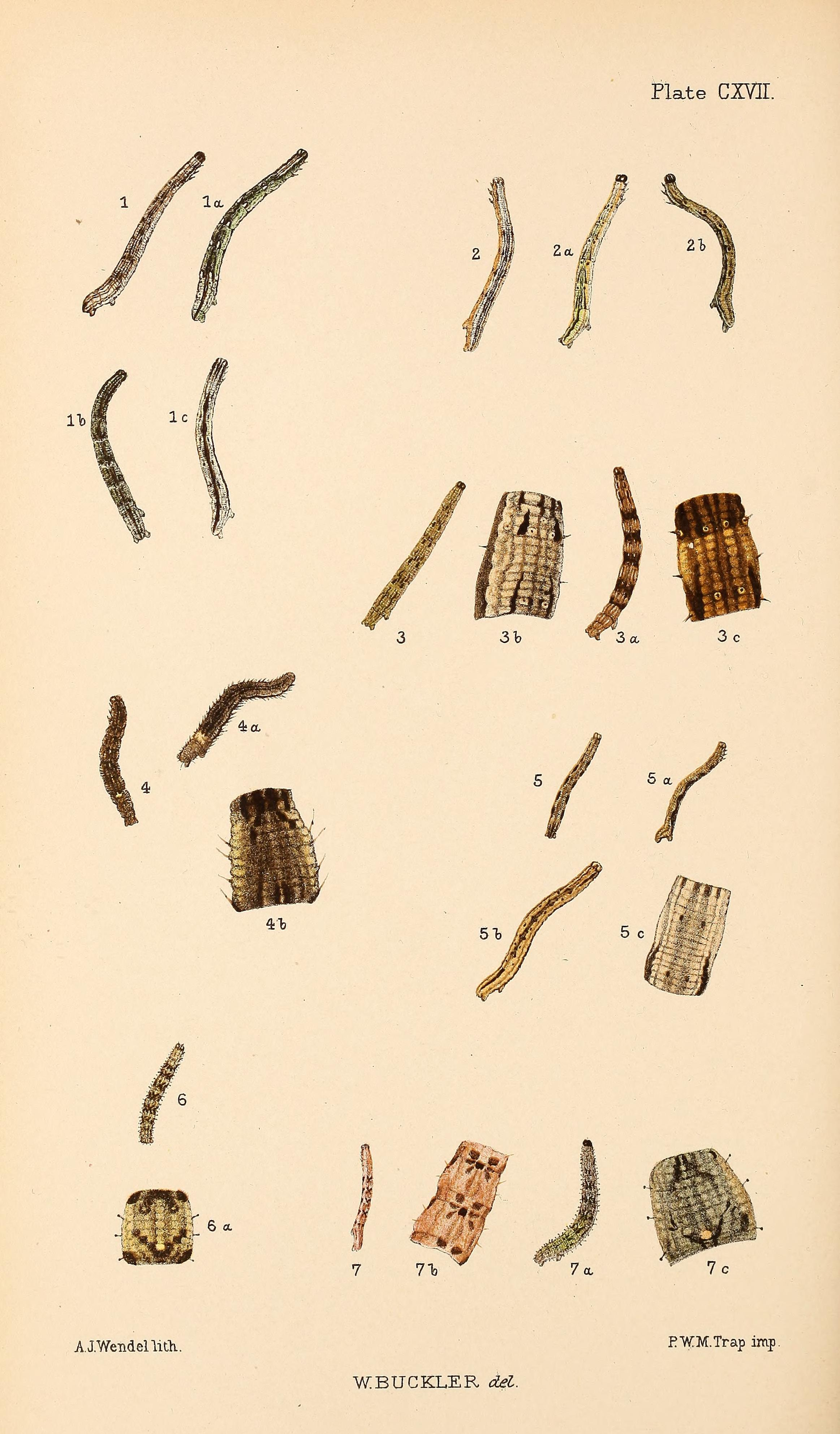
Fig 2,2a,2b Larvae after final moult

== Description ==
The species has a wingspan of 13–18 mm. The ground colour of the wings is brownish yellow, brownish white to slightly reddish white. The pattern elements are dark grey to dark brown. The median band and the two crosslines can be incomplete or interrupted. They are marked by so-called costal stains on the front wing at the costa. There is a light wavy line, which is limited mainly to the inside edge and marked on both sides by dark stains in the marginal field. The fore and hindwings have black discal flecks, which are occasionally significantly weaker on the forewings. Marginal stains are connected by a thin line.The larva is long and thin, grey-brown, with a V-shaped dark spot on each body segment.

== Distribution ==
The species occurs in the Western Palearctic and in the Nearctic. The species is widespread in West, South and Central Europe. In the North the range extends to South Scandinavia, and East to the Urals. Idaea dimidiata is found on almost all islands of the Mediterranean.

Outside Europe it is found in Morocco and Northwestern Turkey, the Caucasus and Transcaucasia, from North Iran it extends to Afghanistan and Central Asia. In Cyprus, Turkey and the Levant in the South dimidiata antitaurica replaces dimidiata dimidiata, which also occurs in Canada and the most northern regions of the United States of America.

== Biology ==
The adults fly at night from June to August, occasionally later, and are attracted to light.

The species prefers damp locations such as marshy woodland, fens and river banks.

1. The flight season refers to the British Isles. This may vary in other parts of the range.
