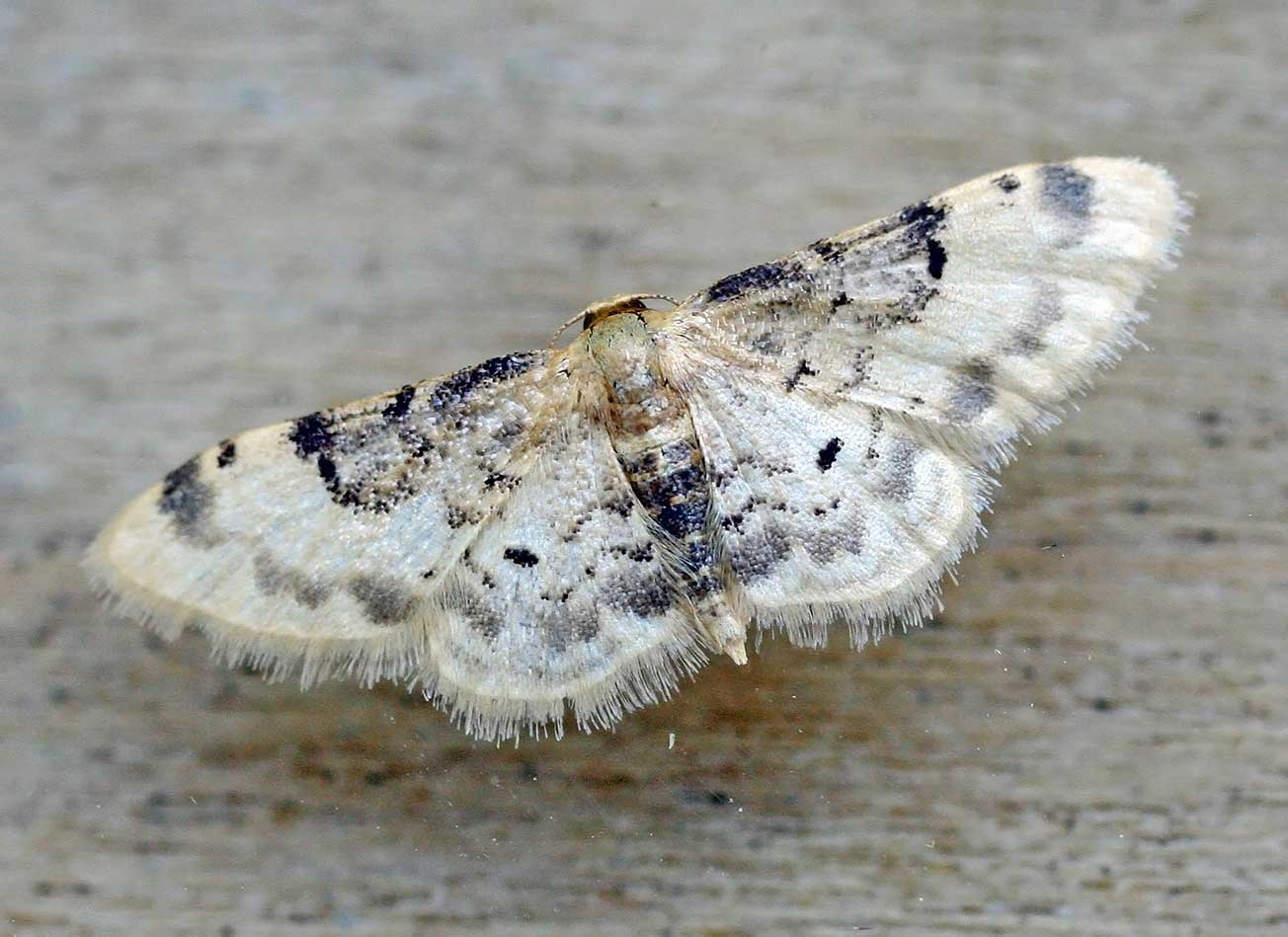

Scientific classification
- Kingdom: Animalia
- Phylum: Arthropoda
- Clade: Pancrustacea
- Class: Insecta
- Order: Lepidoptera
- Family: Geometridae
- Genus: Idaea
- Species: I. filicata

Binomial name
- Idaea filicata (Hübner, 1798)

= Idaea filicata =

Species of moth

Idaea filicata is a moth of the family Geometridae. It is found in Southern Europe and the Near East.

The species has a wingspan of 12–21 mm. The adults fly at night from May to September in two to three generations.
