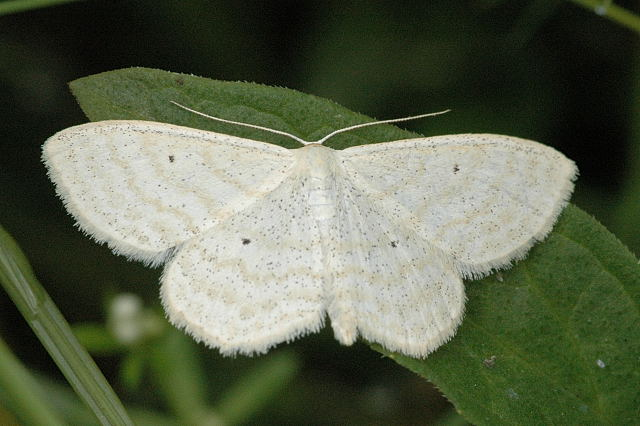

Scientific classification
- Kingdom: Animalia
- Phylum: Arthropoda
- Clade: Pancrustacea
- Class: Insecta
- Order: Lepidoptera
- Family: Geometridae
- Genus: Scopula
- Species: S. immutata

Binomial name
- Scopula immutata (Linnaeus, 1758)

Synonyms
- Phalaena immutata Linnaeus, 1758; Phalaena pallidata Borkhausen, 1794

= Scopula immutata =

Species of geometer moth in subfamily Sterrhinae

Scopula immutata, the lesser cream wave, is a moth of the family Geometridae. It was described by Carl Linnaeus in his 1758 10th edition of Systema Naturae. It is found throughout Europe.

== Distribution ==
A typical temperate to boreal Palearctic species. In Europe it ranges from the west coast of France and the British Isles to the Urals. In the north it extends from central Scandinavia, south to central Italy and south Bulgaria. This latter occurrence is isolated from the main populations and is limited to higher regions. There are also isolated, very much small occurrences in northern Portugal and north-eastern Spain, as well as evidence in Corsica and Sardinia. However, these findings must still be confirmed. Outside Europe the species spreads east across the Caucasus, Kazakhstan, southern Siberia, Mongolia and the Russian Far East and Sakhalin.

The species is moisture loving and is therefore found in humid forests, swamps, bogs, wet meadows and along rivers. In the Alps and southern Europe it rises up to 1,200 metres (3,900 ft), rarely even higher (max. 1,850 meters).

== Description ==
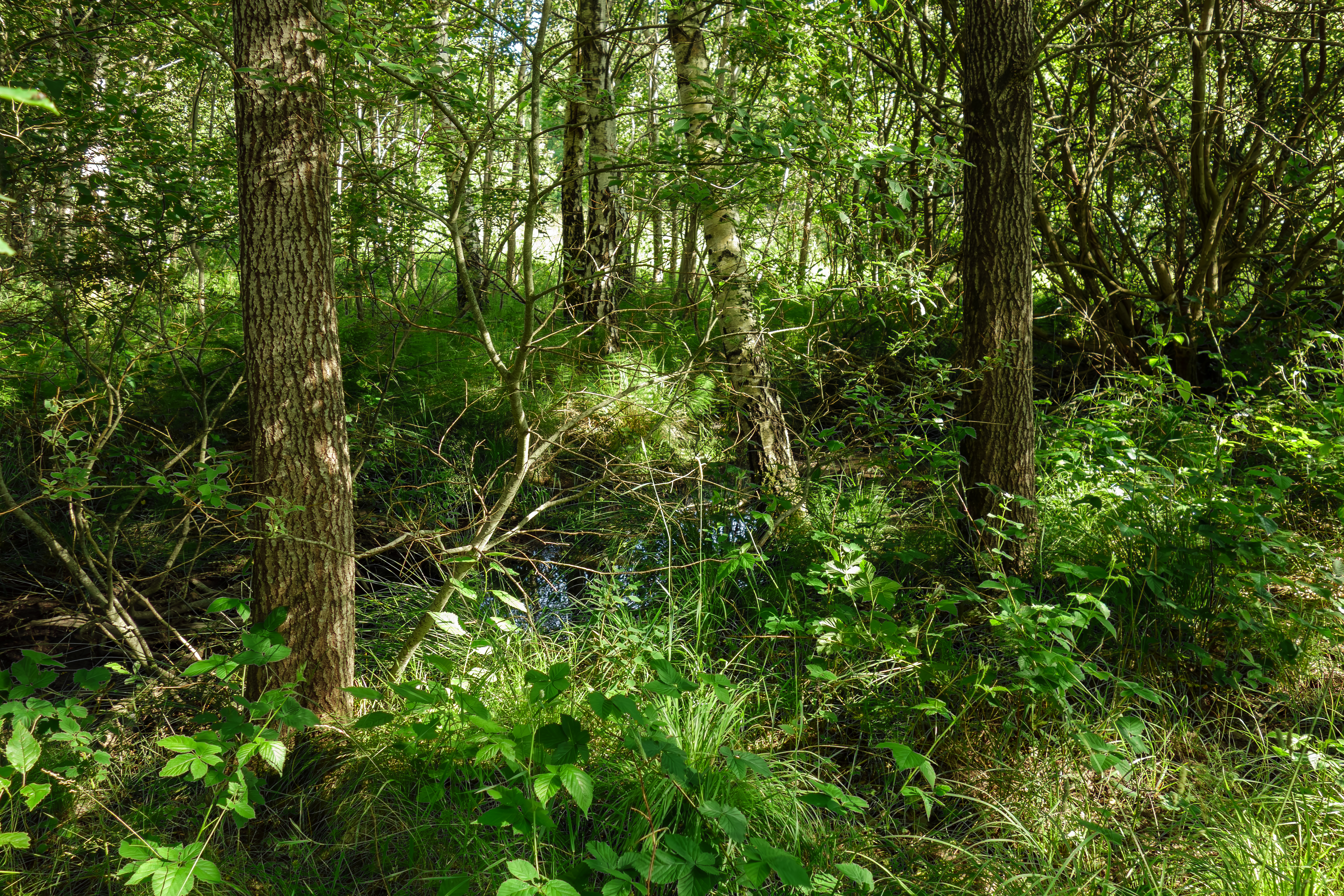
Lesser cream wave habitat

The wingspan is 24–27 millimetres (0.94–1.06 in). The length of the forewings is 12–13 millimetres (0.47–0.51 in). The second generation in the south and moths in the north of the range can reach only 19–23 millimetres (0.75–0.91 in). The ground colour is silk white with yellow dusting of varying intensity (particularly in the males). Drought and high temperatures during the development of the pupae induce more yellowish moths with pronounced pattern. The wavy crosslines are yellowish, ochreous to light brown in colour (with a fine scattering of black scales). Typically there are four crosslines and a wavy marginal line (often wide and blurred). Discal flecks are always present, but they can be much weaker on the front wings. Marginal stains are occasional, and then quite small and inconspicuous. See also Prout. It is similar to Scopula floslactata, but can be distinguished by its more rounded forewings and black discal spot.

The egg is almost perfectly cylindrical, the ends only slightly rounded with about 15 powerful longitudinal ribs, the transverse ribs exceedingly fine and about 15-18 in number. It is delicate greenish-yellow, becoming after 2 days pale pink with scattered crimson spots. The larva is rather slender, nearly cylindrical, tapering towards the head, the subsegmentation distinct; grey-brown with fine pale medio-dorsal line, its fine dark edges thickened into black dashes at the ends of the segments; an ill-defined dark supra-spiracular line and a rather pale lateral stripe containing the black spiracles. The pupa is pale brown with the wing-cases more greenish.

The moth flies in one generation from June to August in western Europe.

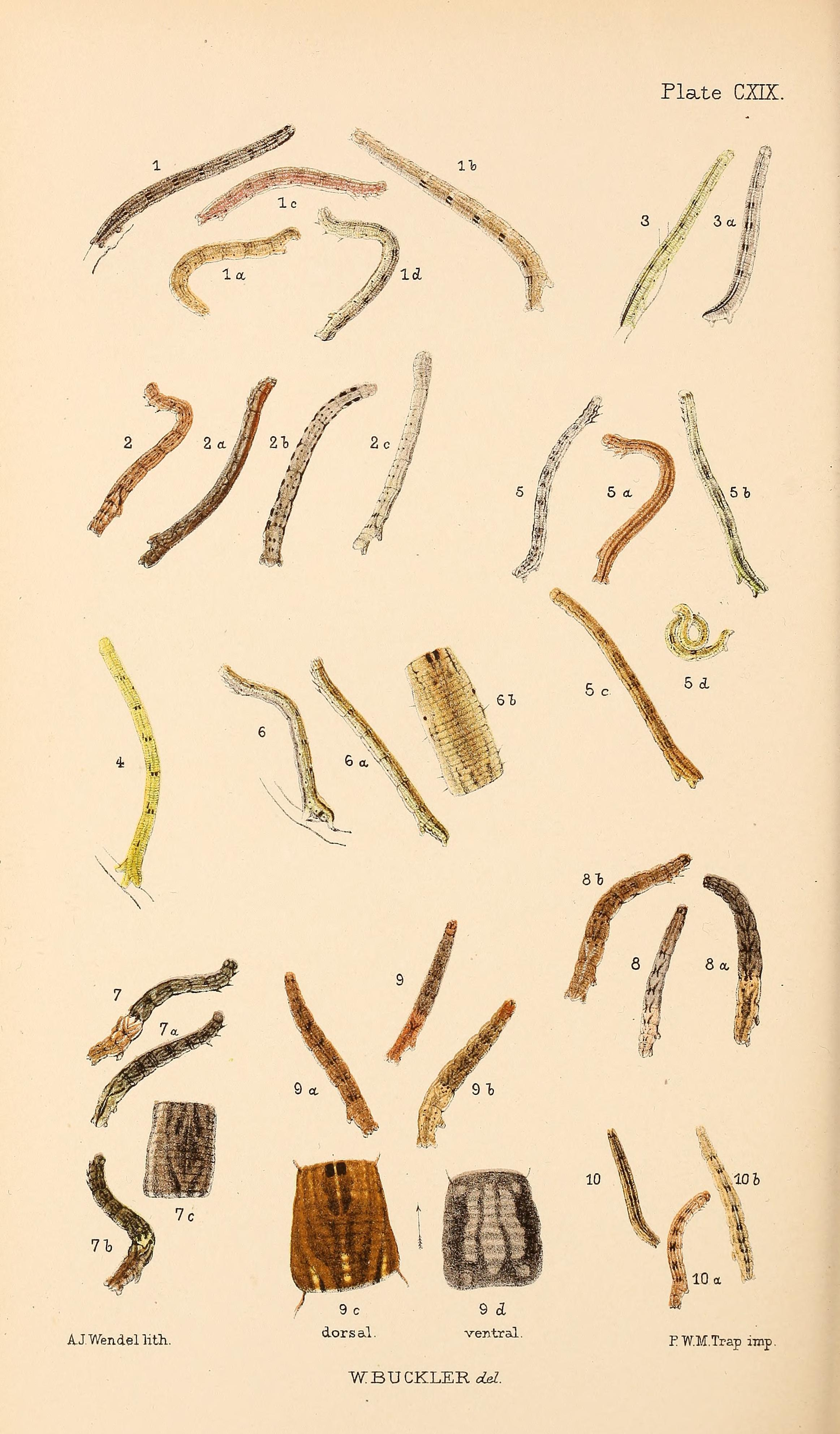
1,1a. 1b.1c, 1d larvae in various stages

The larvae feed on meadowsweet and valerian. The moth sits by day among rank grass and is easily disturbed.
