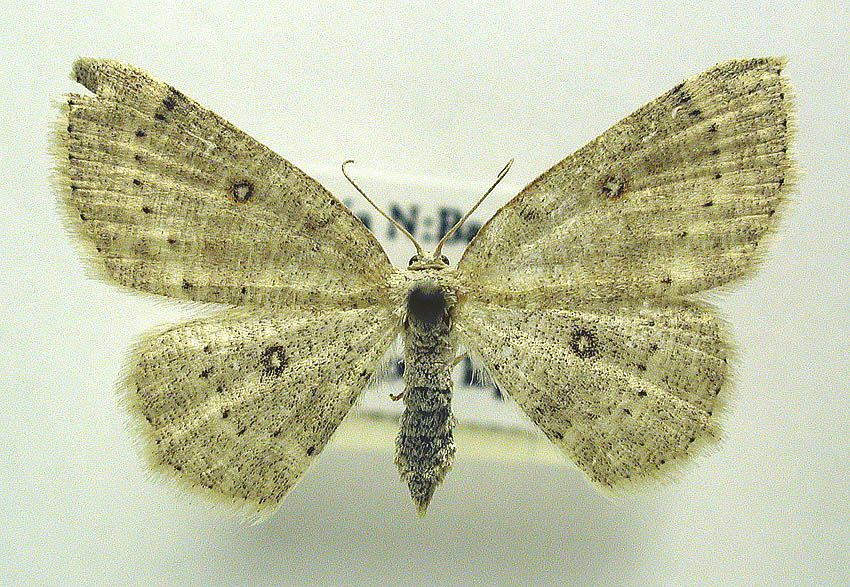
- Female
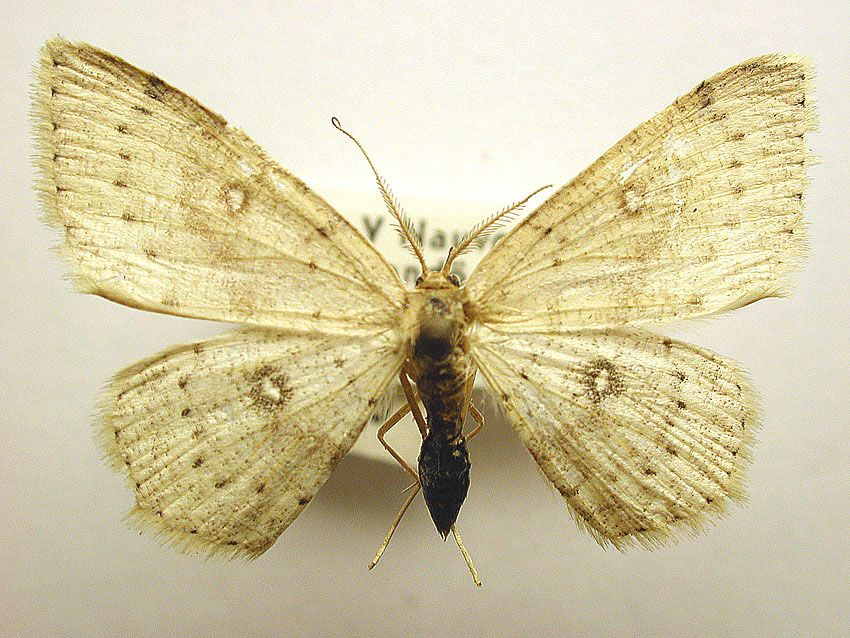
- Male

Scientific classification
- Kingdom: Animalia
- Phylum: Arthropoda
- Clade: Pancrustacea
- Class: Insecta
- Order: Lepidoptera
- Family: Geometridae
- Genus: Cyclophora
- Species: C. albipunctata

Binomial name
- Cyclophora albipunctata (Hufnagel, 1767)

Synonyms
- Phalaena albipunctata Hufnagel, 1767; Phalaena circularia Fabricius, 1798; Geometra pupillaria Brahm, 1791; Phalaena suspensa Retzius, 1783; Ephyra vusarmana Walker, 1861; Zonosoma griseolata Staudinger, 1897; Cosymbia coreana Bryk, 1949; Cosymbia excellens Bryk, 1942

= Cyclophora albipunctata =

Species of moth

Cyclophora albipunctata, the birch mocha, is a moth of the family Geometridae. The species was first described by Johann Siegfried Hufnagel in 1767. It is found in the Palearctic. The southern boundary runs westward along the French Atlantic coast and to the British Isles and north of the Alps. In the east, the species ranges to the Pacific Ocean (Russian Far East). South of the northern Alps line, it is found at some high elevation areas and mountains. In the Pyrenees, the Massif Central, the southern Alps, the northern Dinaric Alps, in the western and northern Carpathians, in northern Turkey and the Caucasus. In the north, the range extends up to the Arctic Circle. In the Far East the nominate subspecies is replaced by Cyclophora albipunctata griseolata Staudinger, 1897.

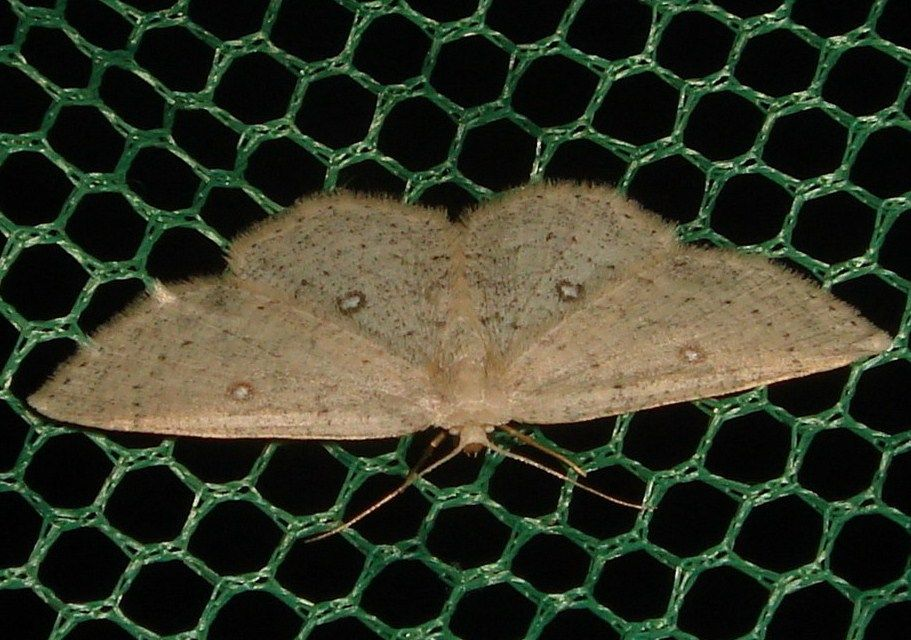

The wingspan is 20–25 mm. The apex of the forewing is slightly pointed. The ground colour is usually white, or whitish grey to light brown. Some specimens are over dusted with reddish. The pattern is very variable. Interior and exterior crosslines are almost always in a series of points or may be almost extinguished. Slight points are usually found on the costa: the costa can be over dusted dark in the basal half. A median band can be quite clearly present but also virtually absent. Margin stains are almost always developed, significant and mostly flowing into each other, slightly darker in the margin field. The discal spots are developed as a dark, white centred rings. These can be also slightly elliptical, or be reduced to simple, slightly reddish stains. The discal spots of the forewings are often bordered with brown red, but if present, the discal spots of the hindwings are, however, mostly black.

The larvae feed on Betula species, including B. verrucosa, B. pubescens, B. nana and B. pendula.

== Subspecies ==
- Cyclophora albipunctata albipunctata (Europe, Turkey, Transcaucasia, western Siberia to Mongolia)
- Cyclophora albipunctata griseolata (Staudinger, 1897) (south-eastern Siberia, Amur, Korea, Japan)
