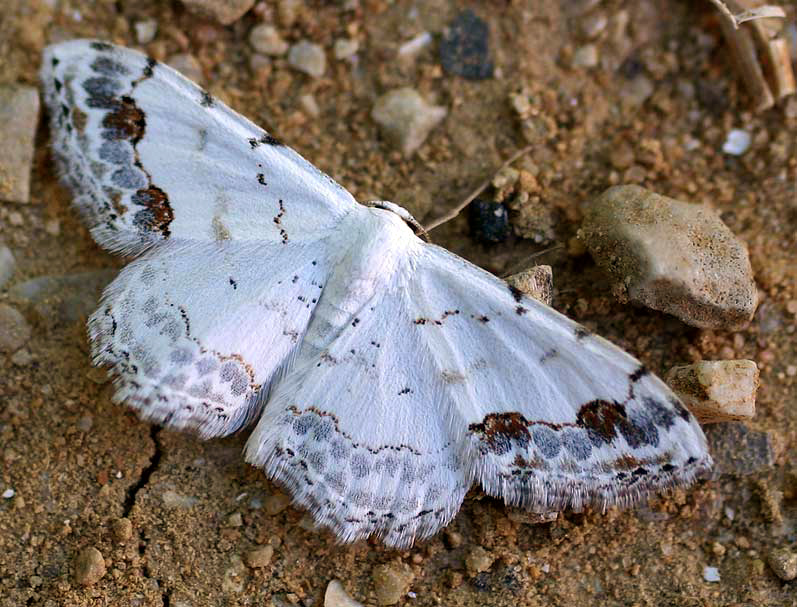

Scientific classification
- Kingdom: Animalia
- Phylum: Arthropoda
- Class: Insecta
- Order: Lepidoptera
- Family: Geometridae
- Genus: Scopula
- Species: S. decorata

Binomial name
- Scopula decorata (Denis & Schiffermüller, 1775)

Synonyms
- Geometra decorata Denis & Schiffermuller, 1775; Phalaena caerulata Gmelin, 1790; Phalaena cinerata Fabricius, 1781; Geometra decoraria Hubner, 1799; Geometra ornataria Esper, 1806; Geometra violata Thunberg, 1784; Idaea congruata Zeller 1847; Scopula congruata; Acidalia decorata leukiberica Wehrli, 1927; Acidalia violata ablutata Dannehl, 1927; Acidalia armeniaca Thierry-Mieg, 1916

= Scopula decorata =

Species of geometer moth in subfamily Sterrhinae

Scopula decorata, the middle lace border, is a moth of the family Geometridae. It is found throughout Europe.

The wingspan is 20–23 millimetres (0.79–0.91 in). The moth flies in two generations from the end of May to August.

The larva feeds on thyme.

== Subspecies ==
- Scopula decorata decorata
- Scopula decorata armeniaca (Thierry-Mieg, 1916)
- Scopula decorata congruata (Zeller, 1847)
- Scopula decorata drenowskii Sterneck, 1941
- Scopula decorata eurhythma Prout, 1935
- Scopula decorata przewalskii Viidaleppp, 1975

Scopula decorata congruata is treated as a full species by some authors.
