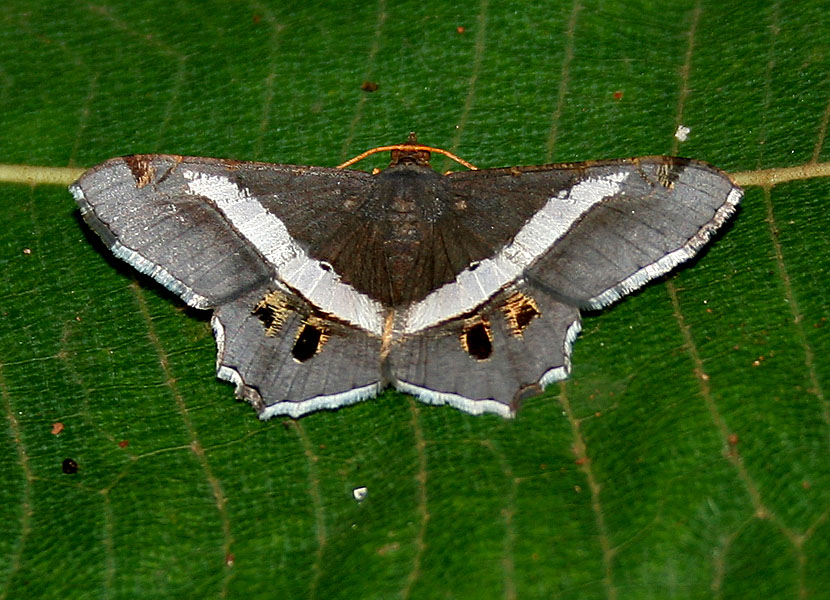
- Chiasmia species from Ennominae

Scientific classification
- Kingdom: Animalia
- Phylum: Arthropoda
- Clade: Pancrustacea
- Class: Insecta
- Order: Lepidoptera
- Superfamily: Geometroidea
- Family: Geometridae; Leach, 1815

Subfamilies
- Alsophilinae (disputed); Archiearinae; Desmobathrinae (disputed); Ennominae; Geometrinae; Larentiinae (but see text); Oenochrominae; Orthostixinae; Sterrhinae

= Geometer moth =

Geometer moth Temporal range: Priabonian to Recent 35–0 Ma

Family of insects

The geometer moths are moths belonging to the family Geometridae of the insect order Lepidoptera, the moths and butterflies. Their scientific name derives from the Ancient Greek γεω (geo) (derivative form of γῆ or γαῖα "the earth"), and μέτρον (métron) "measure" in reference to the way their larvae, or inchworms, appear to measure the earth as they move along in a looping fashion. Geometridae is a very large family, containing around 23,000 described species; over 1400 species from six subfamilies are indigenous to North America alone. A well-known member is the peppered moth, Biston betularia, which has been the subject of numerous studies in population genetics. Several other geometer moths are notorious pests.

== Caterpillars ==
The name "Geometridae" ultimately derives from Latin geometra from Greek γεωμέτρης ("geometer", "earth-measurer"). This refers to the means of locomotion of the larvae or caterpillars, which lack the full complement of prolegs seen in other caterpillars, with only two or three pairs at the posterior end instead of the usual five pairs. Equipped with appendages at both ends of the body, a caterpillar clasps with its front legs and draws up the hind end, then clasps with the hind end (prolegs) and reaches out for a new front attachment, creating the impression that it measures its journey. The caterpillars are accordingly called "loopers", "spanworms", or "inchworms" after their characteristic looping gait. The cabbage looper and soybean looper are not inchworms but caterpillars of a different family. In many species of geometer moths, the inchworms are about 25 mm (1.0 in) long. They tend to be green, grey, or brownish and hide from predators by fading into the background or resembling twigs. When disturbed, many inchworms stand erect and motionless on their prolegs, further increasing this resemblance. Some have humps or filaments, or cover themselves in plant material. They are gregarious and are generally smooth. Some eat lichen, flowers, or pollen, while some, such as the Hawaiian species of the genus Eupithecia, are carnivorous. Certain destructive inchworm species are referred to as "cankerworms".

In 2019, the first geometrid caterpillar in Baltic amber was discovered by German scientists. Described under Eogeometer vadens, it measured about 5 mm (0.20 in) and was estimated to be 44 million years old, dating back to the Eocene epoch. It was described as the earliest evidence for the subfamily of Ennominae, particularly the tribe Boarmiini.

Locomotion of a looper

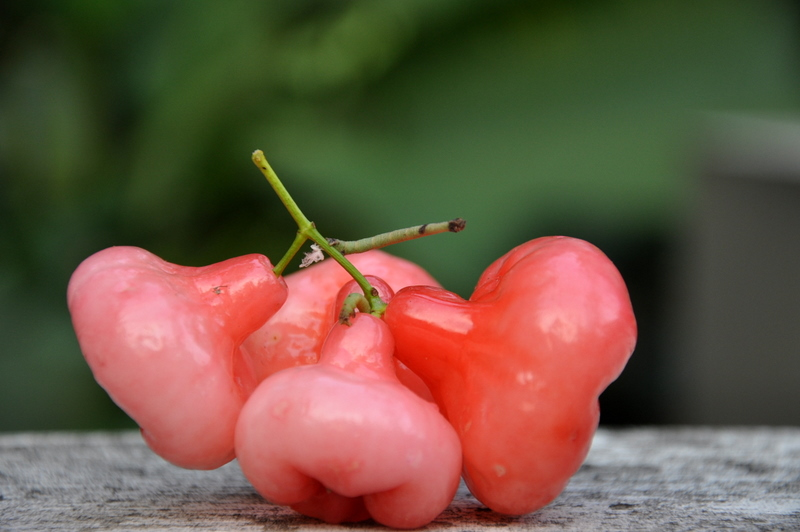
A geometrid caterpillar camouflaged as a broken twig

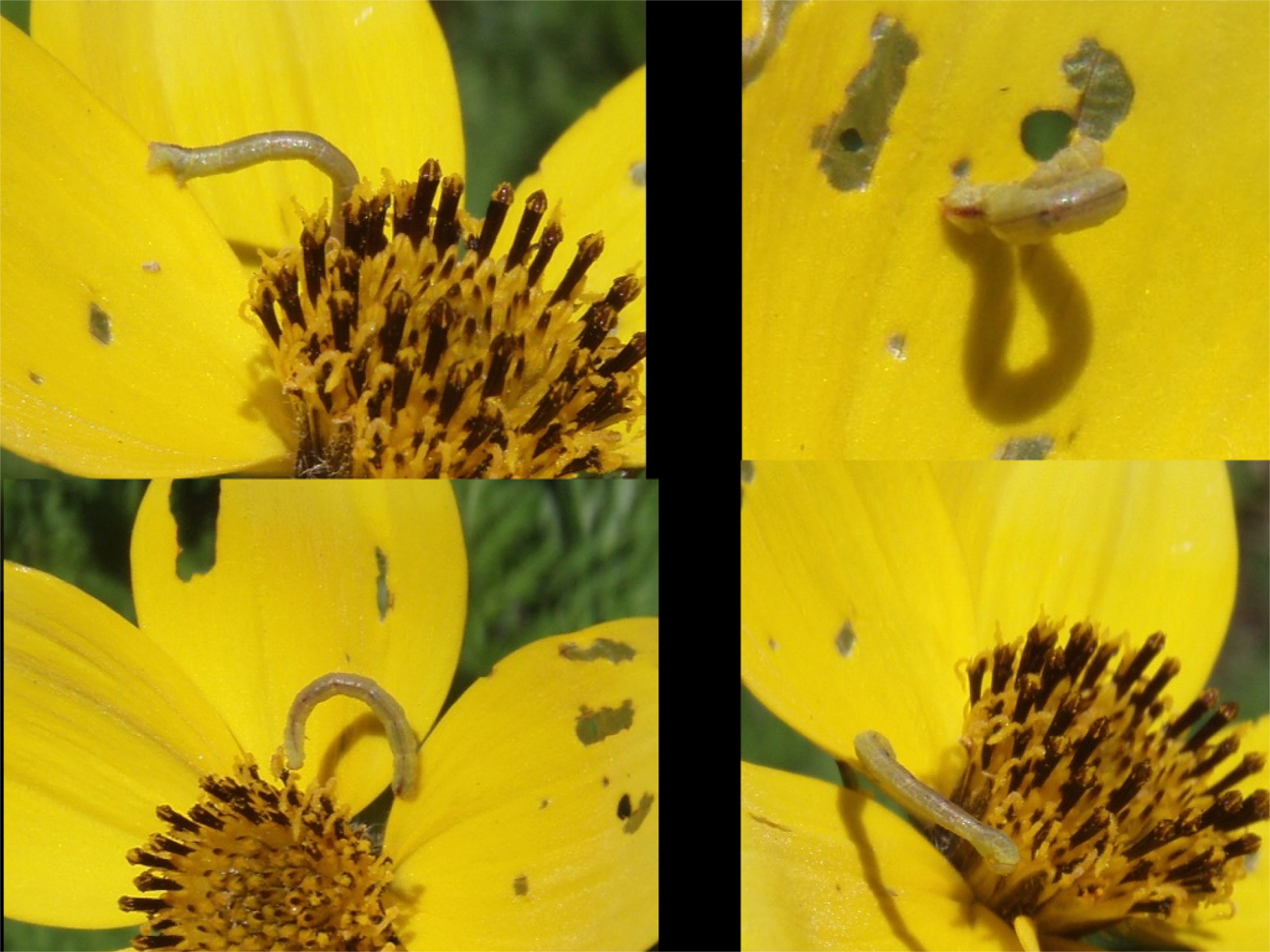
Caterpillar locomotion

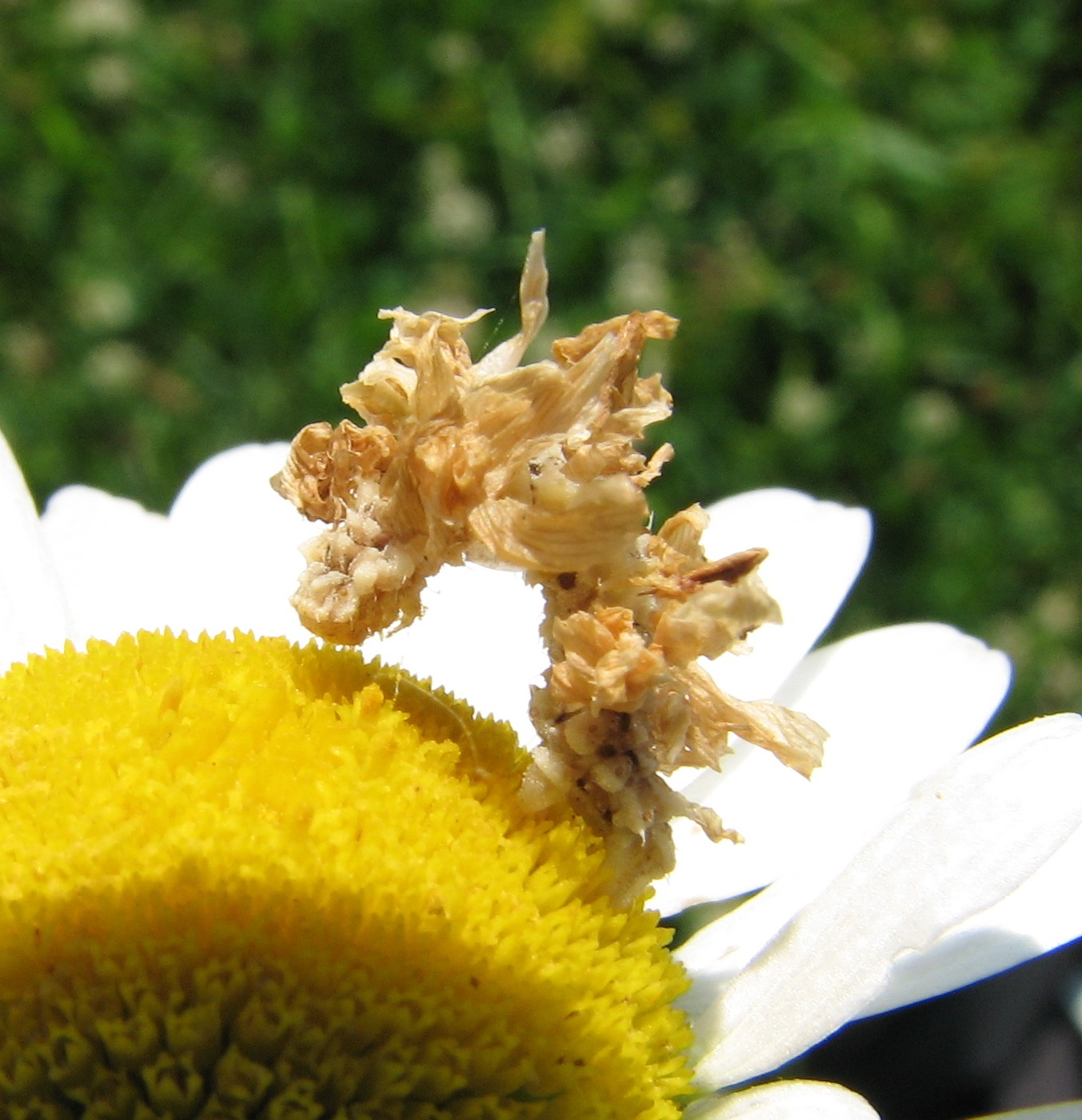
Synchlora aerata caterpillar dressed with pieces of flowers as camouflage

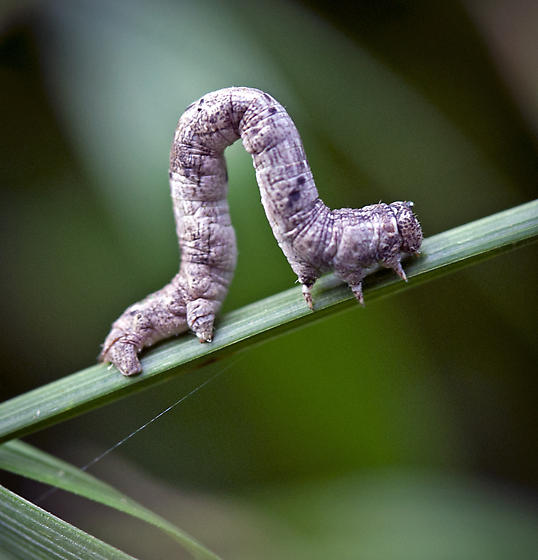
Geometrid moth (Geometridae) "inchworm" caterpillar

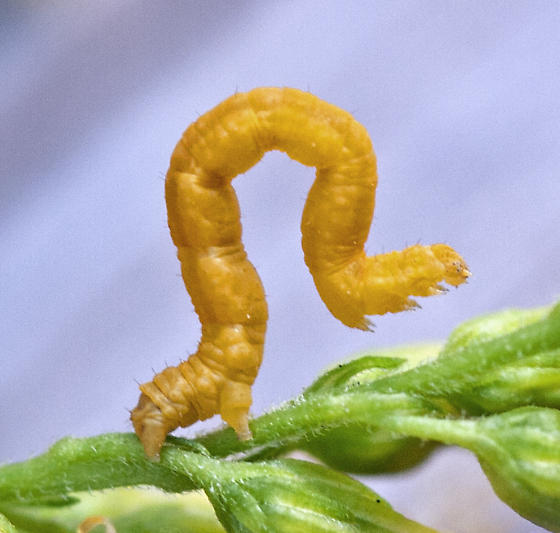
Geometrid moth (Geometridae) "inchworm" caterpillar

== Adults ==
Many geometrids have slender abdomens and broad wings which are usually held flat with the hindwings visible. As such, they appear rather butterfly-like, but in most respects they are typical moths. The majority fly at night. They possess a frenulum to link the wings, and the antennae of the males are often feathered. They tend to blend into the background, often with intricate, wavy patterns on their wings. In some species, females have reduced wings (e.g. winter moth and fall cankerworm). Most are of moderate size, about 3 cm (1.2 in) in wingspan, but a range of sizes occur, from 10–50 mm (0.39–1.97 in), and a few (e.g., Dysphania species) reach an even larger size. They have distinctive paired tympanal organs at the base of the abdomen (these are absent in flightless females).

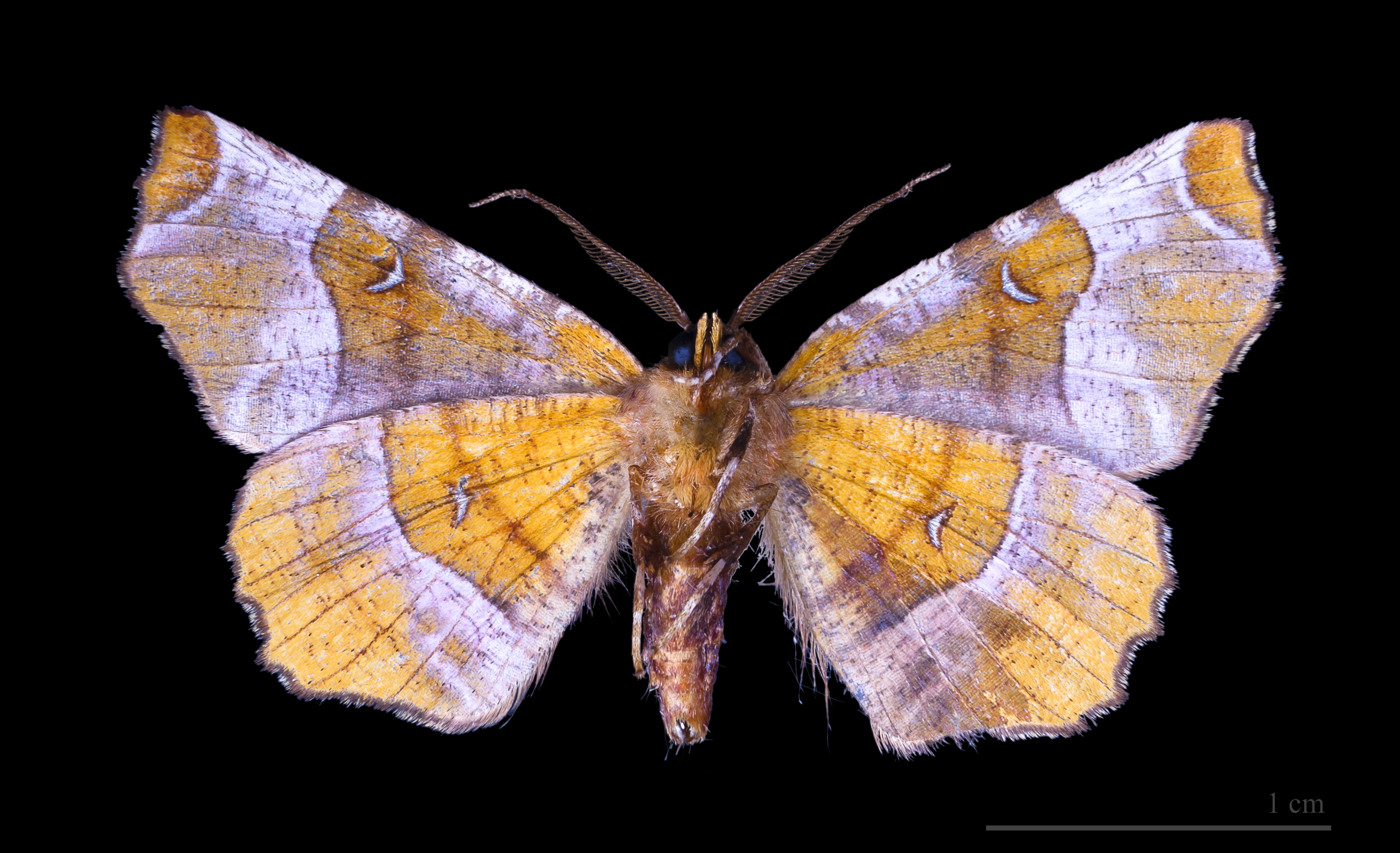
Selenia tetralunaria species from Ennominae

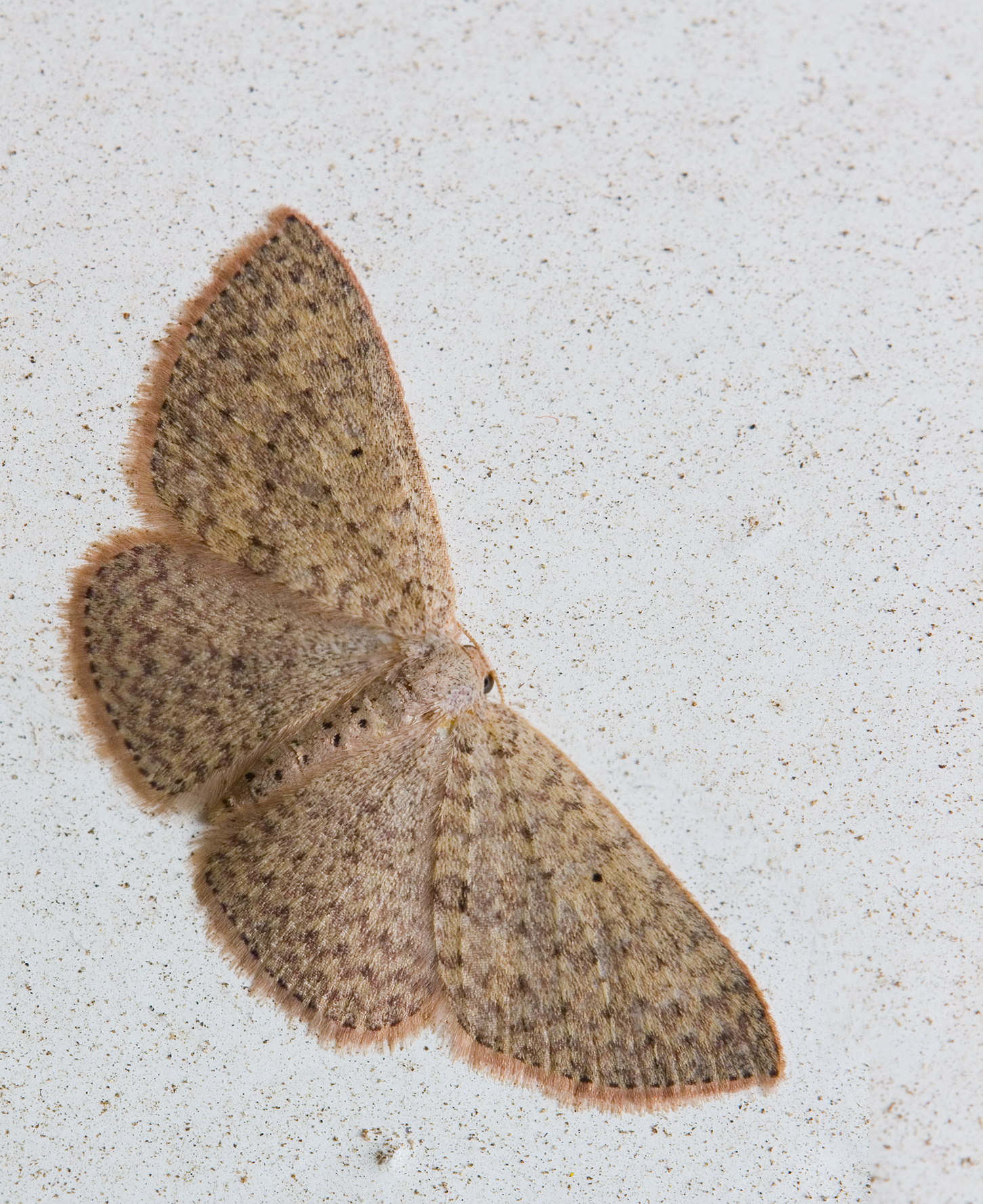
Scopula species

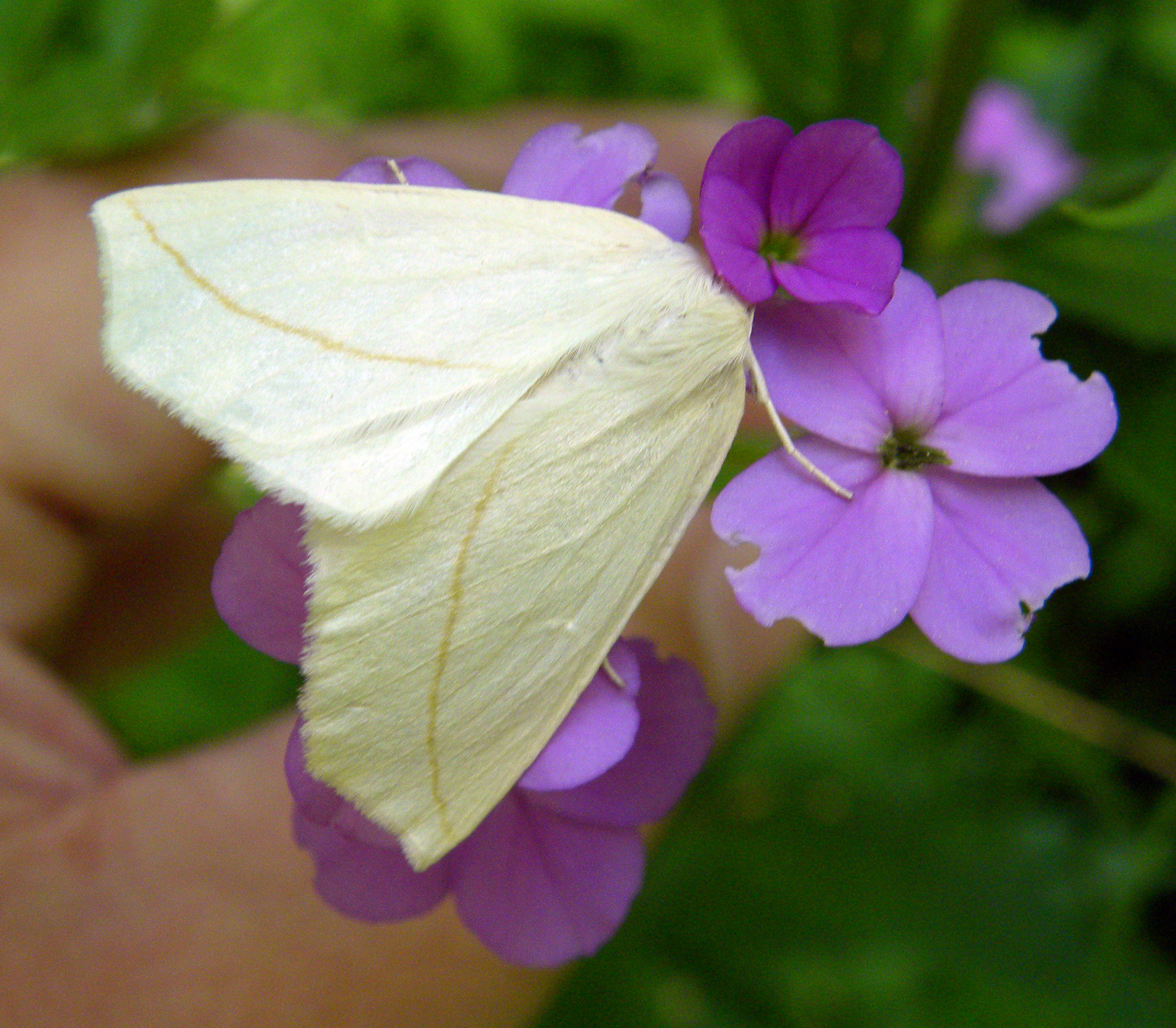
Tetracis cachexiata in the US state of Ohio

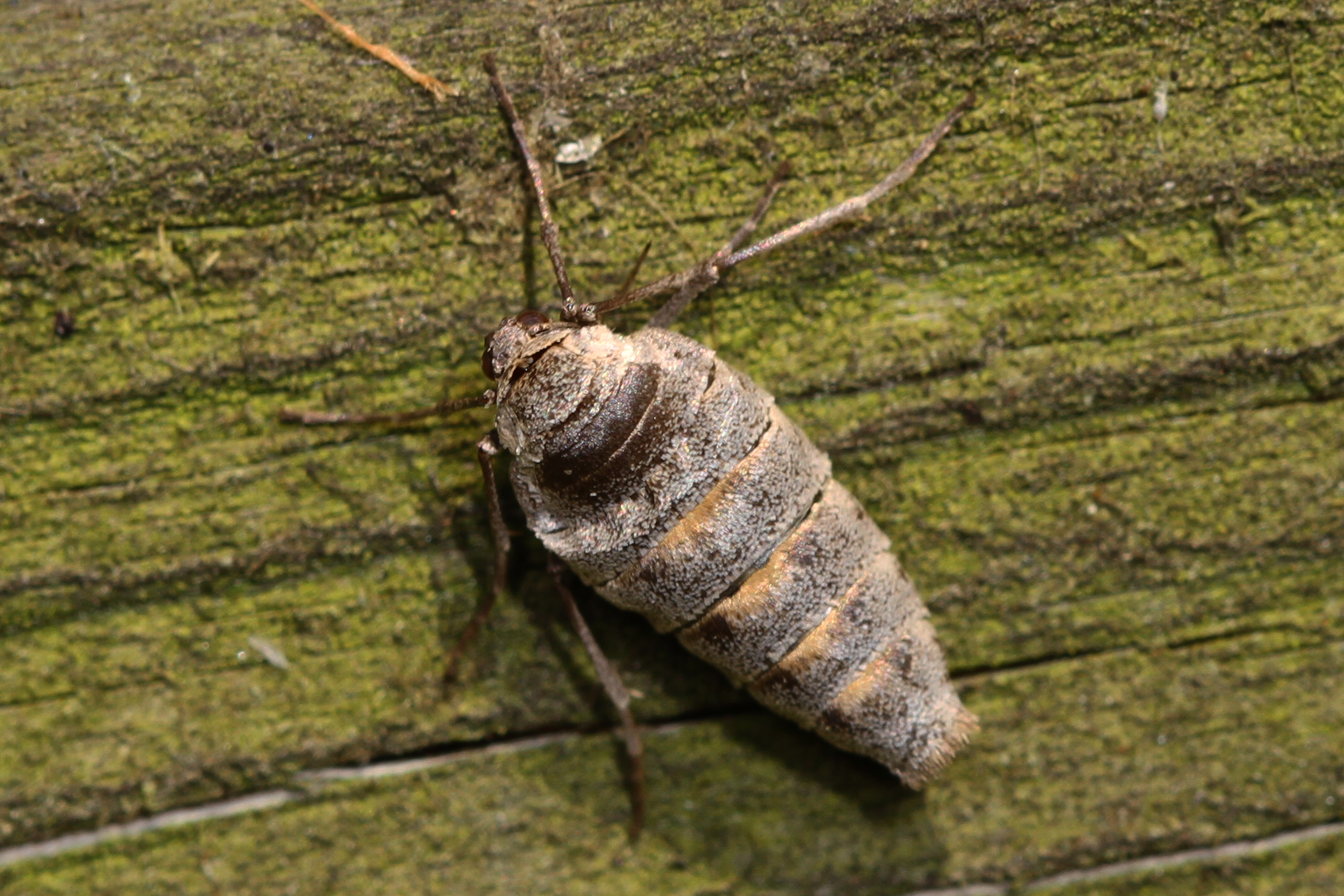
Alsophila pometaria, wingless adult female

== Systematics ==
Molecular phylogenetic indicate that the Geometridae are composed of eight large clades, which roughly correspond to the traditional subfamilies within the group. However, the Oenochrominae are polyphyletic, falling in three clades within the tree.

Traditionally, the Archiearinae were held to sister to the other geometer moth lineages, as their caterpillars have well-developed prolegs. However, some species that were traditionally placed in the Archiearinae actually appear to belong to other subfamilies; thus, it may be that in a few cases, the prolegs which were originally lost in the ancestral geometer moths re-evolved as an atavism.

Moreover, later work suggested that the Larentiinae are actually the sister lineage to all other groups in the family, as indicated by their numerous plesiomorphies and DNA sequence data; they may even be considered a separate family of Geometroidea.

Molecular phylogenetics with broad taxonomic sampling indicates that a clade consisting of the Sterrhinae and some members of the Oenochrominae is sister to all remaining lineages in the Geometridae.

The placement of the example species follows a 1990 systematic treatment; it may be outdated.

Larentiinae – about 5,800 species, includes the pug moths, mostly temperate, might be a distinct family.

Sterrhinae – about 2,800 species, mostly tropical, might belong to same family as the Larentiinae.

- Birch mocha, Cyclophora albipunctata
- False mocha, Cyclophora porata
- Maiden's blush, Cyclophora punctaria
- Riband wave, Idaea aversata
- Small fan-footed wave, Idaea biselata
- Single-dotted wave, Idaea dimidiata
- Small scallop, Idaea emarginata
- Idaea filicata
- Dwarf cream wave, Idaea fuscovenosa
- Rusty wave, Idaea inquinata
- Purple-bordered gold, Idaea muricata
- Bright wave, Idaea ochrata
- Least carpet, Idaea rusticata
- Small dusty wave, Idaea seriata
- Purple-barred yellow, Lythria cruentaria (formerly in Larentiinae)
- Vestal, Rhodometra sacraria
- Common pink-barred, Rhodostrophia vibicaria
- Middle lace border, Scopula decorata
- Cream wave, Scopula floslactata
- Small blood-vein, Scopula imitaria
- Lewes wave, Scopula immorata
- Lesser cream wave, Scopula immutata
- Mullein wave, Scopula marginepunctata
- Zachera moth, Chiasmia defixaria
- Blood-vein, Timandra comae
- Eastern blood-vein, Timandra griseata

Desmobathrinae – pantropical

Geometrinae – emerald moths, about 2,300 named species, most tropical

Archiearinae – twelve species; holarctic, southern Andes and Tasmania, though the latter some seem to belong to the Ennominae, larvae have all the prolegs but most are reduced.

- Infant, Archiearis infans (Möschler, 1862)
- Scarce infant, Leucobrephos brephoides (Walker, 1857)

Oenochrominae – in some treatments used as a "wastebin taxon" for genera that are difficult to place in other groups

Alsophilinae – a few genera, defoliators of trees, might belong in the Ennominae, tribe Boarmiini

- March moth, Alsophila aescularia
- Fall cankerworm, Alsophila pometaria

Ennominae – about 9,700 species, including some defoliating pests, global distribution

- †Eogeometer vadens

Geometridae genera incertae sedis include:

- Dichromodes
- Homoeoctenia
- Nearcha

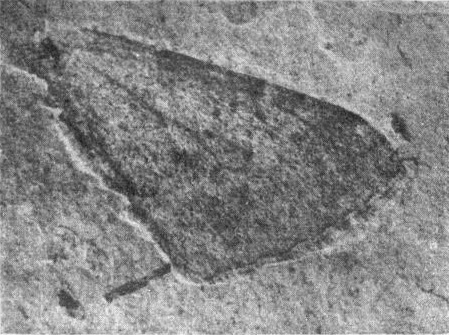
Hydriomena? protrita holotype forewing

Fossil Geometridae taxa include:

- †Eogeometer Fischer, Michalski & Hausmann, 2019
- †Hydriomena? protrita Cockerell, 1922 (Priabonian, Florissant Formation, Colorado)
- †Geometridites Clark et al., 1971
