= Godonela =

Genus of moths

Godonela was a genus of moths in the family Geometridae. It is now considered a synonym of Semiothisa, though many of the species formerly placed here are now in Chiasmia

== Species ==
- Godonela aestimaria (Hübner, 1809)
- Godonela albibrunnea Warren
- Godonela albipuncta (Warren, 1894)
- Godonela avitusaria (Walker, 1860)
- Godonela bornusaria Holloway, 1993
- Godonela eleonora (Cramer, [1780])
- Godonela emersaria (Walker, 1861)
- Godonela fluidata (Warren, 1897)
- Godonela glareosa (Turner, 1917)
- Godonela goldiei (Druce, 1882)
- Godonela gratularia (Walker, 1861)
- Godonela hygies (Prout, 1932)
- Godonela hypomochla (Turner, 1917)
- Godonela margaritis (Meyrick, 1892)
- Godonela mutabilis (Warren, 1897)
- Godonela nora (Walker, 1861)
- Godonela ozararia (Walker, 1860)
- Godonela pluviata (Fabricius, 1798)
- Godonela rectistrigaria (Herrich-Schäffer, [1854])
- Godonela suriens (Strand, 1912)
- Godonela syriacaria (Staudinger, 1871)
- Godonela tessellata (Warren, 1899)
- Godonela translineata (Walker, 1866)
- Godonela vacuna (Druce, 1889)
- Godonela variegata (Warren, 1896)
