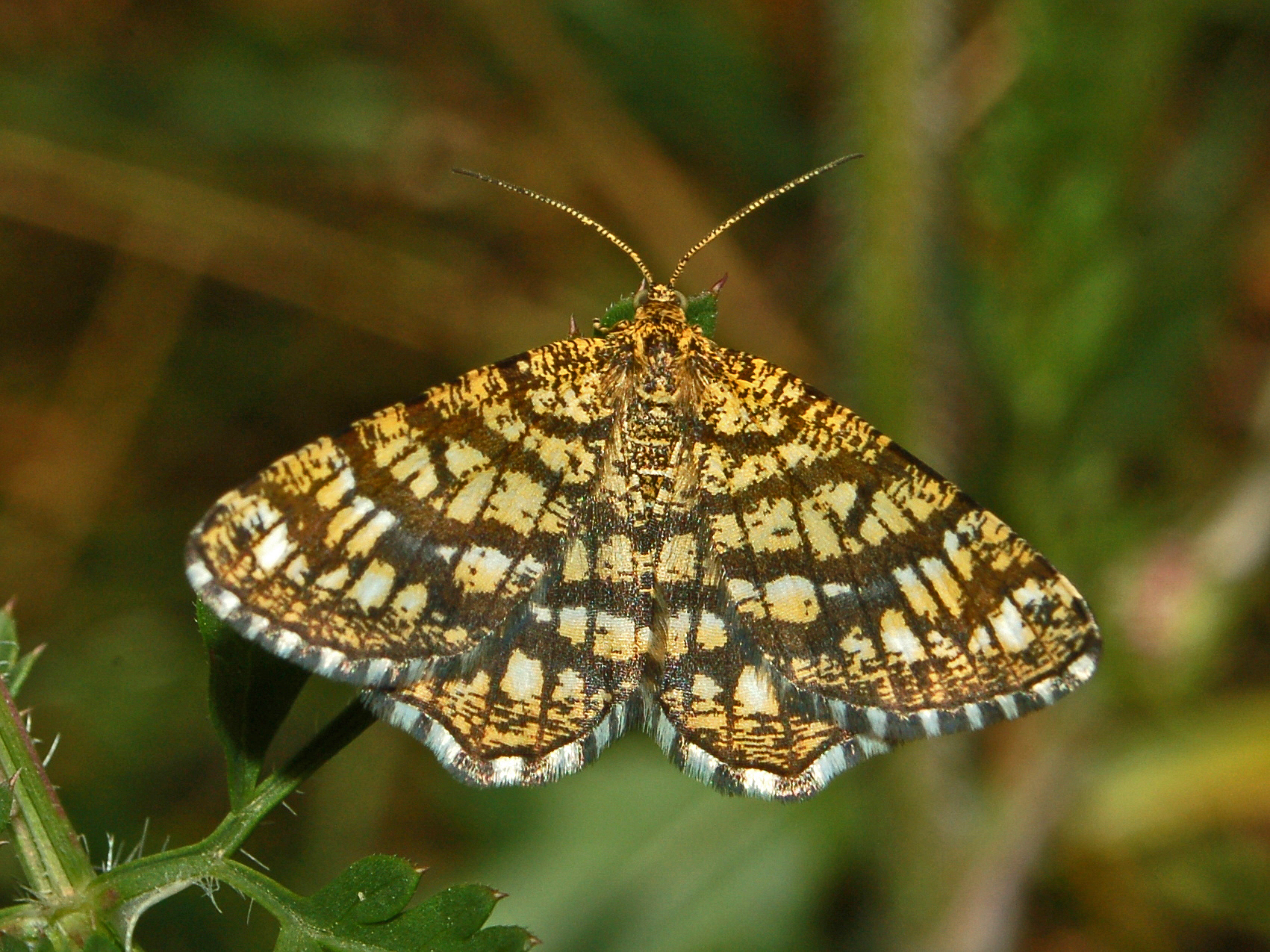
- Upperside
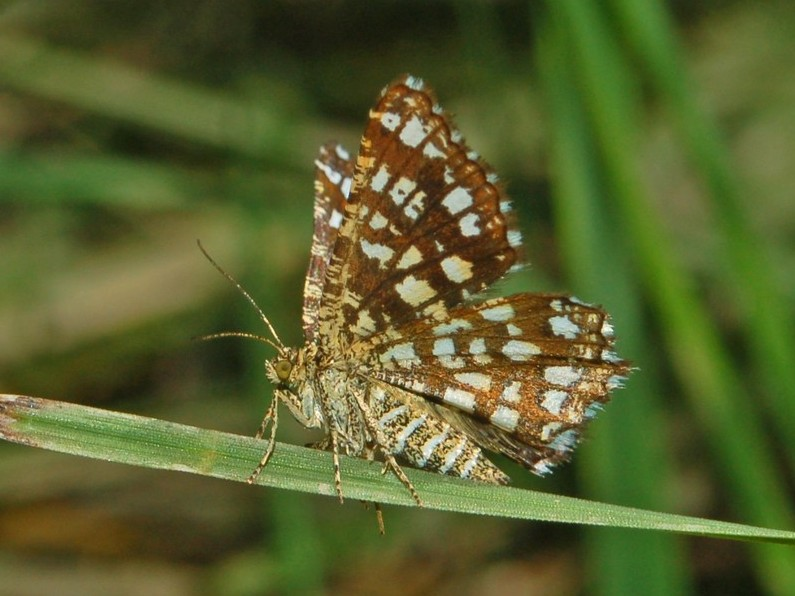
- Underside

Scientific classification
- Kingdom: Animalia
- Phylum: Arthropoda
- Clade: Pancrustacea
- Class: Insecta
- Order: Lepidoptera
- Family: Geometridae
- Genus: Chiasmia
- Species: C. clathrata

Binomial name
- Chiasmia clathrata (Linnaeus, 1758)

Synonyms
- List: Phalaena clathrata Linnaeus, 1758; Geometra cancellaria Hübner, [1809]; Phasiane clathrata nivea Rocci, 1923; Semiothisa clathrata tschangkuensis Wehrli, 1940; Chiasmia clathrata vanderbana Wehrli, 1940; Phalaena decussata Schrank, 1802; Phalaena radiata Haworth, 1809; Phalaena retialis Scopoli, 1763

= Latticed heath =

Species of moth

The latticed heath (Chiasmia clathrata) is a moth of the family Geometridae, belonging to the subfamily Ennominae, placed in the tribe Macariini. The genus was erected by Carl Linnaeus in his 1758 10th edition of Systema Naturae.

== Taxonomy ==
The current placement of the latticed heath in the genus Chiasmia follows from the revision by Malcolm J. Scoble (2002) of the tribe Macariini, when he showed that true Semiothisa species were restricted to the Americas. There are a number of described subspecies. Molecular work has confirmed the placement of the species within Chiasmia.

== Subspecies ==
Subspecies include:

- Chiasmia clathrata clathrata (Linné)
- Chiasmia clathrata centralasiae (Krulikowski, 1911)
- Chiasmia clathrata djakonovi (Kardakoff, 1928)
- Chiasmia clathrata kurilata (Bryk, 1942)

== Distribution and habitat ==
This species can be found throughout Europe, the Near East, North Africa, and east through Russia, Siberia, Amur River, northern Iran, Kazakhstan, China, Korea to Japan. It is a fairly common species in the British Isles. These moths inhabit a range of open areas, including grassland, moorland, and waste ground.

== Description ==
=== Adult ===
Chiasmia clathrata has a wingspan of 20–25 mm. In this rather variable species the background colour of the wings varies from yellowish to white, with a network of brown lines (hence its common name). These lines vary in thickness and sometimes the wings are almost entirely dark brown.

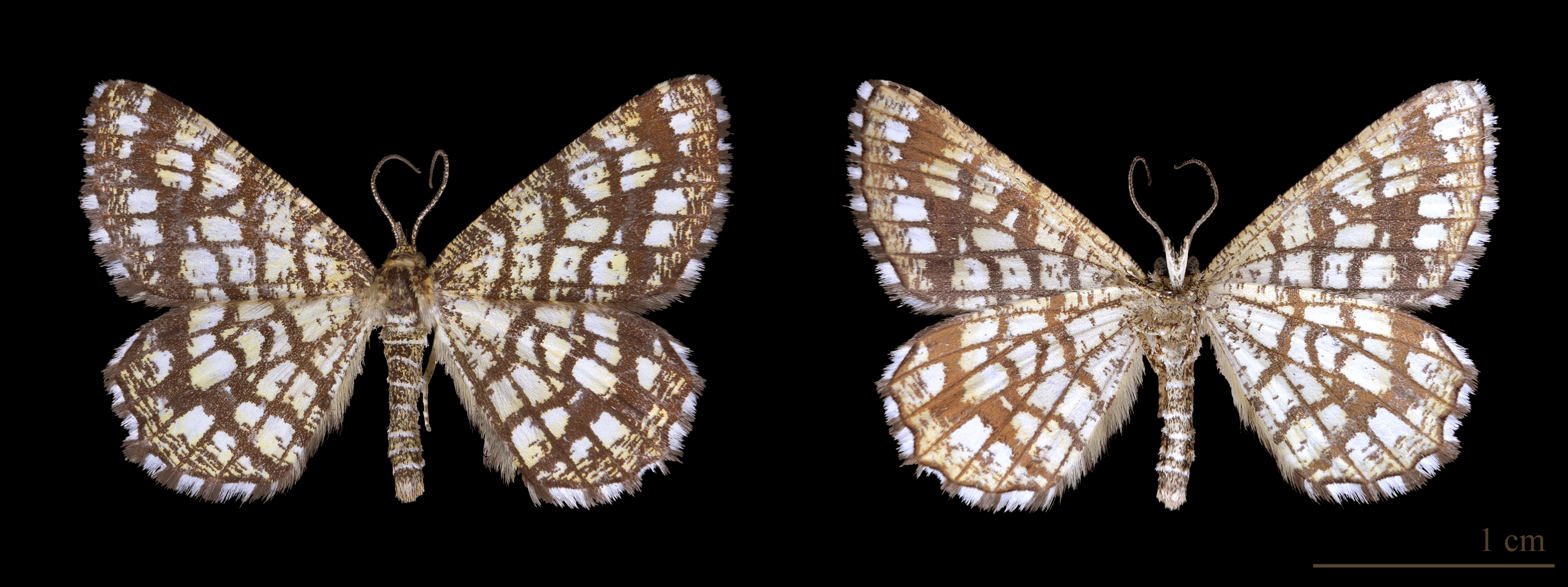
Female – dorsal and ventral sides

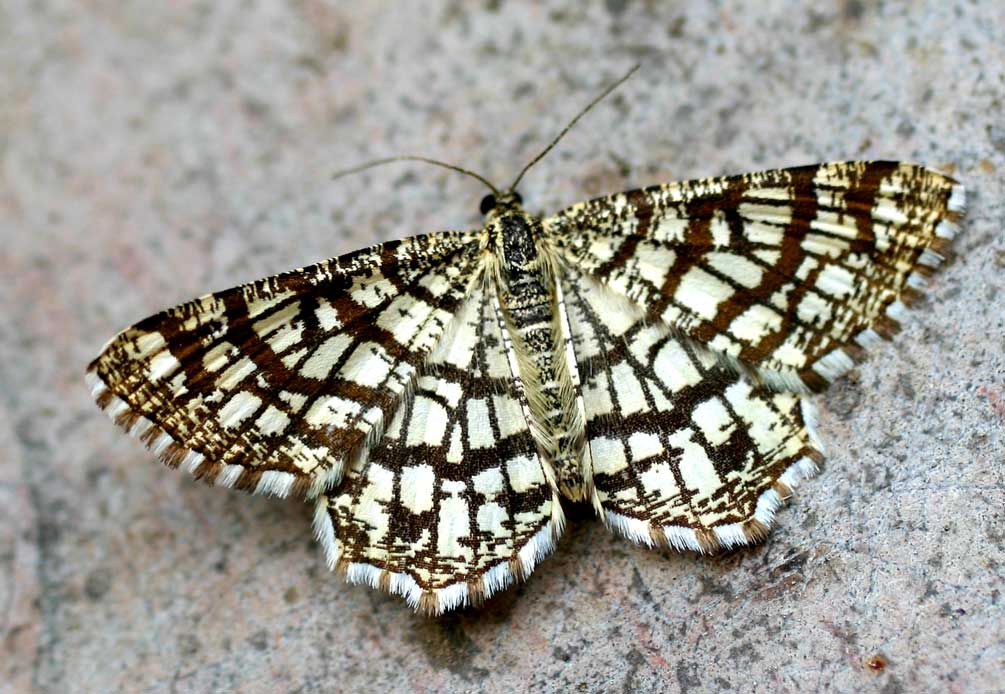
Spread wings

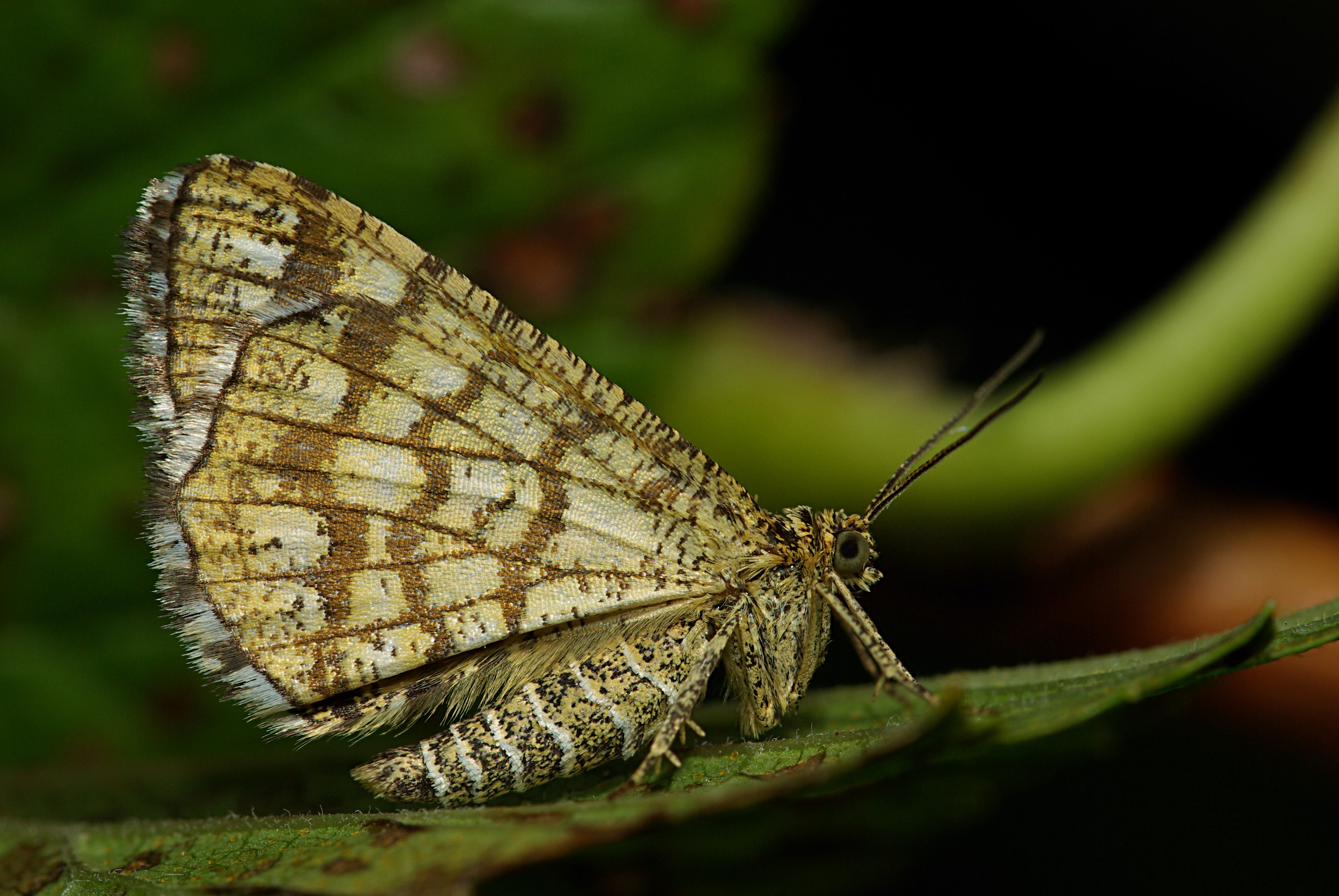
Underside, at night

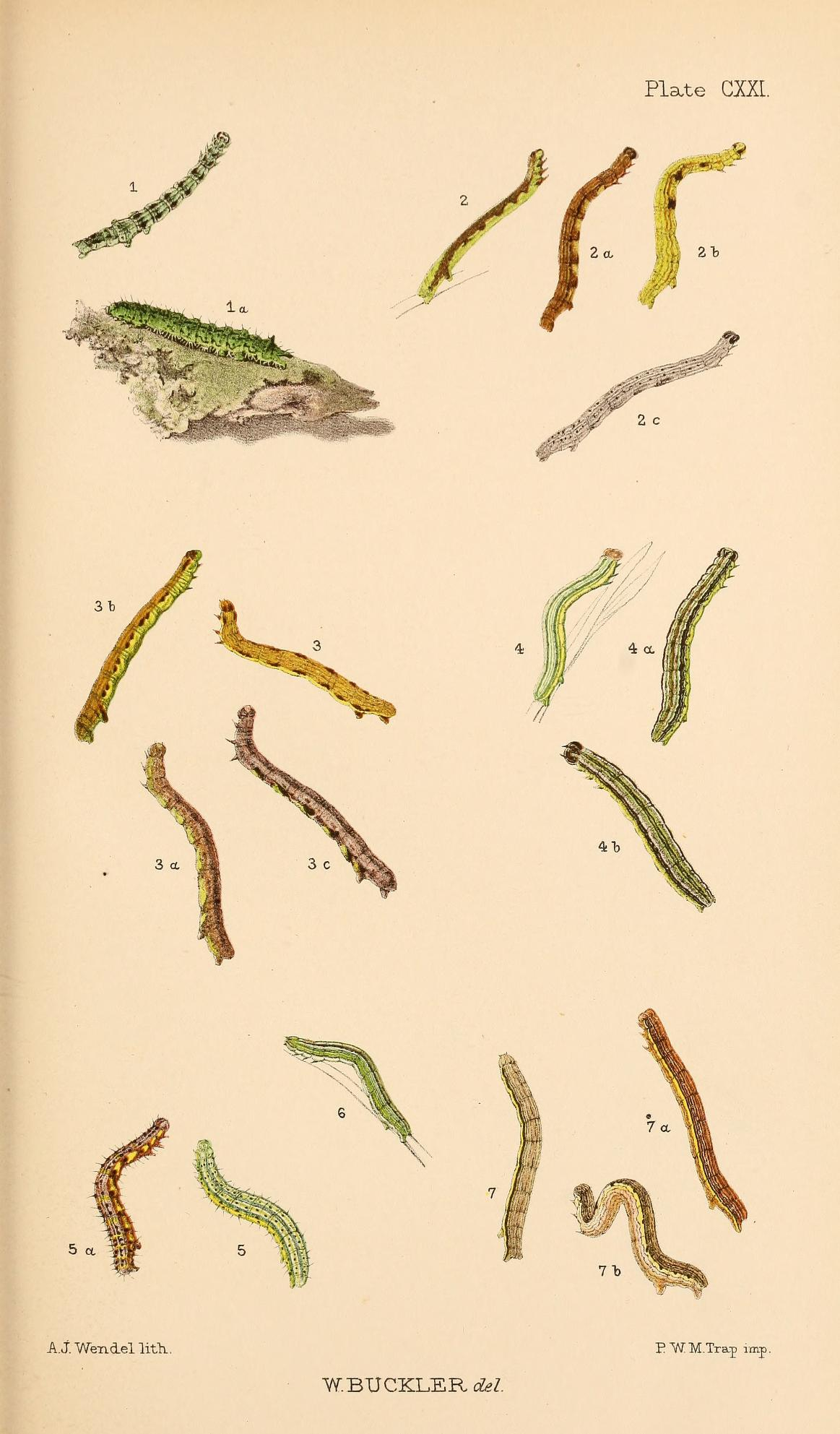
Fig. 6 larva after final moult

=== Larva ===
The final instar larva is pale green with white lines, including a strong lateral line and thin dorsal lines along the body. Abdominal segments A1 through A5 have a strong white line across the rear end of each segment that ends just above the lateral line.

== Ecology ==
Video clip of Chiasmia clathrata

In the British Isles there are one or two generations annually, with adults seen at any time from May to September. These moths are diurnal but they can also be observed at night where they are attracted to artificial light. Larvae feed on bedstraws (Galium mollugo, Galium verum) and various legumes such as clovers (Trifolium medium, Trifolium pratense), trefoils, lucerne (Medicago sativa) and meadow vetchling, primarily in June and July and from mid-August through September, though in Ireland and northern Britain larvae occur in July and August. The species overwinters as a pupa.

== Bibliography ==
- Chinery, M., 1986. Collins Guide to the Insects of Britain and Western Europe (Reprinted 1991)
- Õunap, E., Javoiš, J., Viidalepp, J. & Tammaru, T., 2011. Phylogenetic relationships of selected European Ennominae (Lepidoptera: Geometridae). European Journal of Entomology 108: 267–273.
- Porter, J., 1997. The Colour Identification Guide to Caterpillars of the British Isles. Viking Press, Harmondsworth, Middlesex. xii + 275 pp. ISBN 0-670-87509-0
- Skinner, B., 1984. Colour Identification Guide to Moths of the British Isles
- Scoble, M.J. & M. Krüger, 2002. A review of the genera of Macariini with a revised classification of the tribe (Geometridae: Ennominae). Zoological Journal of the Linnean Society 134 (3): 257–315. doi:10.1046/j.1096-3642.2002.00008.x
