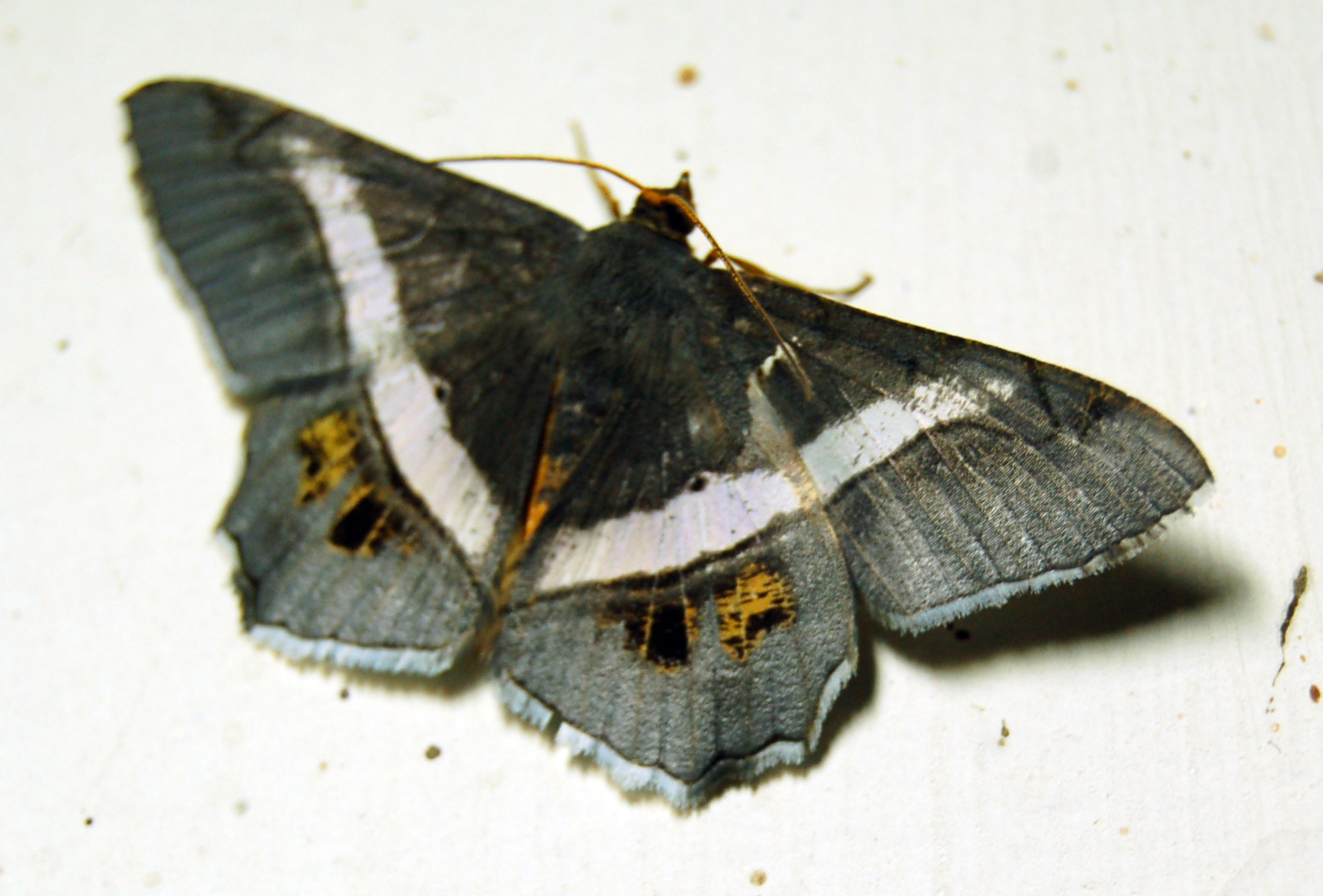

Scientific classification
- Kingdom: Animalia
- Phylum: Arthropoda
- Class: Insecta
- Order: Lepidoptera
- Family: Geometridae
- Genus: Chiasmia
- Species: C. nora

Binomial name
- Chiasmia nora (Walker, 1861)

Synonyms
- Macaria nora Walker, 1861; Godonela nora; Semiothisa nora

= Chiasmia nora =

Species of moth

Chiasmia nora is a moth in the family Geometridae, described by Francis Walker in 1861. It is found in northern India, Sri Lanka, south-eastern Asia and probably throughout Sundaland.

== Description ==
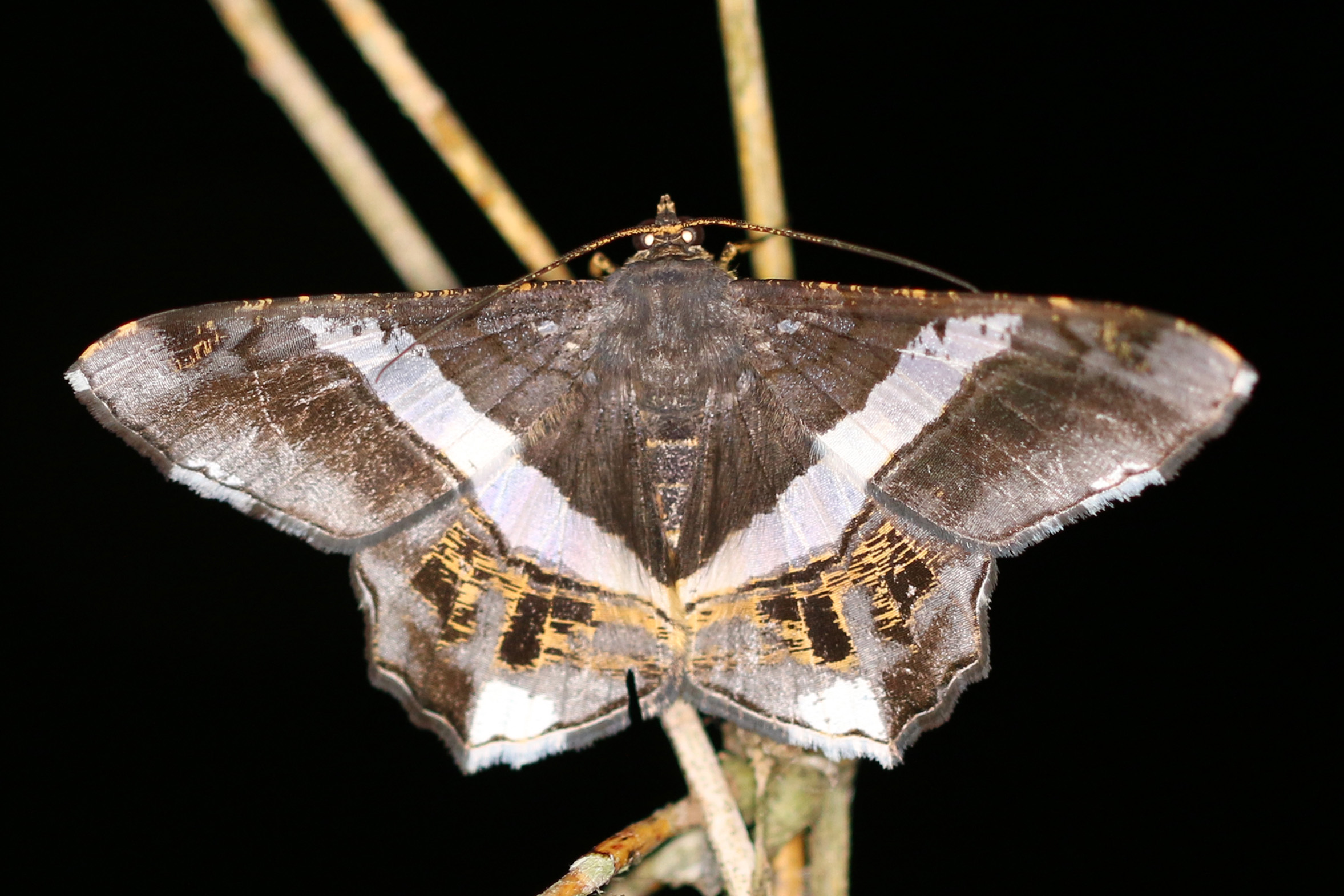

Its wingspan is about 42 mm. Forewings with outer margin slightly angled at vein 4. Male with dilated hind tibia. Very similar to Semiothisa eleonora, differs from black suffusion especially beyond the medial band of both wings. Forewings with a black speck at the end of the cell. Hindwings with black patches beyond the band more numerous. A white patch found on the outer area below vein 4.

Larva greenish, with light, dull yellow longitudinal bands. Larvae have been reared on Acacia species. Males are known to feed from mammalian body fluids. It was observed to drink the droplets exuded from the anus of a mosquito while it was sucking blood from a water buffalo.
