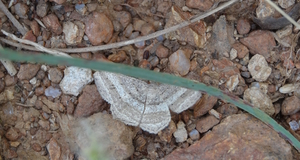

Scientific classification
- Kingdom: Animalia
- Phylum: Arthropoda
- Class: Insecta
- Order: Lepidoptera
- Family: Geometridae
- Genus: Chiasmia
- Species: C. fidoniata

Binomial name
- Chiasmia fidoniata (Guenee, 1858)

Synonyms
- Macaria fidoniata Guenee, 1858; Tephrina arenaria Swinhoe, 1885; Macaria cacavena Walker, 1861; Tephrinopsis lineata Warren, 1899; Chiasmia fidoneata

= Chiasmia fidoniata =

Species of moth

Chiasmia fidoniata is a moth of the family Geometridae. It is found in Pakistan, India, Thailand and China (Hong Kong).

The wingspan is 28 mm for the wet season form and 25 mm for the dry season form.
