= Semiothisa frugaliata =

Scientific classification
- Kingdom: Animalia
- Phylum: Arthropoda
- Class: Insecta
- Order: Lepidoptera
- Family: Geometridae
- Genus: Semiothisa
- Species: S. frugaliata

Binomial name
- Semiothisa frugaliata Guenée, 1858

Species of moth

Semiothisa frugaliata is a moth of the family Geometridae first described by Achille Guenée in 1858. It is found in India and Sri Lanka.
