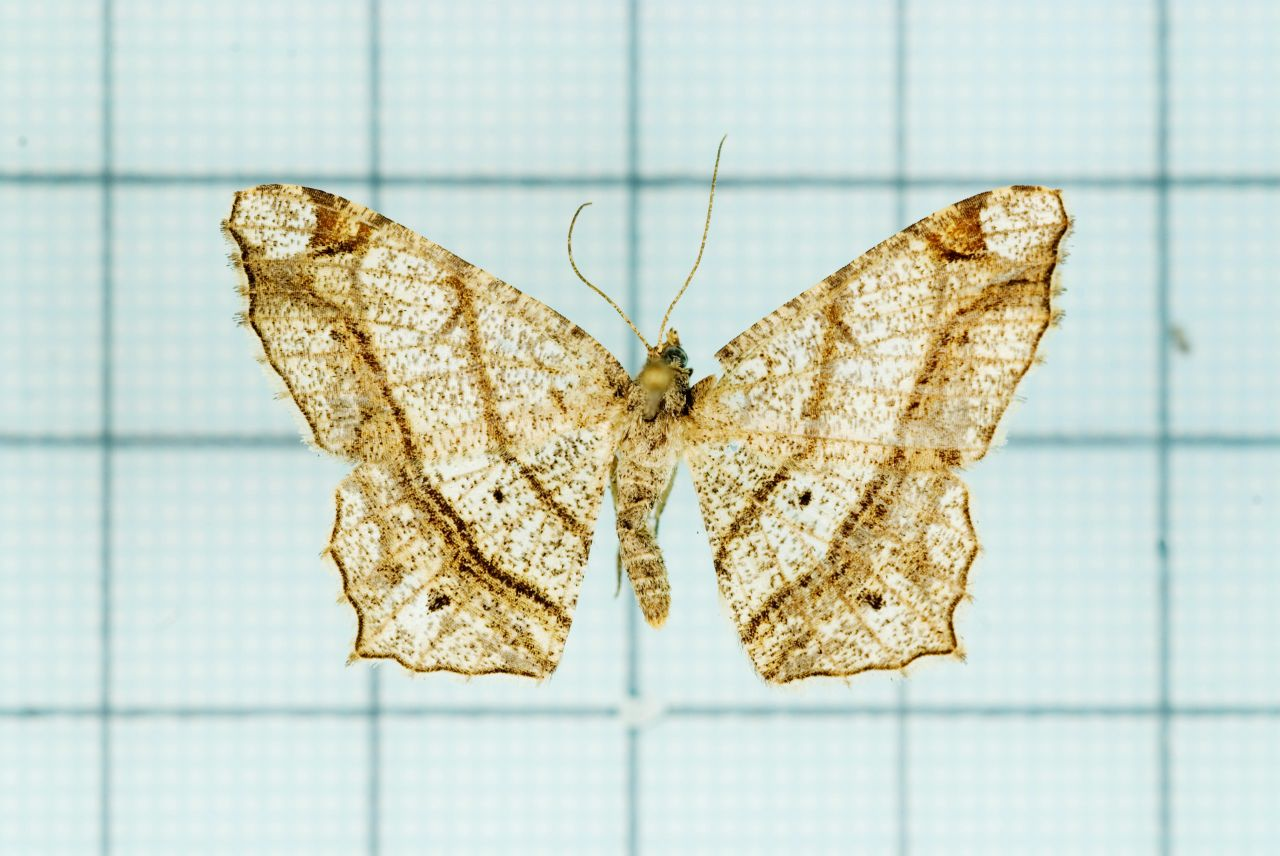

Scientific classification
- Kingdom: Animalia
- Phylum: Arthropoda
- Class: Insecta
- Order: Lepidoptera
- Family: Geometridae
- Genus: Chiasmia
- Species: C. defixaria

Binomial name
- Chiasmia defixaria (Walker, 1861)

Synonyms
- Macaria defixaria Walker, 1861; Macaria zachera Butler, 1878; Chiasmia zachera

= Chiasmia defixaria =

Species of moth

Chiasmia defixaria is a moth of the family Geometridae. It is found in Asia, including Japan, Korea and Taiwan.

The wingspan is 25–27 mm.
