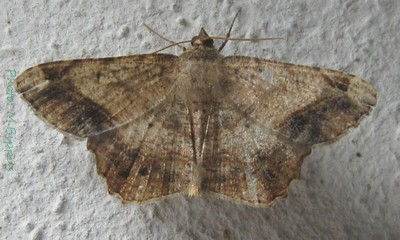
- Semiothisa troni

Scientific classification
- Kingdom: Animalia
- Phylum: Arthropoda
- Clade: Pancrustacea
- Class: Insecta
- Order: Lepidoptera
- Family: Geometridae
- Subfamily: Ennominae
- Tribe: Macariini
- Genus: Semiothisa; Hübner, 1818

Type species
- Semiothisa gambaria Hübner, 1818

Synonyms
- Acadra Herrich-Schäffer, 1856; Allochrosis Strand, 1912; Azata Walker, 1860; Chiasmiodes Warren, 1896; Digrammia Gumppenberg, 1887; Eutropa Hübner, 1827-33; Evarzia Walker, 1860; Godonela Boisduval, 1840; Gubaria Moore, 1887; Iulocera Warren, 1905; Macaria Curtis, 1826; Neomacaria Wehrli, 1937; Philobia Duponchel, 1829; Sciagraphia Hulst, 1896; Thyridesia Wehrli, 1940; Trigrammia Herrich-Schäffer, 1856

= Semiothisa =

Genus of moths

Semiothisa is a genus of moths in the family Geometridae. It was erected by Jacob Hübner in 1818.

== Species ==
Some species of this genus are:

- Semiothisa albivia (Prout, 1915)
- Semiothisa arenosa (Butler, 1875)
- Semiothisa assimilis Warren, 1899
- Semiothisa butaria Swinhoe, 1904
- Semiothisa cacularia (Oberthür, 1891)
- Semiothisa cararia Swinhoe, 1904
- Semiothisa cinerearia Bremer & Grey, 1853
- Semiothisa clathrata Linnaeus
- Semiothisa coninuaria (Eversmann, 1852)
- Semiothisa crassata (Warren, 1897)
- Semiothisa decorata Warren, 1906
- Semiothisa dentilineata (Warren, 1914)
- Semiothisa destitutaria (Walker, 1861)
- Semiothisa deviaria (Walker, 1863)
- Semiothisa eleonora (Villers, 1789)
- Semiothisa erevanica Wardikjan, 1985
- Semiothisa frugaliata Guenée, 1858
- Semiothisa fuscataria Möschler, 1887
- Semiothisa fuscorufa (Prout, 1915)
- Semiothisa gambaria Hübner 1818
- Semiothisa hebetata (Hulst, 1881)
- Semiothisa idriasaria (Walker, 1860)
- Semiothisa infixaria (Walker, 1863)
- Semiothisa johnstoni (Butler, 1894)
- Semiothisa kilimanjarensis (Holland, 1892)
- Semiothisa kuschea Guedet, 1939
- Semiothisa latiscriptata (Walker, 1863)
- Semiothisa lautusaria (Swinhoe, 1902)
- Semiothisa maculosata Warren, 1896
- Semiothisa majestica Warren, 1901
- Semiothisa natalensis Warren, 1904
- Semiothisa neptaria (Guenee)
- Semiothisa normata (Walker, 1861)
- Semiothisa notata Linnaeus, 1758
- Semiothisa nubilata (Warren, 1897)
- Semiothisa olindaria (Swinhoe, 1904)
- Semiothisa orthostates (Prout, 1915)
- Semiothisa ostentosaria Möschler, 1887
- Semiothisa percnoptera (Prout, 1915)
- Semiothisa perfusaria Walker, 1866
- Semiothisa peyrierasi Viette, 1975
- Semiothisa procidata (Guenée, 1857)
- Semiothisa promiscuata Ferguson, 1974
- Semiothisa quadraria (Moore, 1887)
- Semiothisa rhabdophora (Holland, 1892)
- Semiothisa saburraria (Eversmann, 1851)
- Semiothisa semialbida (Prout, 1915
- Semiothisa shanghaisaria (Walker, 1862)
- Semiothisa subcretata Warren, 1905
- Semiothisa submarmorata (Walker)
- Semiothisa tancrearia Staudinger, 1892
- Semiothisa testaceata (Walker, 1863)
- Semiothisa troni Guillermet, 2011
- Semiothisa ulsterata Pearsall
- Semiothisa umbrata (Warren, 1897)
- Semiothisa umbratilis (Butler, 1875)
- Semiothisa uvidaria Swinhoe, 1904
- Semiothisa verecundaria (Leech, 1897)
- Semiothisa warreni (Prout, 1915)

== Distribution ==
China.
