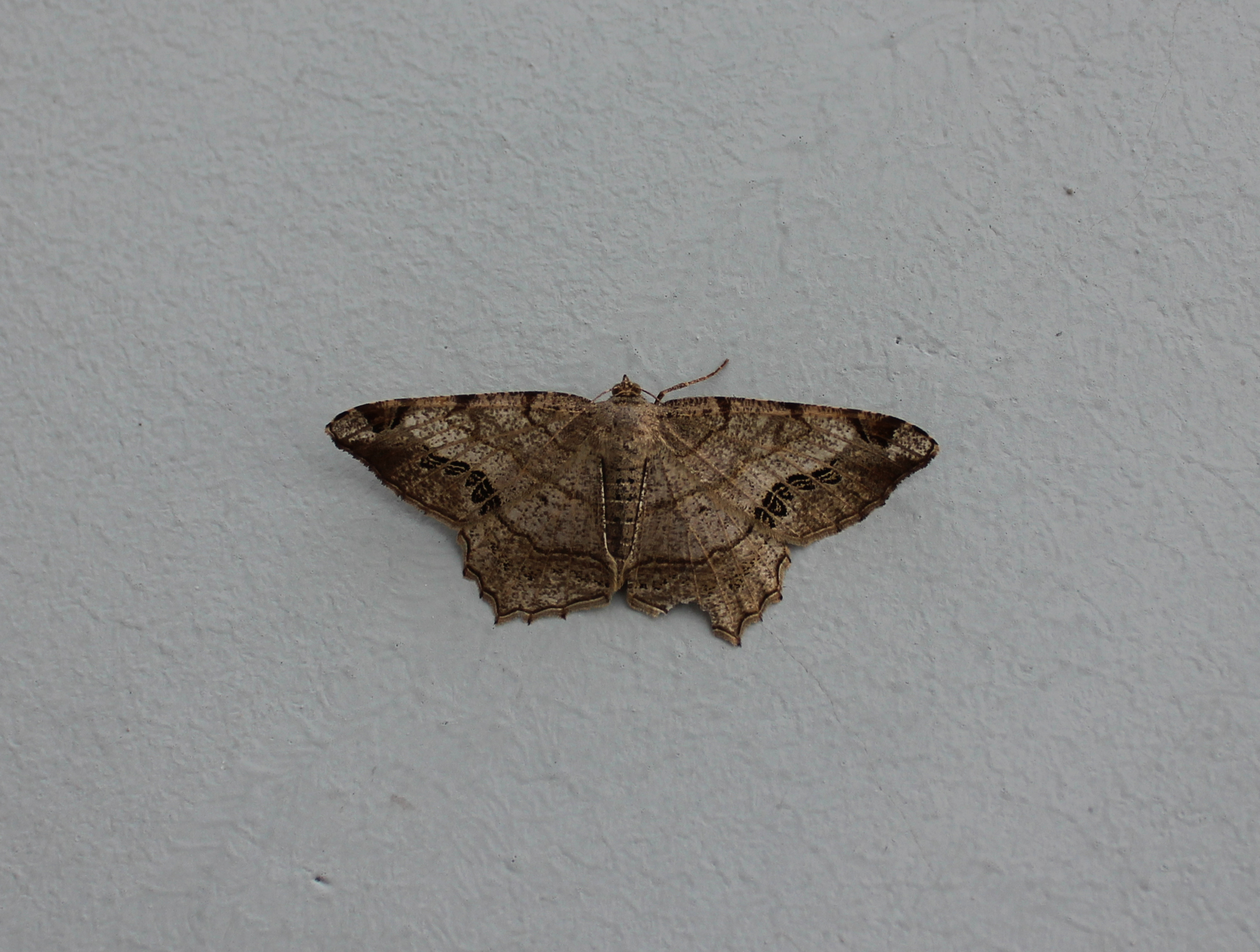

Scientific classification
- Kingdom: Animalia
- Phylum: Arthropoda
- Clade: Pancrustacea
- Class: Insecta
- Order: Lepidoptera
- Family: Geometridae
- Genus: Semiothisa
- Species: S. cinerearia

Binomial name
- Semiothisa cinerearia (Bremer & Grey，1853)

Synonyms
- Philobia cinerearia Bremer & Grey, 1853; Macaria cinerearia; Chiasmia cinerearia; Macaria elongaria Leech, 1897; Semiothisa eurytaenia Wehrli, 1932

= Semiothisa cinerearia =

Species of moth

Semiothisa cinerearia is a moth of the family Geometridae first described by Otto Vasilievich Bremer and Vasilii Fomich Grey in 1853. It is found in China and its major host plant is Styphnolobium japonicum.

== Subspecies ==
- Semiothisa cinerearia cinerearia
- Semiothisa cinerearia eurytaenia (Wehrli 1932)
