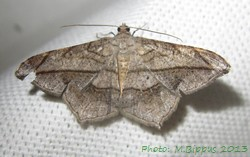

Scientific classification
- Kingdom: Animalia
- Phylum: Arthropoda
- Clade: Pancrustacea
- Class: Insecta
- Order: Lepidoptera
- Family: Geometridae
- Genus: Chiasmia
- Species: C. simplicilinea

Binomial name
- Chiasmia simplicilinea (Warren, 1905)

Synonyms
- Acadra simplicilinea Warren, 1905; Macaria trigonata Pagenstecher, 1907; Semiothisa pagenstecheri Herbulot, 1978

= Chiasmia simplicilinea =

Species of moth

Chiasmia simplicilinea is a moth in the family Geometridae. It is found in eastern and southern Africa from Ethiopia to South Africa and in Ivory Coast & Madagascar.

Known foodplants of the larvae of this species are Mimosoideae, Acacia dealbata and Acacia mearnsii.

== Subspecies ==
- Chiasmia simplicilinea simplicilinea (Warren, 1905)
- Chiasmia simplicilinea pagenstecheri (Herbulot, 1978)
