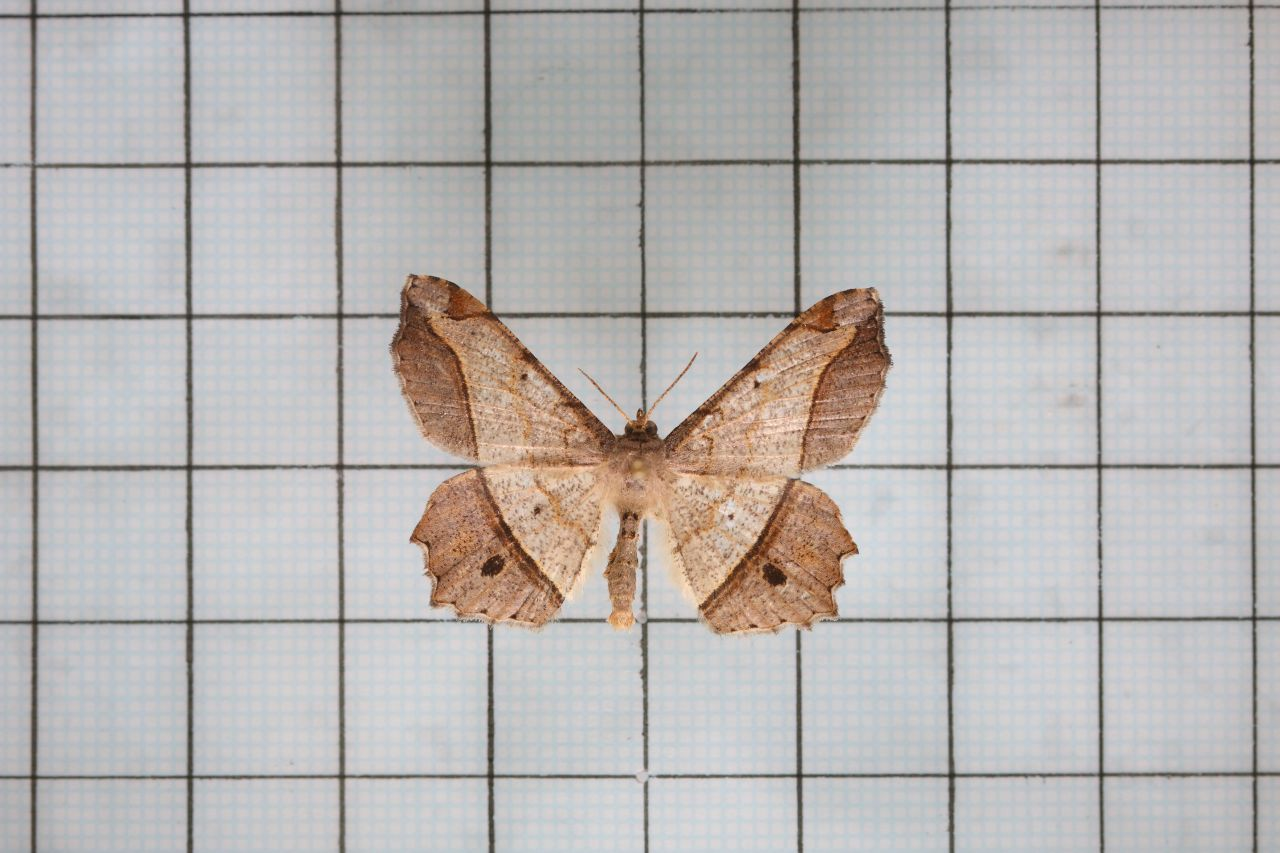
- Chiasmia monticolaria notia

Scientific classification
- Domain: Eukaryota
- Kingdom: Animalia
- Phylum: Arthropoda
- Class: Insecta
- Order: Lepidoptera
- Family: Geometridae
- Genus: Chiasmia
- Species: C. monticolaria

Binomial name
- Chiasmia monticolaria (Leech, 1897)

Synonyms
- Semiothisa monticolaria Leech, 1897

= Chiasmia monticolaria =

Species of moth

Chiasmia monticolaria is a moth of the family Geometridae first described by John Henry Leech in 1897. It is found in Asia, including Taiwan.

== Subspecies ==
- Chiasmia monticolaria monticolaria
- Chiasmia monticolaria notia Wehrli, 1940 (Taiwan)
