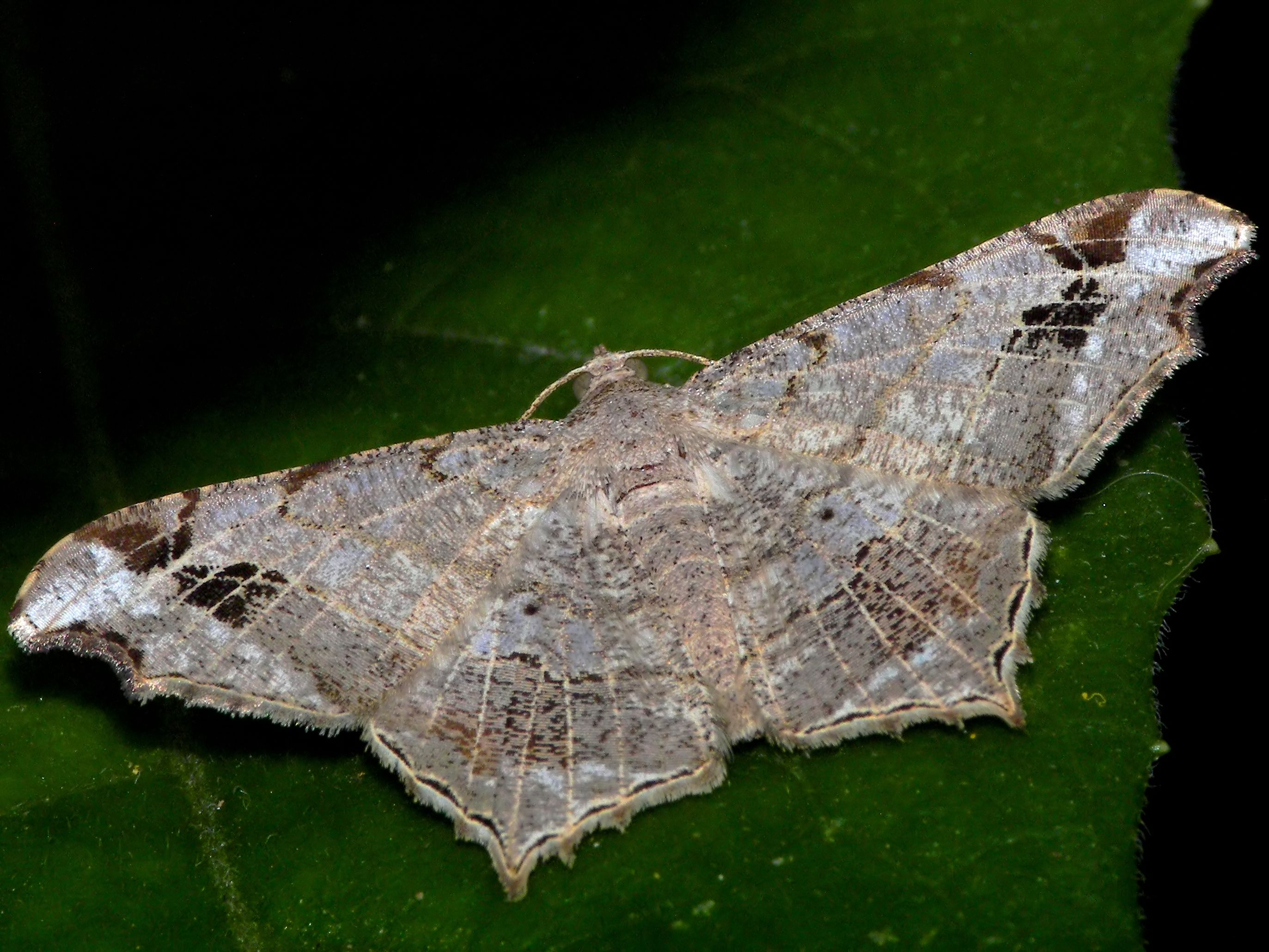

Scientific classification
- Kingdom: Animalia
- Phylum: Arthropoda
- Class: Insecta
- Order: Lepidoptera
- Family: Geometridae
- Genus: Chiasmia
- Species: C. emersaria

Binomial name
- Chiasmia emersaria (Walker, 1861)

Synonyms
- Macaria emersaria Walker, 1861; Godonela emersaria; Semiothisa emersaria

= Chiasmia emersaria =

Species of moth

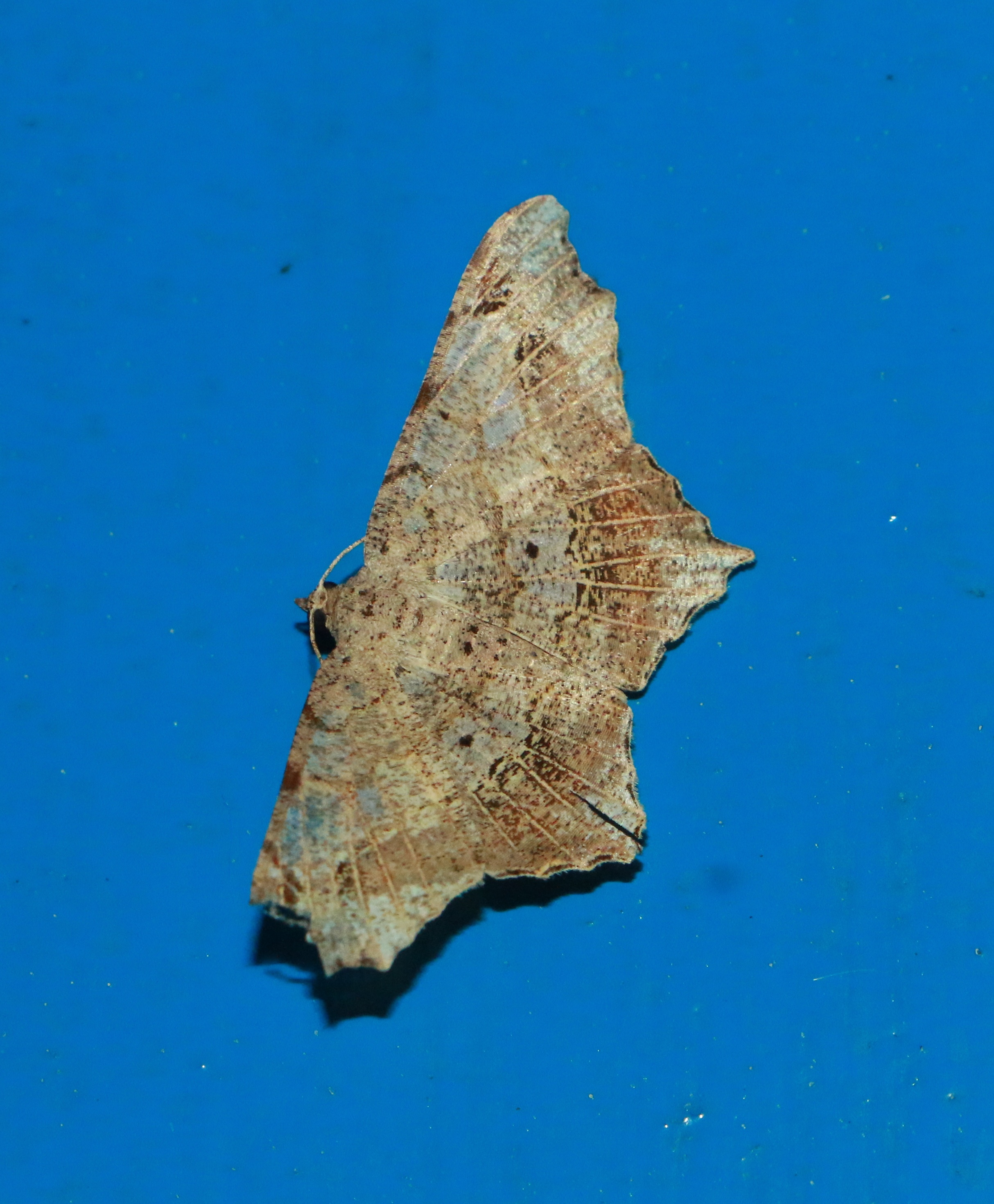
Chiasmia emersaria

Chiasmia emersaria is a moth of the family Geometridae. The species was first described by Francis Walker in 1861. It is found in India, Nepal, northern Thailand, China, Sri Lanka, Japan and the Ryukyu Islands.

== Description ==
The wingspan is about 32 mm in the male and 40 mm in the female. Outer margin of forewing prominently angled at vein 4. Hind tibia of male dilated. Body grey irrorated (sprinkled) with pale and dark brown. Abdomen with dark spots on dorsum. Forewings with subbasal dark speck. Indistinct oblique antemedial, medial, and postmedial lines angled below costa and arising from rufous patches or short bands on costa. There is a dark speck found at the end of the cell. The postmedial line with a costal rufous patch beyond it and disintegrated dark patch at vein 4. Outer area slightly darker and margin rufous below apex. Hindwing with indistinct antemedial line. Dark spot found at the end of the cell. There is a dark waved postmedial line, with rufous and grey suffusion beyond it. A marginal dark line is present. Both wings with the veins of pale outer area. Ventral side with broad rufous postmedial band with crenulate outer edge.
