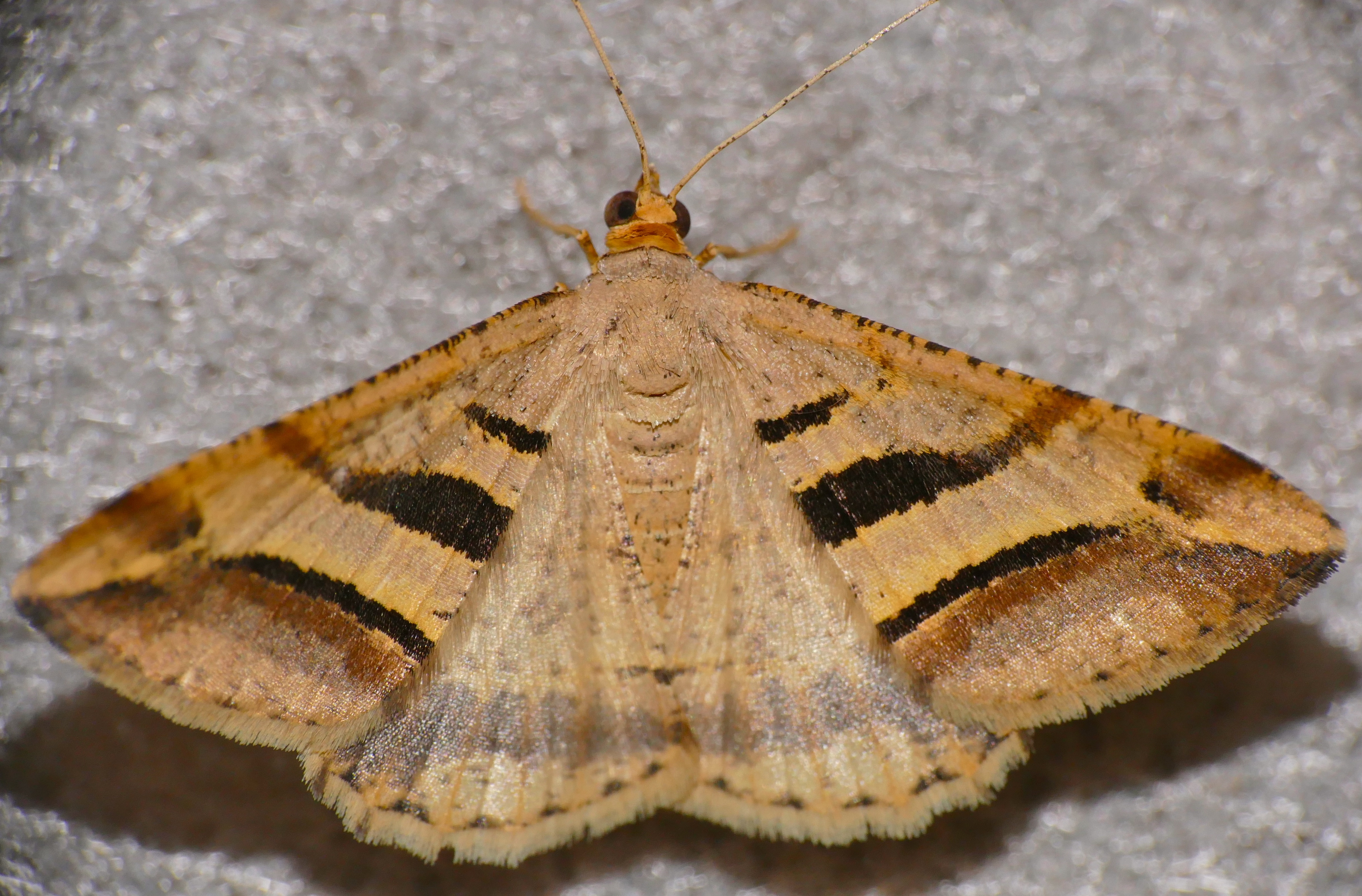

Scientific classification
- Kingdom: Animalia
- Phylum: Arthropoda
- Clade: Pancrustacea
- Class: Insecta
- Order: Lepidoptera
- Family: Geometridae
- Genus: Chiasmia
- Species: C. subcurvaria

Binomial name
- Chiasmia subcurvaria (Mabille, 1897)

Synonyms
- Tephrina subcurvaria; Discalma subcurvaria; Semiothisa subcurvaria

= Chiasmia subcurvaria =

Species of moth

Chiasmia subcurvaria, the triple striped peacock, is a species of geometer moth described by Paul Mabille in 1897. The larval foodplants of Chiasmia subcurvaria are some of the Vachellia species.

== Distribution ==
The distribution of Chiasmia subcurvaria is mostly Southern Africa.
