= Semiothisa quadraria =

Scientific classification
- Kingdom: Animalia
- Phylum: Arthropoda
- Class: Insecta
- Order: Lepidoptera
- Family: Geometridae
- Genus: Semiothisa
- Species: S. quadraria

Binomial name
- Semiothisa quadraria Moore, 1887

Synonyms
- Chiasmia quadraria (Moore, [1887])

Species of moth

Semiothisa quadraria is a moth of the family Geometridae first described by Frederic Moore in 1887. It is found in Sri Lanka.
