= Chiasmia subvaria =

Scientific classification
- Domain: Eukaryota
- Kingdom: Animalia
- Phylum: Arthropoda
- Class: Insecta
- Order: Lepidoptera
- Family: Geometridae
- Genus: Chiasmia
- Species: C. subvaria

Binomial name
- Chiasmia subvaria (Bastelberger, 1907)

Synonyms
- Gonodela subvaria Bastelberger, 1907; Gonodela cretiguttata Bastelberger, 1909

Species of insect

Chiasmia subvaria is a moth of the family Geometridae first described by Max Bastelberger in 1907. It is found in subtropical Africa and is known from Angola, Cameroon, Ivory Coast, Kenya, Rwanda, Tanzania, Uganda and Zimbabwe.

The basic colour of its wings is yellow brown, crossed by three black-brown transversal lines. The wingspan is 33 mm.
