= Chiasmia sufflata =

Scientific classification
- Kingdom: Animalia
- Phylum: Arthropoda
- Class: Insecta
- Order: Lepidoptera
- Family: Geometridae
- Genus: Chiasmia
- Species: C. sufflata

Binomial name
- Chiasmia sufflata (Guenée, 1858)

Synonyms
- Semiothisa sufflata Guenée, 1858

Species of moth

Chiasmia sufflata is a moth of the family Geometridae first described by Achille Guenée in 1858. It is found in Sri Lanka.
