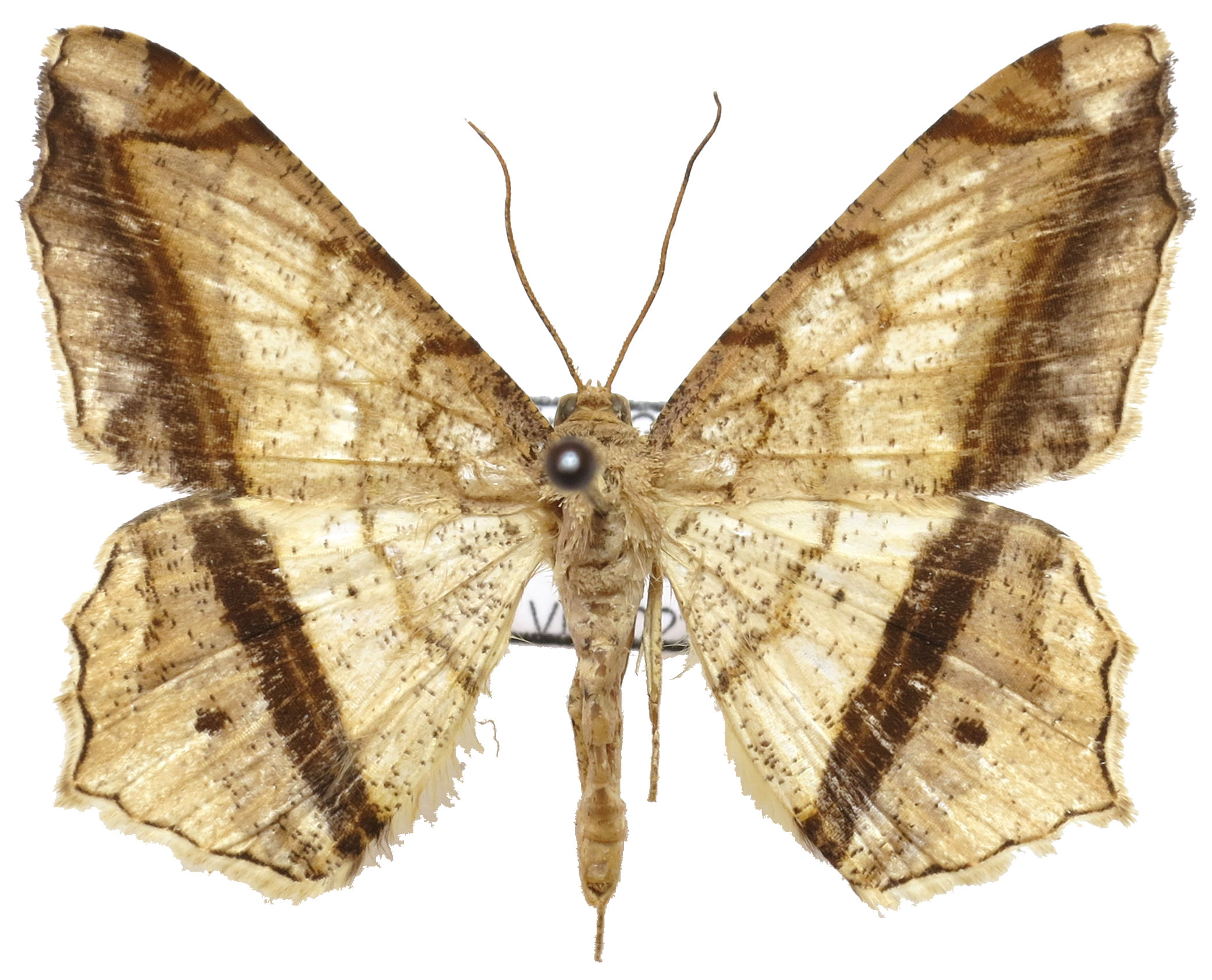
- S. ozararia from Kangding, Sichuan, China

Scientific classification
- Kingdom: Animalia
- Phylum: Arthropoda
- Class: Insecta
- Order: Lepidoptera
- Family: Geometridae
- Genus: Semiothisa
- Species: S. ozararia

Binomial name
- Semiothisa ozararia (Walker, 1860)

Synonyms
- Evarzia ozararia Walker, 1860; Macaria perspicuaria Moore, 1867; Evarzia indica Butler, 1880; Chiasmia ozararia (Walker, 1860)

= Semiothisa ozararia =

Species of moth

Semiothisa ozararia (sometimes as Godonela ozararia), is a moth of the family Geometridae first described by Francis Walker in 1860. It is found in the Indian subregion, Sri Lanka, Taiwan, Borneo, Sumatra and Java.

It is a pale brownish to creamy coloured moth. Postmedial line of forewing is found very close proximity to the margin. The caterpillar has a slender whitish body. Head, first thoracic segment and anal segment and clasper are all yellowish brown. Body consists regular pattern of black spots and diamond-shaped spots. Its host plant is Acacia mangium.
