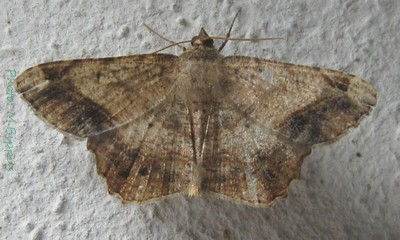

Scientific classification
- Domain: Eukaryota
- Kingdom: Animalia
- Phylum: Arthropoda
- Class: Insecta
- Order: Lepidoptera
- Family: Geometridae
- Genus: Semiothisa
- Species: S. troni

Binomial name
- Semiothisa troni Guillermet, 2011

= Semiothisa troni =

Species of moth

Semiothisa troni is a moth of the family Geometridae. It was described by Christian Guillermet in 2011 and is endemic to Réunion.

The wingspan is 30–35 mm.

== See also ==
- List of moths of Réunion
