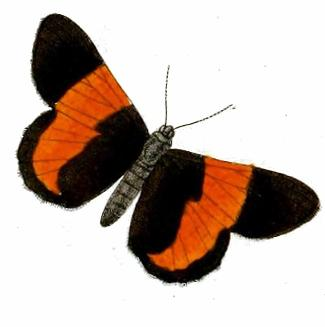

Scientific classification
- Domain: Eukaryota
- Kingdom: Animalia
- Phylum: Arthropoda
- Class: Insecta
- Order: Lepidoptera
- Family: Geometridae
- Genus: Chiasmia
- Species: C. goldiei

Binomial name
- Chiasmia goldiei (Druce, 1882)

Synonyms
- Bociraza goldiei Druce, 1882; Godonela goldiei; Automolodes imparifascia Prout, 1931

= Chiasmia goldiei =

Species of moth

Chiasmia goldiei is a moth in the family Geometridae first described by Druce in 1882. It is found in Australia and Papua New Guinea.

The forewings are black, crossed in the middle by a wide orange band, the apex tipped with white. The hindwings are black, crossed from the costal margin to near the anal angle by a yellow band tapering almost to a point. The underside is the same as the upperside. The head, thorax and abdomen are black.

== Subspecies ==
- Chiasmia goldiei goldiei
- Chiasmia goldiei imperifascia (Prout, 1931)
