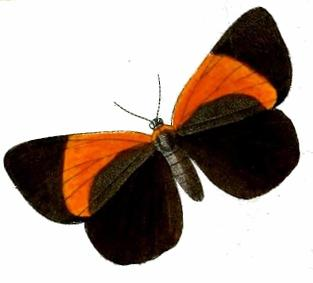

Scientific classification
- Domain: Eukaryota
- Kingdom: Animalia
- Phylum: Arthropoda
- Class: Insecta
- Order: Lepidoptera
- Family: Geometridae
- Genus: Chiasmia
- Species: C. separata

Binomial name
- Chiasmia separata (H. Druce, 1882)

Synonyms
- Bociraza separata H. Druce, 1882; Automolodes separata; Semiothisa conjugata Herbulot, 1966

= Chiasmia separata =

Species of moth

Chiasmia separata is a moth in the family Geometridae first described by Herbert Druce in 1882. It is found on Saint Helena and has also been recorded from South Africa, Angola, Cameroon, Ivory Coast, Kenya, Madagascar, Mozambique, Nigeria, Rwanda, Tanzania and Uganda.

The forewings have a length of 13–17 mm, they are black, although the costal half is chrome yellow, extending to the anal angle. The hindwings are black. The underside is the same as the upperside. The head and front of the thorax are yellow and the back of the thorax and abdomen are black.

== Subspecies ==
- Chiasmia separata separata (Saint Helena, Africa)
- Chiasmia separata conjugata (Herbulot, 1966) (Madagascar)
