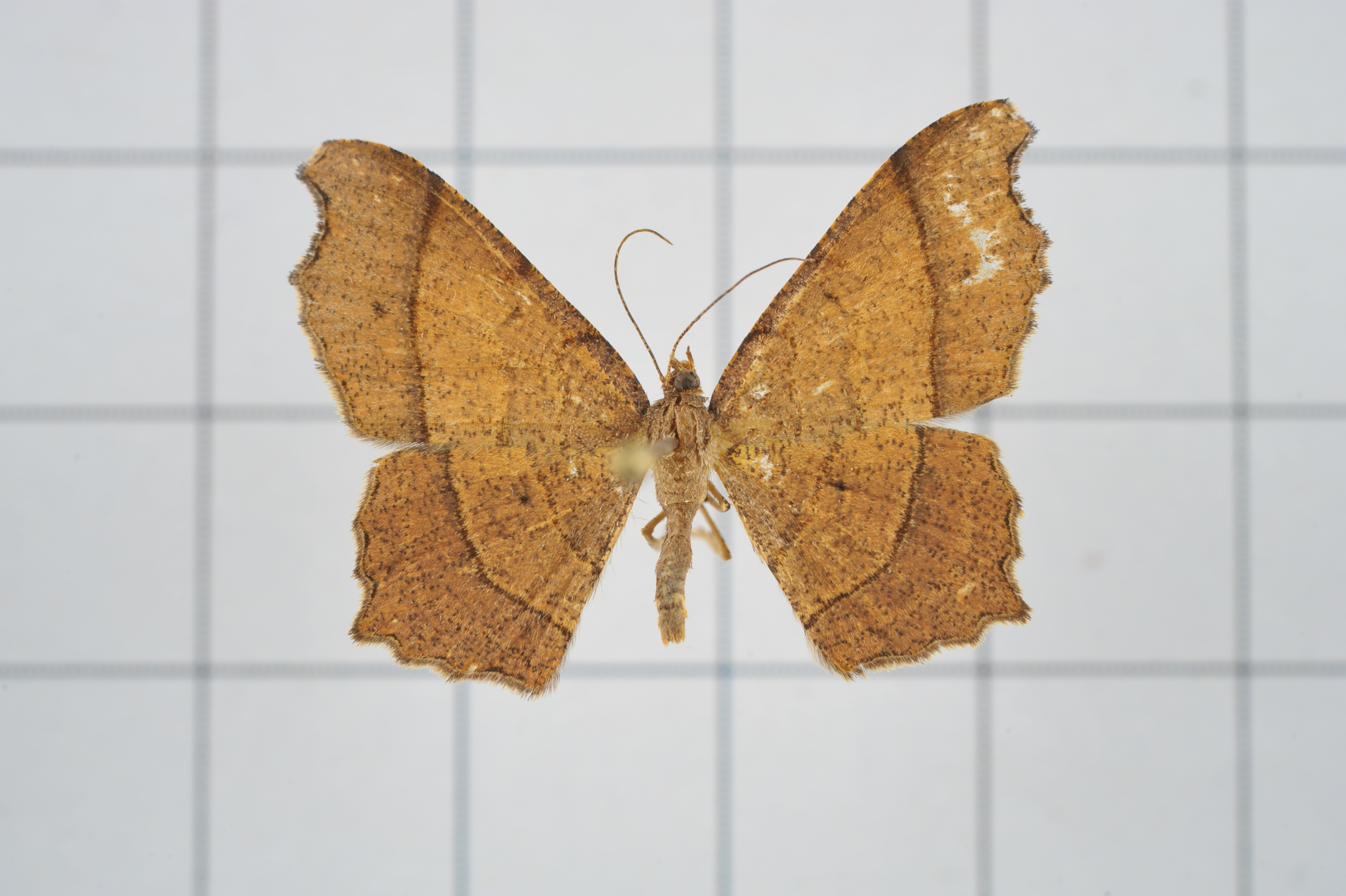

Scientific classification
- Kingdom: Animalia
- Phylum: Arthropoda
- Class: Insecta
- Order: Lepidoptera
- Family: Geometridae
- Genus: Semiothisa
- Species: S. perfusaria

Binomial name
- Semiothisa perfusaria (Walker, 1866)

Synonyms
- Chiasmia perfusaria (Walker, 1866)

= Semiothisa perfusaria =

Species of moth

Semiothisa perfusaria, sometimes placed in the genus Godonela, is a moth of the family Geometridae. It is found in India, Malaysia, and Taiwan.
