= Chiasmia streniata =

Scientific classification
- Kingdom: Animalia
- Phylum: Arthropoda
- Class: Insecta
- Order: Lepidoptera
- Family: Geometridae
- Genus: Chiasmia
- Species: C. streniata

Binomial name
- Chiasmia streniata (Guenée, 1858)

Synonyms
- Macaria albogrisearia Mabille, 1900; Macaria amandata Walker, 1861; Macaria arata Saalmüller, 1891; Gonodela flavipicta Bastelberger, 1907; Gonodela lunivallata Warren, 1905; Macaria streniata Guenée, 1858

Species of moth

Chiasmia streniata is a moth of the family Geometridae first described by Achille Guenée in 1858. It is found in most countries of subtropical Africa, from Sénégal to Kenya and Sudan to South Africa.

The wingspan is 28 mm.

== Subspecies ==
- Chiasmia streniata streniata (Guenée, 1858) - continental Africa
- Chiasmia streniata arata (Saalmüller, 1891) - from Madagascar
