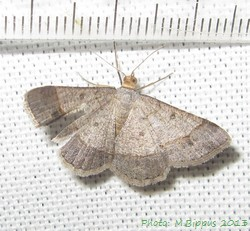

Scientific classification
- Kingdom: Animalia
- Phylum: Arthropoda
- Class: Insecta
- Order: Lepidoptera
- Family: Geometridae
- Genus: Chiasmia
- Species: C. normata

Binomial name
- Chiasmia normata (Walker, 1861)

Synonyms
- Tephrina normata Walker, 1861; Tephrina minoa Strand, 1915; Tephrina desiccata Walker, 1866; Aspilates exfusaria Walker, 1863; Epione malefidaria Mabille, 1880; Tephrinopsis congener Warren, 1897; Discalma normata Walker, 1861; Semiothisa normata Walker, 1861

= Chiasmia normata =

Species of moth

Chiasmia normata is a moth in the family Geometridae first described by Francis Walker in 1861. It is found throughout of subtropical Africa and Asia, from India, Japan, Taiwan, Sri Lanka. to the Philippines and in Australia.

Its host plant is Elaeagnus umbellata.
