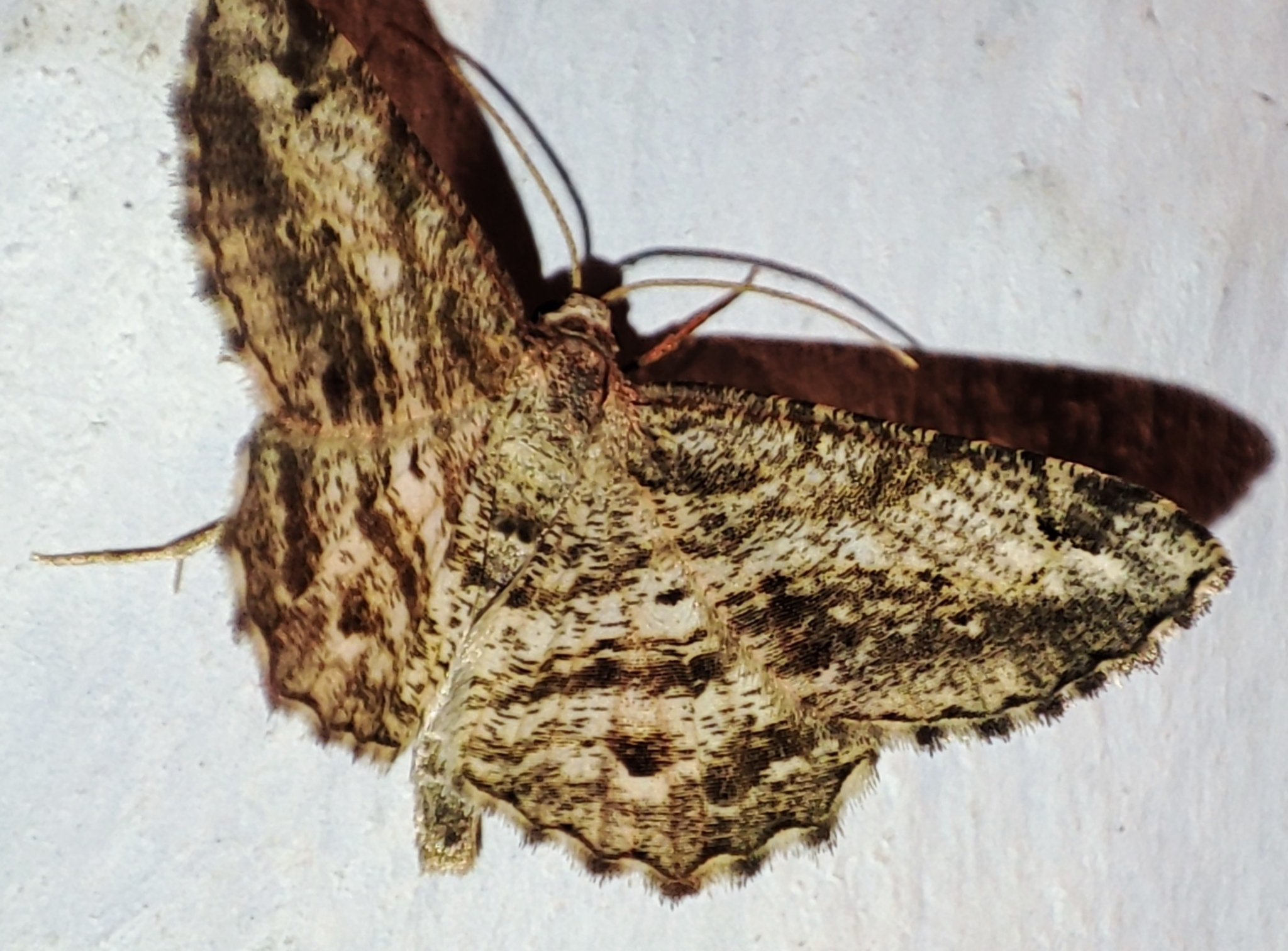

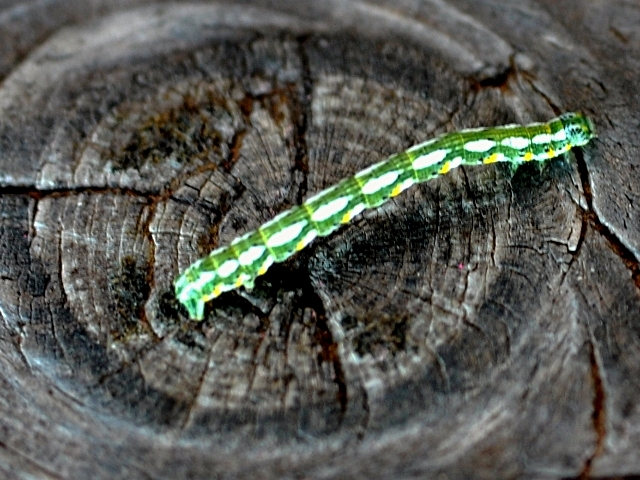
- Adult (top), Larva (bottom)

Scientific classification
- Kingdom: Animalia
- Phylum: Arthropoda
- Clade: Pancrustacea
- Class: Insecta
- Order: Lepidoptera
- Family: Geometridae
- Genus: Godonela
- Species: G. aestimaria

Binomial name
- Godonela aestimaria (Hübner, 1809)

Synonyms
- Geometra aestimaria Hübner, 1809; Chiasmia aestimaria; Semiothisa aestimaria

= Godonela aestimaria =

Tamarisk peacock

Species of moth

Godonela aestimaria, the tamarisk peacock, is a moth of the family Geometridae. It is found in southern and south-eastern Europe and the Middle East.

The wingspan is 21–25 mm. There are two generations per year with adults on wing from April to May and again from August to October.

The larvae feed on various species of Tamarix.

== Subspecies ==
- Godonela aestimaria sareptanaria (Staudinger, 1871)
- Godonela aestimaria kuldshana (Wehrli, 1940)
