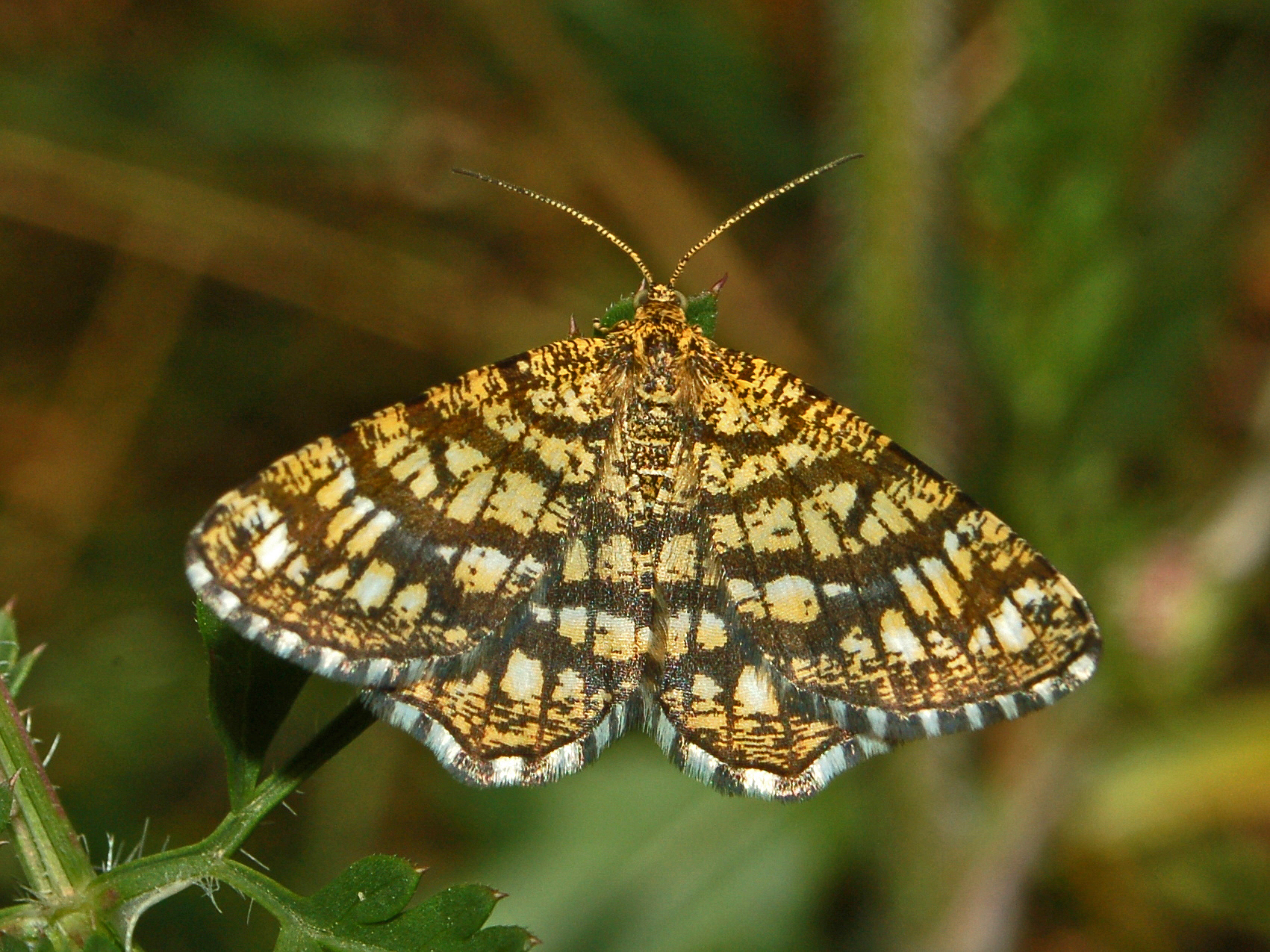
- Chiasmia clathrata

Scientific classification
- Kingdom: Animalia
- Phylum: Arthropoda
- Clade: Pancrustacea
- Class: Insecta
- Order: Lepidoptera
- Family: Geometridae
- Tribe: Macariini
- Genus: Chiasmia; Hübner, 1823

Synonyms
- Acadra Herrich-Schäffer, [1854]; Allochrosis Strand, 1912; Arte Stephens, 1829; Automolodes Warren, 1894; Discalma Meyrick, 1892; Evarzia Walker, 1860; Godonela Boisduval, 1840; Gubaria Moore, [1887]; Hercyna Stephens, 1829; Hyostomodes Warren, 1897; Iulocera Warren, 1905; Osteodes Guenée, [1858]; Pharmacis Hübner, [1823] 1816; Peridela Warren, 1897; Strenia Duponchel, [1829]; Tephrinopsis Warren, 1896; Thyridesia Wehrli, 1940; Xenoneura Warren, 1896

= Chiasmia =

Genus of moths

Chiasmia is a genus of moths in the family Geometridae. It was described by Jacob Hübner in 1823.

== Species ==
Species of this genus include:

- Chiasmia abnormata (Prout, 1917)
- Chiasmia abyssinica Krüger, 2001
- Chiasmia acutiapex Krüger, 2001
- Chiasmia adelpha Krüger, 2001
- Chiasmia aestimaria (Hübner, 1809) – tamarisk peacock
- Chiasmia affinis (Warren, 1902)
- Chiasmia albivia (Prout, 1915)
- Chiasmia alternata (Warren, 1899)
- Chiasmia amarata (Guenée, 1858)
- Chiasmia ammodes (Prout, 1922)
- Chiasmia androphoba Krüger, 2001
- Chiasmia angolae (Bethune-Baker, 1913)
- Chiasmia angolaria (Snellen, 1872)
- Chiasmia anguifera (Prout, 1934)
- Chiasmia arenosa (Butler, 1875)
- Chiasmia assimilis (Warren, 1899)
- Chiasmia ate (Prout, 1926)
- Chiasmia aureobrunnea Krüger, 2001
- Chiasmia austera (Prout, 1932)
- Chiasmia avitusarioides (Herbulot, 1956)
- Chiasmia baringensis Agassiz, 2009
- Chiasmia boarmioides Krüger, 2001
- Chiasmia bomfordi Krüger, 2001
- Chiasmia brongusaria (Walker, 1860)
- Chiasmia brunnescens Krüger, 2001
- Chiasmia butaria (Swinhoe, 1904)
- Chiasmia calvifrons (Prout, 1916)
- Chiasmia cararia (Swinhoe, 1904)
- Chiasmia castanea Krüger, 2001
- Chiasmia clathrata (Linnaeus, 1758) – latticed heath
- Chiasmia collaxata (Herbulot, 1987)
- Chiasmia confuscata (Warren, 1899)
- Chiasmia contaminata (Warren, 1902)
- Chiasmia conturbata (Warren, 1898)
- Chiasmia coronoleucas (Prout, 1915)
- Chiasmia costicommata (Prout, 1922)
- Chiasmia costiguttata (Warren, 1899)
- Chiasmia crassata (Warren, 1897)
- Chiasmia crassilembaria (Mabille, 1880)
- Chiasmia crumenata (D. S. Fletcher, 1963)
- Chiasmia curvifascia (Warren, 1897)
- Chiasmia curvilineata (Warren, 1899)
- Chiasmia danmariae Krüger, 2001
- Chiasmia deceptrix Krüger, 2001
- Chiasmia defixaria (Walker, 1861)
- Chiasmia deleta Krüger, 2001
- Chiasmia dentilineata (Warren, 1899)
- Chiasmia diarmodia (Prout, 1925)
- Chiasmia dodoma Krüger, 2001
- Chiasmia duplicilinea (Warren, 1897)
- Chiasmia evansi Krüger, 2001
- Chiasmia extrusilinea (Prout, 1925)
- Chiasmia featheri (Prout, 1922)
- Chiasmia feraliata (Guenée, 1858)
- Chiasmia fidoniata (Guenee, 1858)
- Chiasmia fitzgeraldi (Carcasson, 1964)
- Chiasmia flavicuneata (Herbulot, 1987)
- Chiasmia fontainei (D. S. Fletcher, 1963)
- Chiasmia frontosa (Wiltshire, 1986)
- Chiasmia fulvimargo (Warren, 1899)
- Chiasmia fulvisparsa (Warren, 1897)
- Chiasmia furcata (Warren, 1897)
- Chiasmia fuscataria (Möschler, 1887)
- Chiasmia geminilinea (Prout, 1932)
- Chiasmia getula (Wallengren, 1872)
- Chiasmia grandis Krüger, 2001
- Chiasmia grimmia (Wallengren, 1872)
- Chiasmia grisescens (Prout, 1916)
- Chiasmia gueyei Sircoulomb, 2009
- Chiasmia gyliura (Prout, 1932)
- Chiasmia herbuloti (Viette, 1973)
- Chiasmia hunyani Krüger, 2001
- Chiasmia hypactinia (Prout, 1916)
- Chiasmia imitatrix Krüger, 2001
- Chiasmia impar (Warren, 1897)
- Chiasmia improcera (Herbulot, 1987)
- Chiasmia inaequilinea (Warren, 1911)
- Chiasmia inconspicua (Warren, 1897)
- Chiasmia infabricata (Prout, 1934)
- Chiasmia inouei (Herbulot, 1987)
- Chiasmia inquinata Krüger, 2001
- Chiasmia insulicola Krüger, 2001
- Chiasmia interrupta (Warren, 1897)
- Chiasmia iringa Krüger, 2001
- Chiasmia johnstoni (Butler, 1893)
- Chiasmia kenyae Krüger, 2001
- Chiasmia kilifi Krüger, 2001
- Chiasmia kilimanjarensis (Holland, 1892)
- Chiasmia kirbyi (Wallengren, 1875)
- Chiasmia latimarginaria (Rebel, 1907)
- Chiasmia lindemannae (D. S. Fletcher, 1958)
- Chiasmia livorosa (Herbulot, 1964)
- Chiasmia maculosa (Warren, 1899)
- Chiasmia majestica (Warren, 1901)
- Chiasmia malefidaria (Mabille, 1880)
- Chiasmia malgassofusca Krüger, 2001
- Chiasmia marmorata (Warren, 1897)
- Chiasmia maronga Krüger, 2001
- Chiasmia megalesia (Viette, 1975)
- Chiasmia melsetter Krüger, 2001
- Chiasmia monopepla (Prout, 1934)
- Chiasmia monticolaria (Leech, 1897)
- Chiasmia morogoro Krüger, 2001
- Chiasmia multistrigata (Warren, 1897)
- Chiasmia murina Krüger, 2001
- Chiasmia nana (Warren, 1898)
- Chiasmia natalensis (Warren, 1904)
- Chiasmia neolivoros a Krüger, 2001
- Chiasmia nevilledukei Krüger, 2001
- Chiasmia ngami Krüger, 2001
- Chiasmia nobilitata (Prout, 1913)
- Chiasmia nora (Walker, 1861)
- Chiasmia normata (Walker, 1861)
- Chiasmia nubilata (Warren, 1897)
- Chiasmia obliquilineata (Warren, 1899)
- Chiasmia observata (Walker, 1861)
- Chiasmia olindaria (Swinhoe, 1904)
- Chiasmia orientalis Krüger, 2001
- Chiasmia orthostates (Prout, 1915)
- Chiasmia ostentosaria (Möschler, 1887)
- Chiasmia parallacta (Warren, 1897)
- Chiasmia parastreniata Krüger, 2001
- Chiasmia paucimacula Krüger, 2001
- Chiasmia percnoptera (Prout, 1915)
- Chiasmia peremarginata Krüger, 2001
- Chiasmia pervittata (Hampson, 1909)
- Chiasmia phaeostigma (D. S. Fletcher, 1958)
- Chiasmia pinheyi Krüger, 2001
- Chiasmia plutocrypsis (Herbulot, 1987)
- Chiasmia procidata (Guenée, 1858)
- Chiasmia puerilis (Prout, 1916)
- Chiasmia punctilinea (Prout, 1917)
- Chiasmia rectilinea (Warren, 1905)
- Chiasmia rectistriaria (Herrich-Schäffer, 1854)
- Chiasmia rhabdophora (Holland, 1892)
- Chiasmia sangueresara Krüger, 2001
- Chiasmia sareptanaria (Staudinger, 1871)
- Chiasmia semialbida (Prout, 1915)
- Chiasmia semicolor (Warren, 1899)
- Chiasmia semiolivacea Krüger, 2001
- Chiasmia semitecta (Walker, 1861)
- Chiasmia senegambiensis Krüger, 2001
- Chiasmia separata (Druce, 1883)
- Chiasmia simplex Krüger, 2001
- Chiasmia simplicilinea (Warren, 1905)
- Chiasmia somalica Krüger, 2001
- Chiasmia sordidula (Bastelberger, 1909)
- Chiasmia soror Krüger, 2001
- Chiasmia sororcula (Warren, 1897)
- Chiasmia streniata (Guenée, 1858)
- Chiasmia subcretata (Warren, 1905)
- Chiasmia subcurvaria (Mabille, 1897)
- Chiasmia subvaria (Bastelberger, 1907)
- Chiasmia sudanata (Warren & Rothschild, 1905)
- Chiasmia sufflata (Guenée, 1858)
- Chiasmia suriens (Strand, 1912)
- Chiasmia syriacaria (Staudinger, 1871)
- Chiasmia tecnium (Prout, 1916)
- Chiasmia tetragraphicata (Saalmüller, 1880)
- Chiasmia threnopis (D. S. Fletcher, 1963)
- Chiasmia trigonoleuca (Herbulot, 1987)
- Chiasmia trinotata (Warren, 1902)
- Chiasmia trinotatula Krüger, 2001
- Chiasmia trirecurvata (Saalmüller, 1891)
- Chiasmia tristis Krüger, 2001
- Chiasmia trizonaria (Hampson, 1909)
- Chiasmia tsaratanana (Viette, 1980)
- Chiasmia turbulentata (Guenée, 1858)
- Chiasmia umbrata (Warren, 1897)
- Chiasmia umbratilis (Butler, 1875)
- Chiasmia unifilata (Warren, 1899)
- Chiasmia uniformis Krüger, 2001
- Chiasmia unigeminata (Prout, 1923)
- Chiasmia vau (Prout, 1913)
- Chiasmia velia Agassiz, 2009
- Chiasmia warreni (Prout, 1915)
- Chiasmia zelota Prout, 1922
- Chiasmia zobrysi Krüger, 2001
