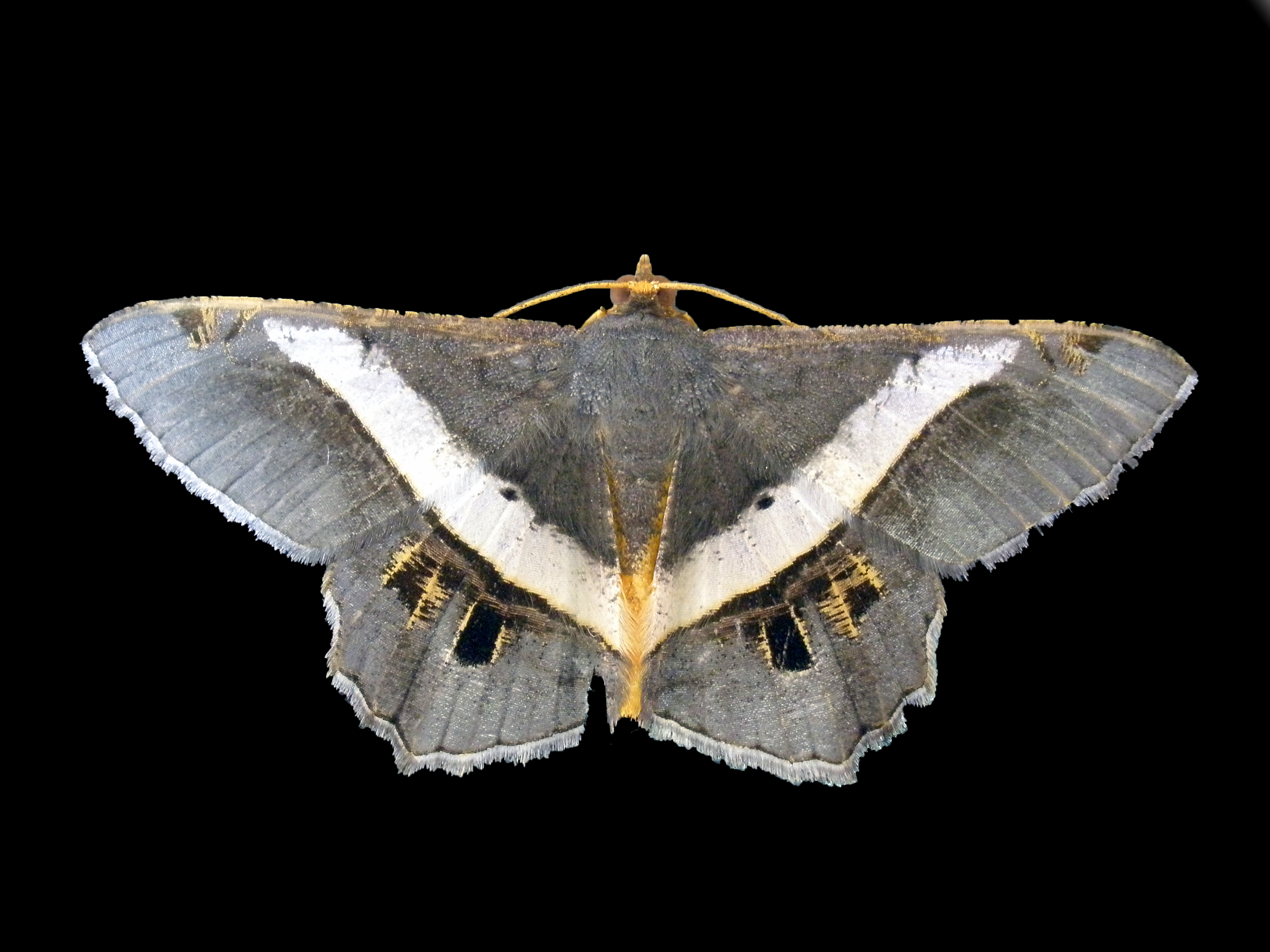

Scientific classification
- Domain: Eukaryota
- Kingdom: Animalia
- Phylum: Arthropoda
- Class: Insecta
- Order: Lepidoptera
- Family: Geometridae
- Genus: Semiothisa
- Species: S. eleonora

Binomial name
- Semiothisa eleonora (Villers, 1789)

Synonyms
- Semiothisa (Godonela) eleonora (Cramer, 1780); Godonela eleonora (Cramer, [1780]); Phalaena eleonora Cramer, [1780]; Semiothisa fasciosaria Hübner, [1823]; Phalaena fasciata Fabricius, 1775; Macaria fasciata (Fabricius, 1775); Chiasmia eleonora (Cramer, [1780])

= Semiothisa eleonora =

Species of moth

Semiothisa eleonora is a moth of the family Geometridae. It is found in south-west Asia, including India, Sri Lanka and Taiwan.

== Description ==
Its wingspan is about 42 mm. Forewings with outer margin slightly angled at vein 4. Male with the hind tibia dilated. Male slaty greyish in color. Palpi, antennae and abdomen orange colored except on dorsum. Forewings with indistinct curved and waved antemedial line. A broad white medial band not reaching costa, with a line beyond it bent outwards below the costa and nearly met by a fuscous orange-speckled blotch from costa. Cilia whitish, fuscous below apex. Hindwings with broad medial white band enclosing a speck at end of cell, and with a dark line on its outer edge, beyond which are two orange blotches irrorated with black. Lower and often the upper with a black patch at center. Cilia white. Ventral side with orange wing base.

Female more irrorated with fuscous. Often suffused with rufous, and with pale band grey. Cilia fuscous. Ventral side with orange outer area and white blotches. Larva greenish, with dorsal and sublateral yellow stripes or brown with white stripes.

Paired brush organs, which are used as pheromone producing hormones are found at ventral junction of femur and tibia of the hindleg.

The larva is a pest which is known to attack Mimosa rubicaulis and Acacia concinna.
