= Scopula fumosaria =

Scientific classification
- Kingdom: Animalia
- Phylum: Arthropoda
- Clade: Pancrustacea
- Class: Insecta
- Order: Lepidoptera
- Family: Geometridae
- Genus: Scopula
- Species: S. fumosaria

Binomial name
- Scopula fumosaria (Prout, 1913)

Synonyms
- Acidalia fumosaria Prout, 1913

Species of geometer moth in subfamily Sterrhinae

Scopula fumosaria is a moth of the family Geometridae. It is found in the Lake Baikal region.

== Taxonomy ==
The name Scopula fumosaria is a junior secondary homonym of Emmiltis fumosaria, described by Robert Swinhoe in 1904 and requires a replacement name.
