= Scopula bigeminata =

Scientific classification
- Domain: Eukaryota
- Kingdom: Animalia
- Phylum: Arthropoda
- Class: Insecta
- Order: Lepidoptera
- Family: Geometridae
- Genus: Scopula
- Species: S. bigeminata

Binomial name
- Scopula bigeminata (Warren, 1897)

Synonyms
- Craspedia bigeminata Warren, 1897; Emmiltis fumosaria Swinhoe, 1904; Emmiltis bigeminata ab. rufifimbria Warren, 1914

Species of geometer moth in subfamily Sterrhinae

Scopula bigeminata is a moth of the family Geometridae. It was described by entomologist William Warren in 1897. Scopula bigeminata ranges widely in Africa, including Angola, Cameroon, Ethiopia, Kenya, Malawi, South Africa, Sudan and Uganda.
