= Scopula mollicula =

Scientific classification
- Kingdom: Animalia
- Phylum: Arthropoda
- Clade: Pancrustacea
- Class: Insecta
- Order: Lepidoptera
- Family: Geometridae
- Genus: Scopula
- Species: S. mollicula

Binomial name
- Scopula mollicula Prout, 1932

Species of geometer moth in subfamily Sterrhinae

Scopula mollicula is a moth of the family Geometridae. It is found on Madagascar.

This species resembles Scopula caducaria (Swinhoe, 1904) in size, shape, and coloration, although it is less glossy. Both wings feature a prominent cell dot, and the median and postmedian lines on the forewings are positioned more distally compared to those in S.caducaria.
