= Scopula subdecorata =

Scientific classification
- Domain: Eukaryota
- Kingdom: Animalia
- Phylum: Arthropoda
- Class: Insecta
- Order: Lepidoptera
- Family: Geometridae
- Genus: Scopula
- Species: S. subdecorata

Binomial name
- Scopula subdecorata (Warren, 1896)

Synonyms
- Craspedia subdecorata Warren, 1896

Species of geometer moth in subfamily Sterrhinae

Scopula subdecorata is a moth of the family Geometridae. It is found on Borneo.

Scopula subdecorata is the montane sister-species of Scopula vacuata.
