= Scopula vacuata =

Scientific classification
- Kingdom: Animalia
- Phylum: Arthropoda
- Class: Insecta
- Order: Lepidoptera
- Family: Geometridae
- Genus: Scopula
- Species: S. vacuata

Binomial name
- Scopula vacuata (Guenée, 1857)

Synonyms
- Acidalia vacuata Guenée, 1857; Acidalia vagata Walker, 1861

Species of geometer moth in subfamily Sterrhinae

Scopula vacuata is a moth of the family Geometridae. It is found on Borneo. The habitat consists of lowland forests but it can occur as high as 1,000 metres in the lower montane forest zone.
