= Scopula convergens =

Scientific classification
- Domain: Eukaryota
- Kingdom: Animalia
- Phylum: Arthropoda
- Class: Insecta
- Order: Lepidoptera
- Family: Geometridae
- Genus: Scopula
- Species: S. convergens

Binomial name
- Scopula convergens (Warren, 1904)

Synonyms
- Emmiltis convergens Warren, 1904; Craspedia convergens

Species of geometer moth in subfamily Sterrhinae

Scopula convergens is a moth of the family Geometridae. It was described by Warren in 1904. It is endemic to Colombia.
