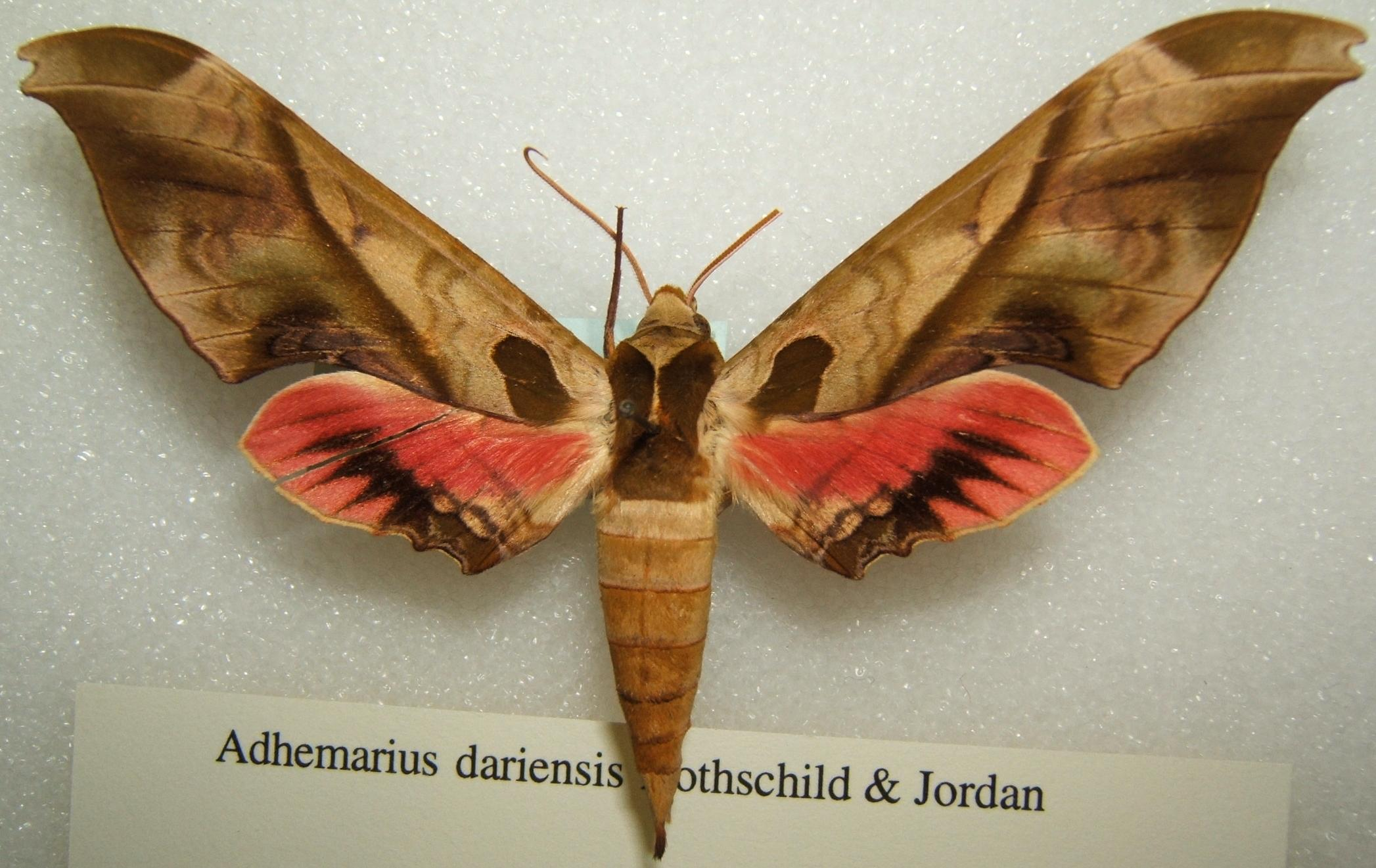
- Adhemarius dariensis, adult

Scientific classification
- Domain: Eukaryota
- Kingdom: Animalia
- Phylum: Arthropoda
- Class: Insecta
- Order: Lepidoptera
- Family: Sphingidae
- Genus: Adhemarius
- Species: A. dariensis

Binomial name
- Adhemarius dariensis (Rothschild & Jordan, 1916)

Synonyms
- Amplypterus dariensis Rothschild & Jordan, 1916

= Adhemarius dariensis =

Species of moth

Adhemarius dariensis is a species of moth in the family Sphingidae. It is known from Costa Rica, Mexico, Nicaragua and Panama.

The wingspan is 107–111 mm for males and 124 mm for females. Adults are probably on wing year round.

The larvae probably feed on Ocotea species, such as Ocotea veraguensis, Ocotea atirrensis and Ocotea dendrodaphne.
