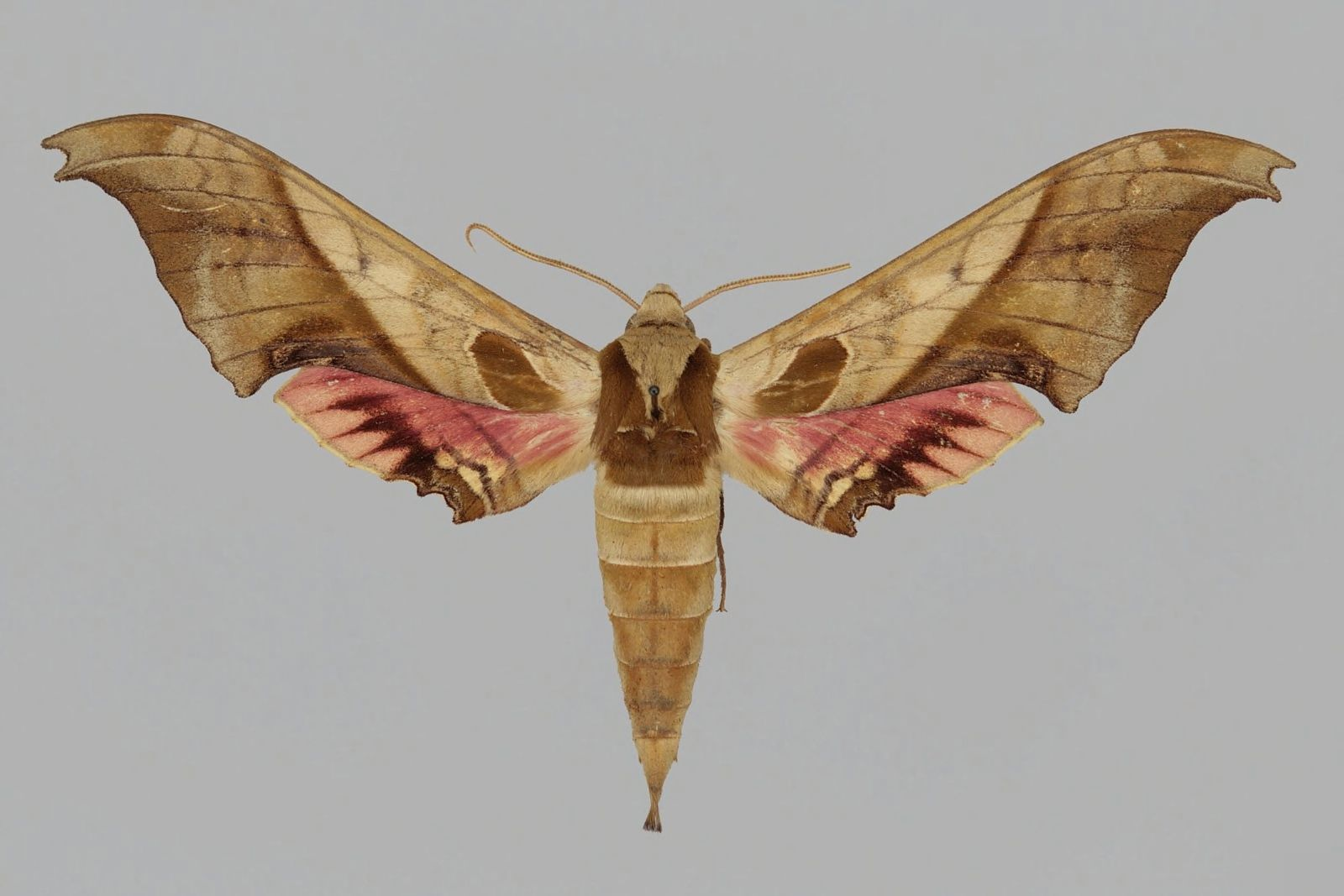
- Male, upperside

Scientific classification
- Domain: Eukaryota
- Kingdom: Animalia
- Phylum: Arthropoda
- Class: Insecta
- Order: Lepidoptera
- Family: Sphingidae
- Genus: Adhemarius
- Species: A. mexicanus

Binomial name
- Adhemarius mexicanus Balcázar-Lara & Beutelspacher, 2001

= Adhemarius mexicanus =

Species of moth

Adhemarius mexicanus is a species of moth in the family Sphingidae. It was described by Manuel Artemio Balcázar-Lara and Carlos R. Beutelspacher in 2001, and is known from Mexico, where it is found from Oaxaca to Jalisco.
