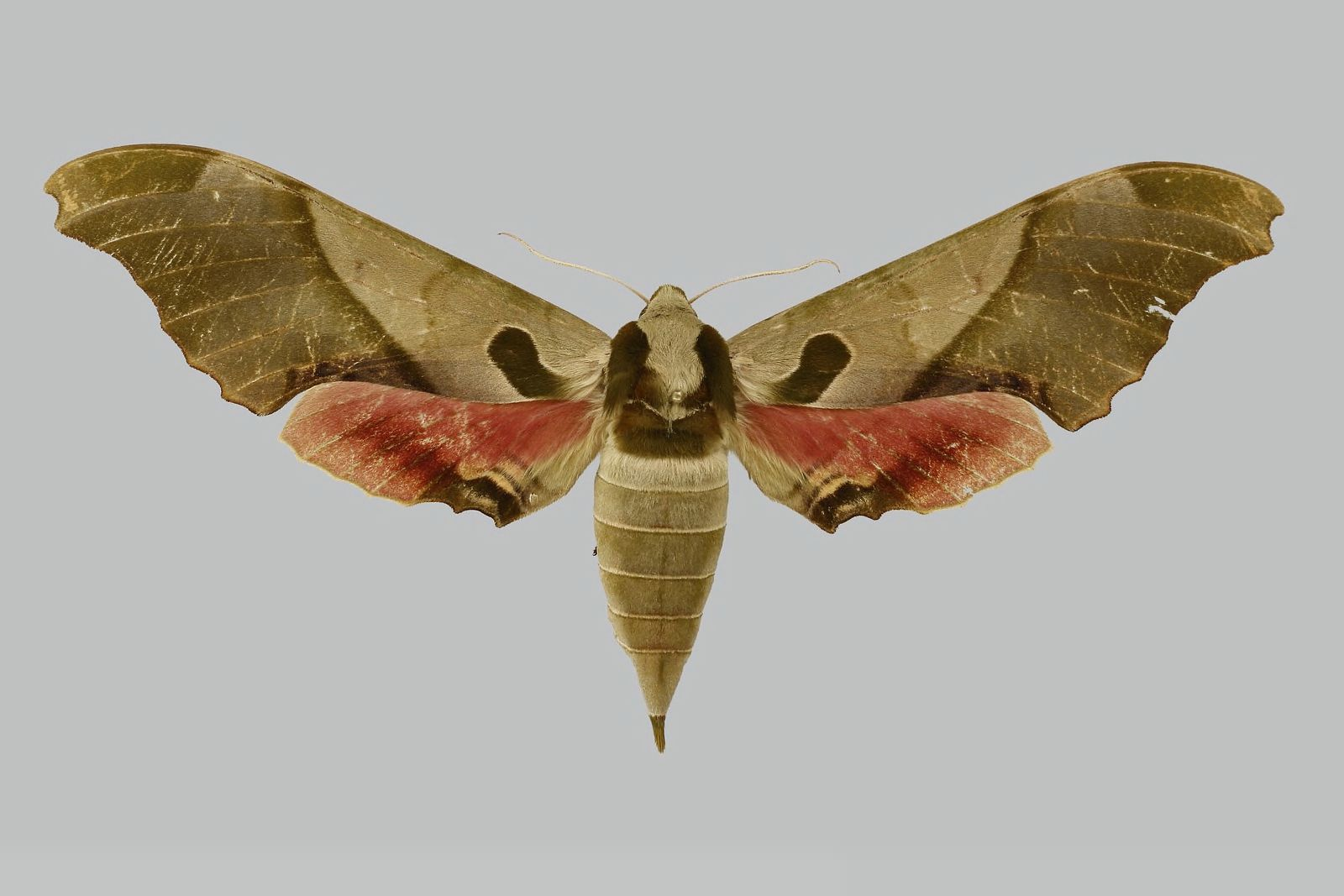
- Female, upperside

Scientific classification
- Domain: Eukaryota
- Kingdom: Animalia
- Phylum: Arthropoda
- Class: Insecta
- Order: Lepidoptera
- Family: Sphingidae
- Genus: Adhemarius
- Species: A. blanchardorum

Binomial name
- Adhemarius blanchardorum (Hodges, 1985)

Synonyms
- Amplypterus blanchardorum Hodges, 1985

= Adhemarius blanchardorum =

Blanchard's sphinx moth

Species of moth

Adhemarius blanchardorum, or Blanchard's sphinx moth, is a species of moth in the family Sphingidae. It was described by Ronald W. Hodges in 1985, and is known from the Green Gulch in the Chisos Mountains in Texas. It is probably also found in the neighbouring mountains of Mexico.

The length of the forewings is 43–53 mm. It is similar to Protambulyx strigilis, but can be distinguished by the green spots and the large dark basal spot on the forewing.
