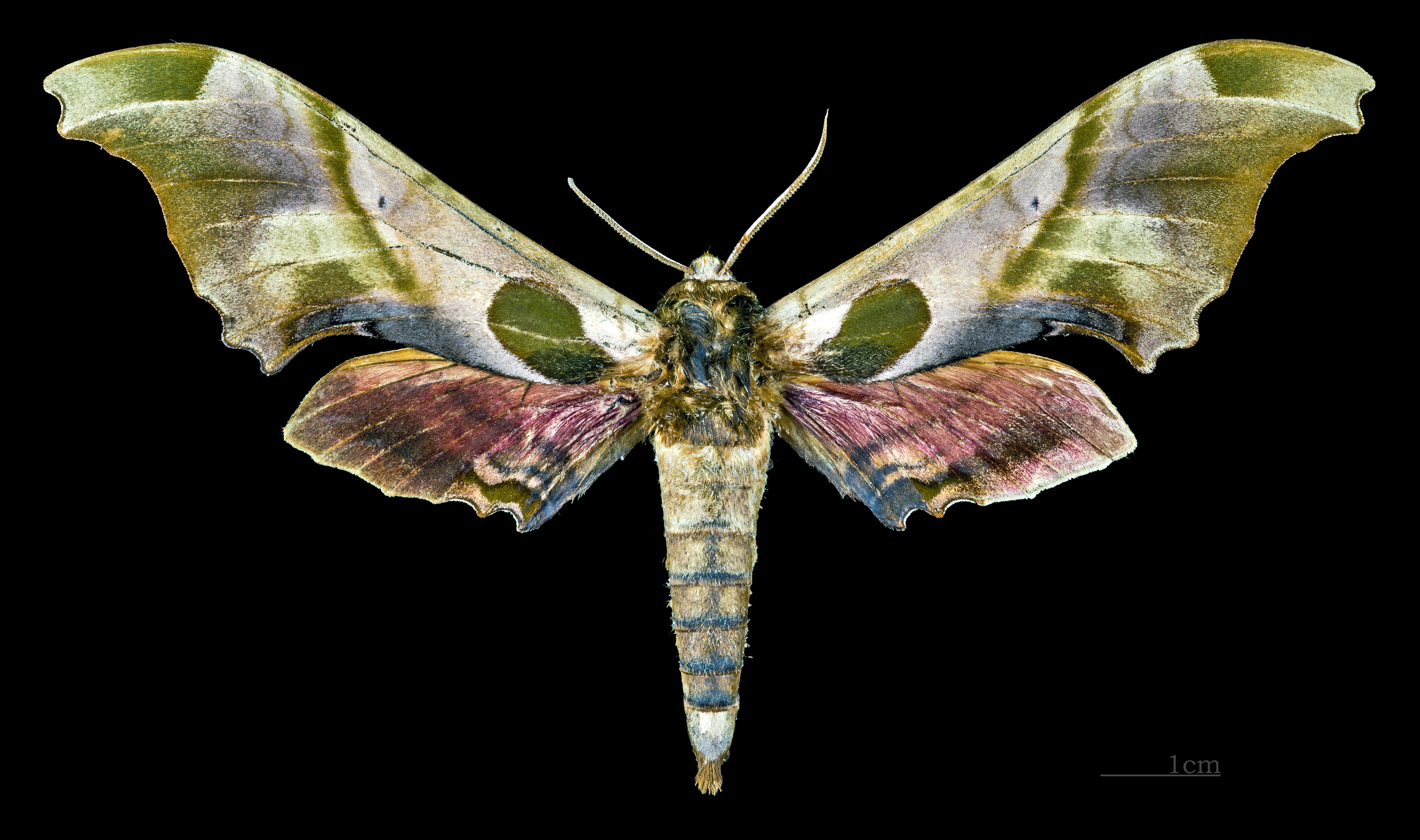
- Male dorsal - MHNT
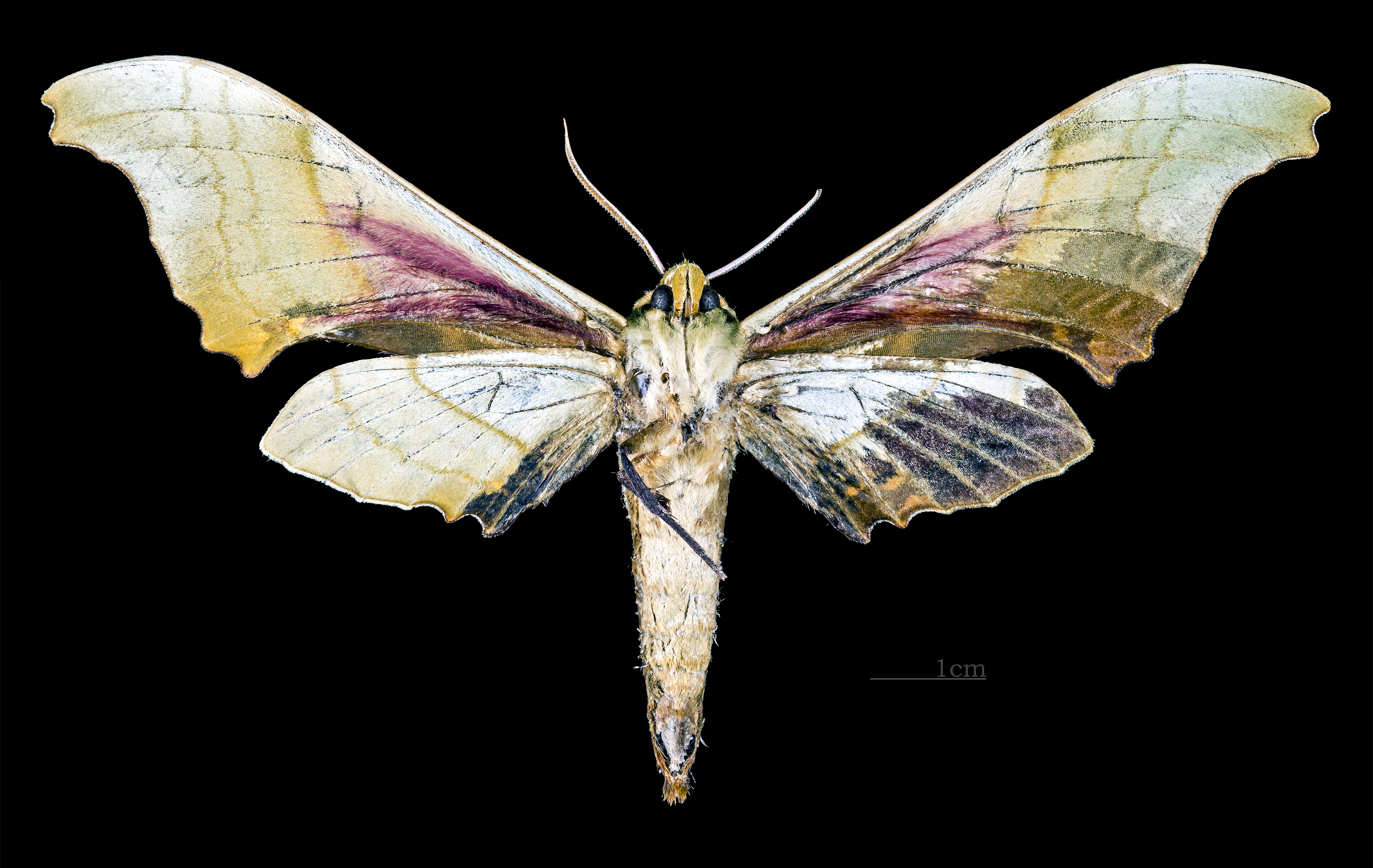
- Male ventral - MHNT

Scientific classification
- Kingdom: Animalia
- Phylum: Arthropoda
- Class: Insecta
- Order: Lepidoptera
- Family: Sphingidae
- Genus: Adhemarius
- Species: A. globifer

Binomial name
- Adhemarius globifer (Dyar, 1912)

Synonyms
- Amplypterus globifer Dyar, 1912

= Adhemarius globifer =

Species of moth

Adhemarius globifer is a species of moth in the family Sphingidae. It was described by Harrison Gray Dyar Jr. and 1912, and is found from Mexico to southern Arizona.

Adults are probably on wing year round.
