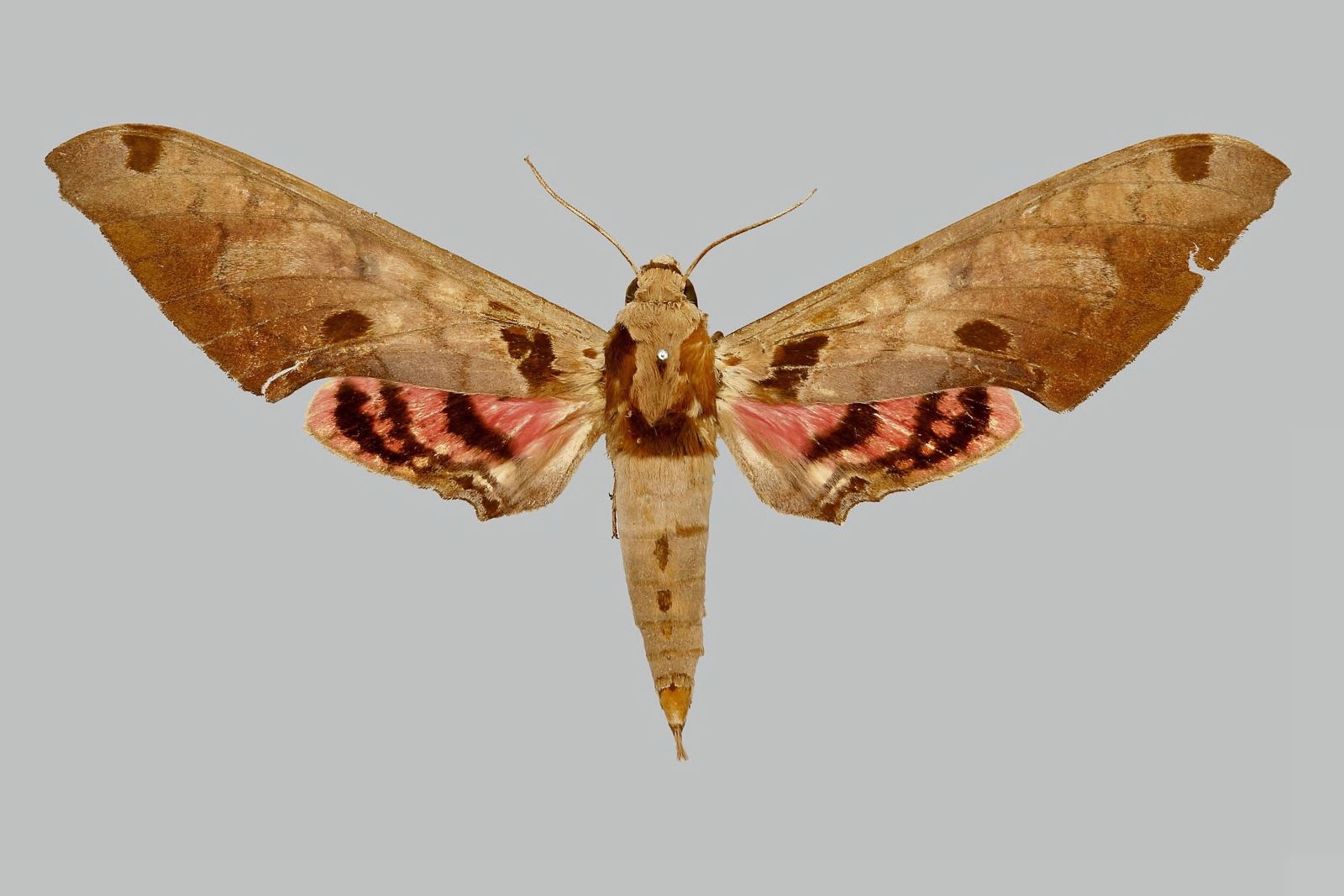
- Male from Brazil, upperside

Scientific classification
- Domain: Eukaryota
- Kingdom: Animalia
- Phylum: Arthropoda
- Class: Insecta
- Order: Lepidoptera
- Family: Sphingidae
- Genus: Adhemarius
- Species: A. daphne

Binomial name
- Adhemarius daphne (Boisduval, 1875)

Synonyms
- Ambulyx daphne Boisduval, 1875; Amplypterus daphne mollis (Gehlen, 1928); Amplypterus daphne cubanus Rothschild & Jordan, 1908; Amplypterus daphne interrupta Closs, 1915; Amplypterus daphne acostalis (Closs, 1915)

= Adhemarius daphne =

Species of moth

Adhemarius daphne is a species of moth in the family Sphingidae. It was described by Jean Baptiste Boisduval in 1875, and it is known from Brazil, Bolivia, Argentina and Paraguay, as well as Cuba and Costa Rica.

There are probably at least two generations per year. In Brazil, adults have been recorded in March and November.

== Subspecies ==
- Adhemarius daphne daphne (Brazil, Bolivia, Argentina and Paraguay)
- Adhemarius daphne cubanus (Rothschild & Jordan, 1908) (Cuba)
- Adhemarius daphne interrupta (Closs, 1915) (Costa Rica)
