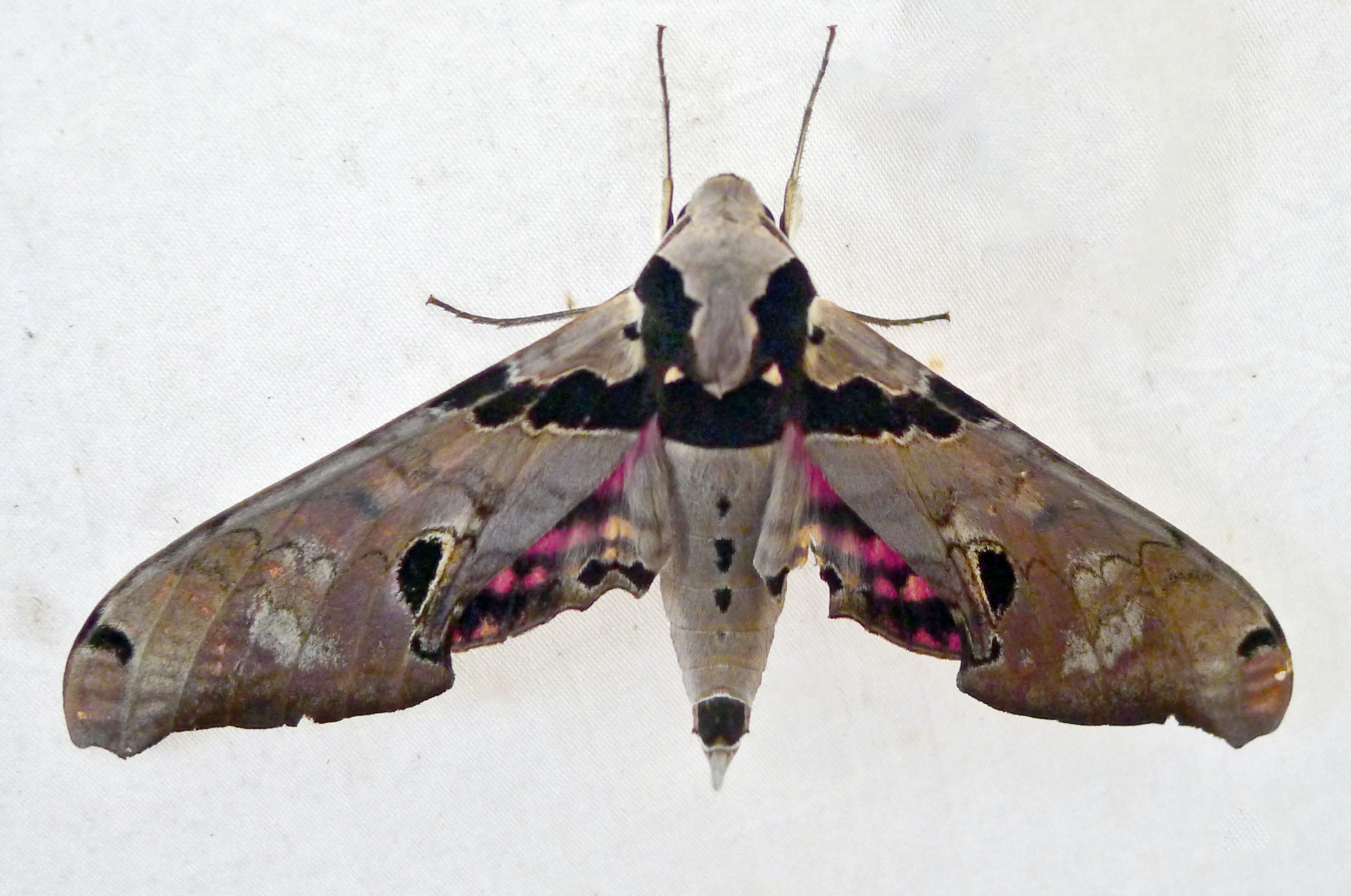

Scientific classification
- Domain: Eukaryota
- Kingdom: Animalia
- Phylum: Arthropoda
- Class: Insecta
- Order: Lepidoptera
- Family: Sphingidae
- Genus: Adhemarius
- Species: A. dentoni

Binomial name
- Adhemarius dentoni (Clark, 1916)

Synonyms
- Amplypterus dentoni Clark, 1916

= Adhemarius dentoni =

Species of moth

Adhemarius dentoni is a species of moth in the family Sphingidae. It was described by Benjamin Preston Clark in 1916.

== Distribution ==
is found from Peru to Ecuador and has also been recorded from Bolivia.

== Description ==
The length of the forewings is 55–61 mm.

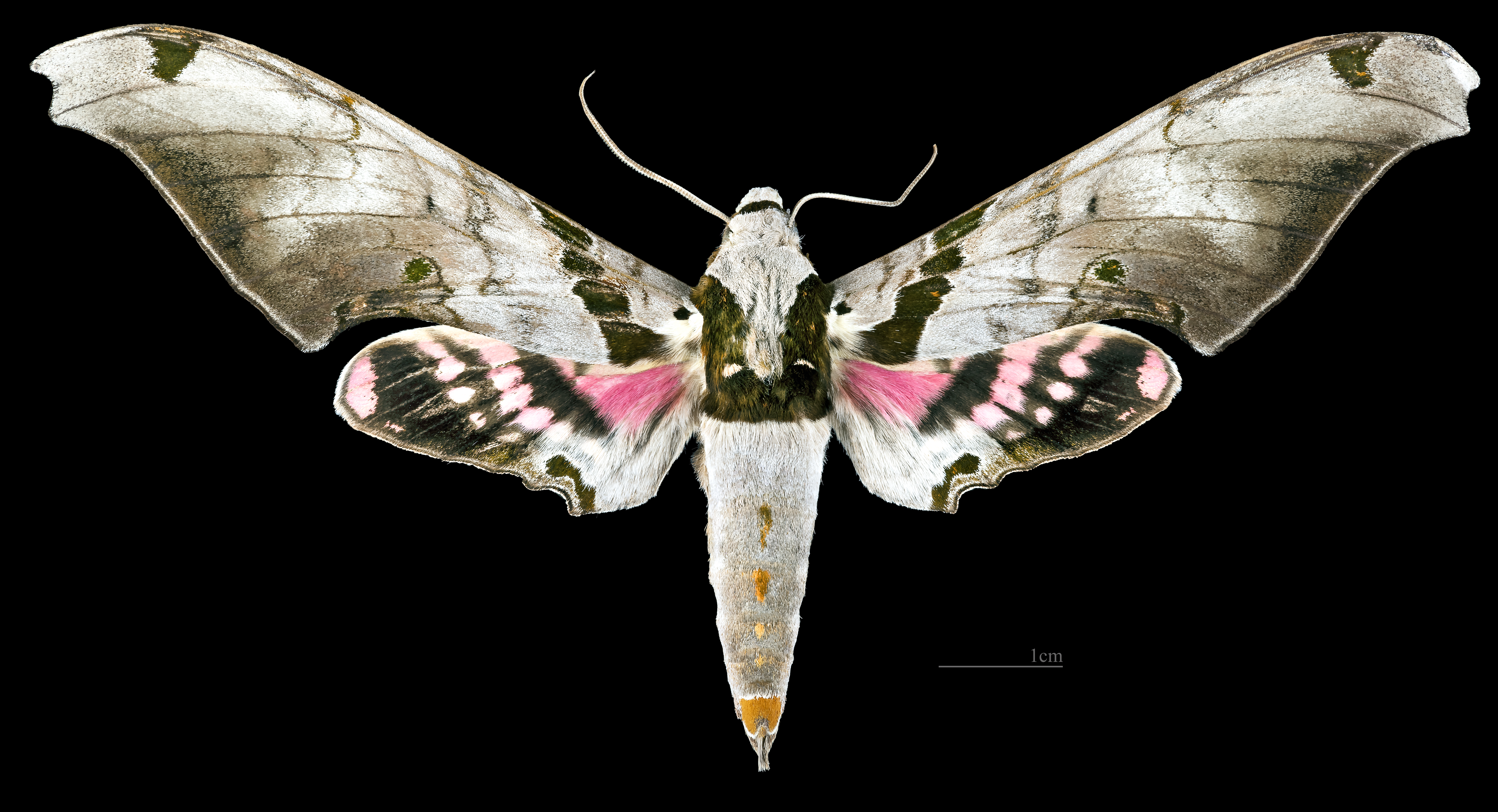
Male dorsal

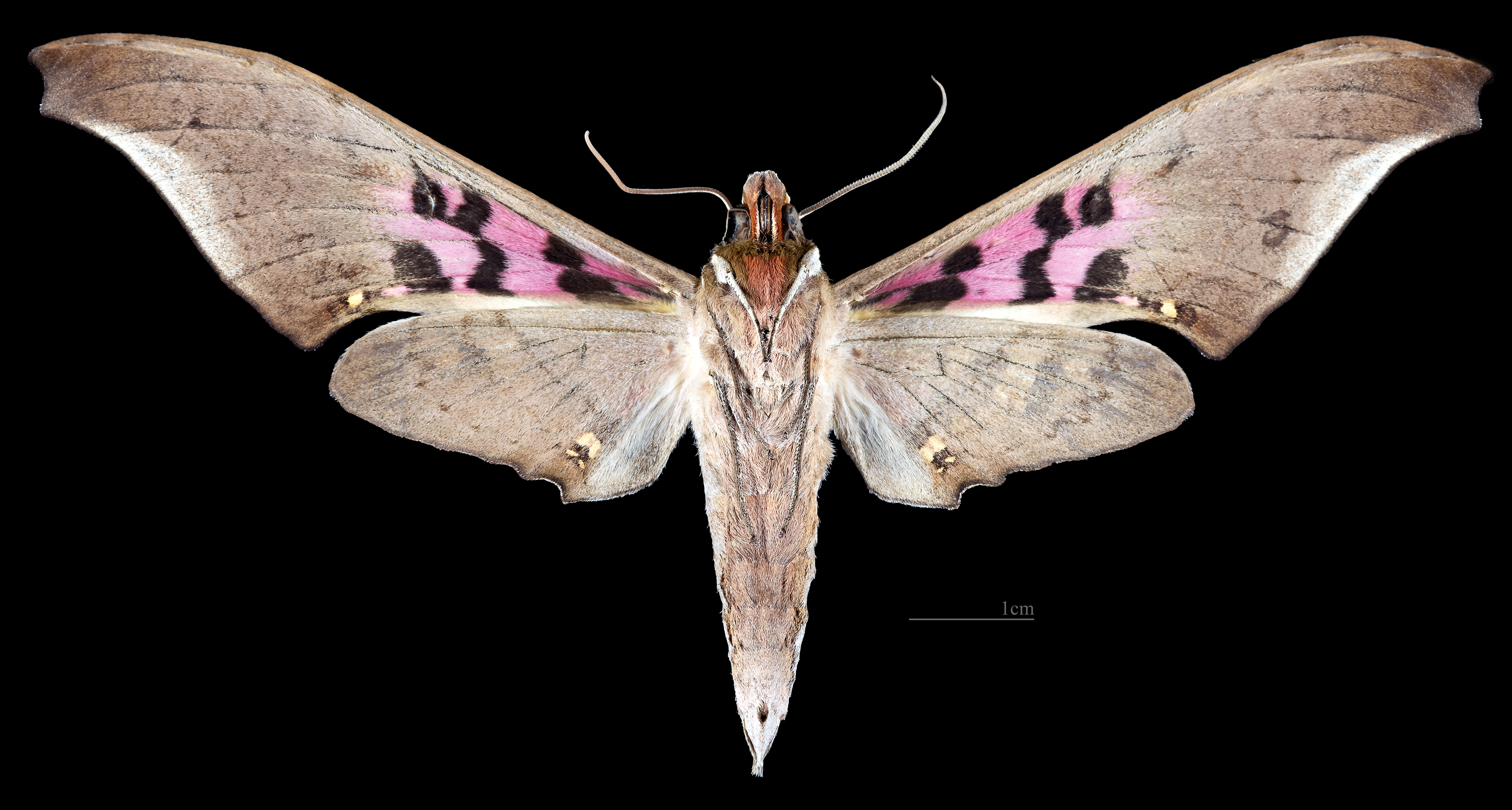
Male ventral

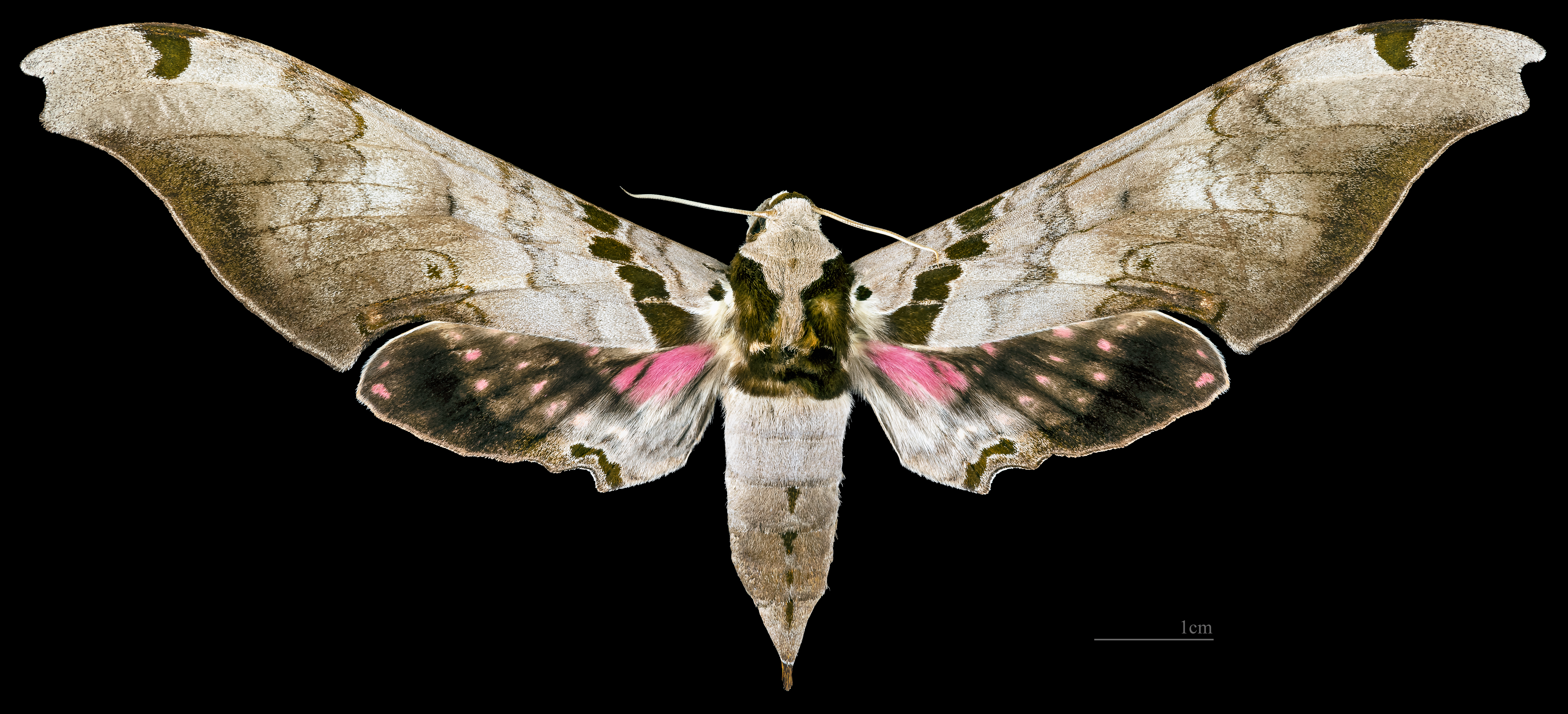
female dorsal

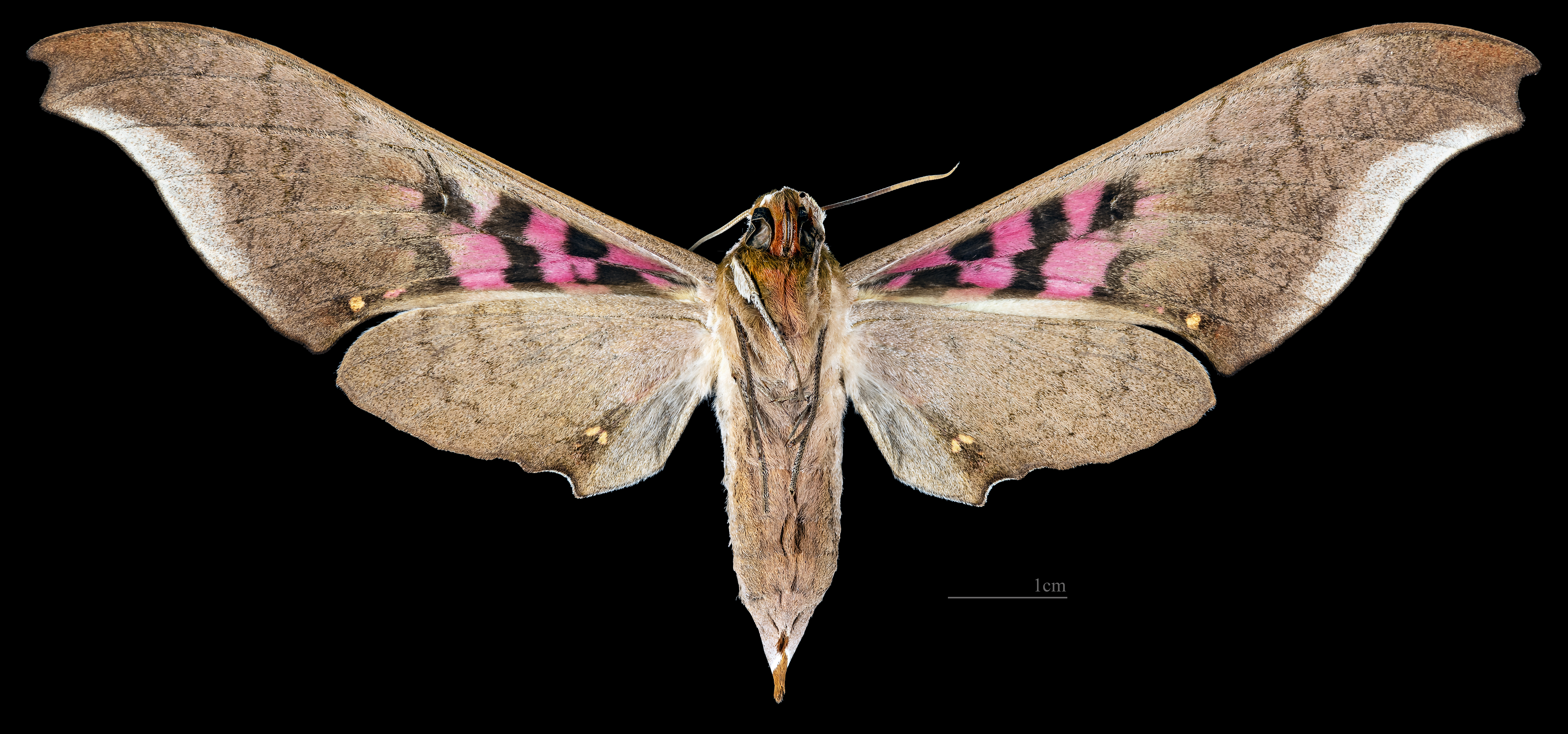
female dorsal

== Biology ==
There are at least two generations per year with peak flights from January to February and again from July to August. The larvae probably feed on Persea species.
