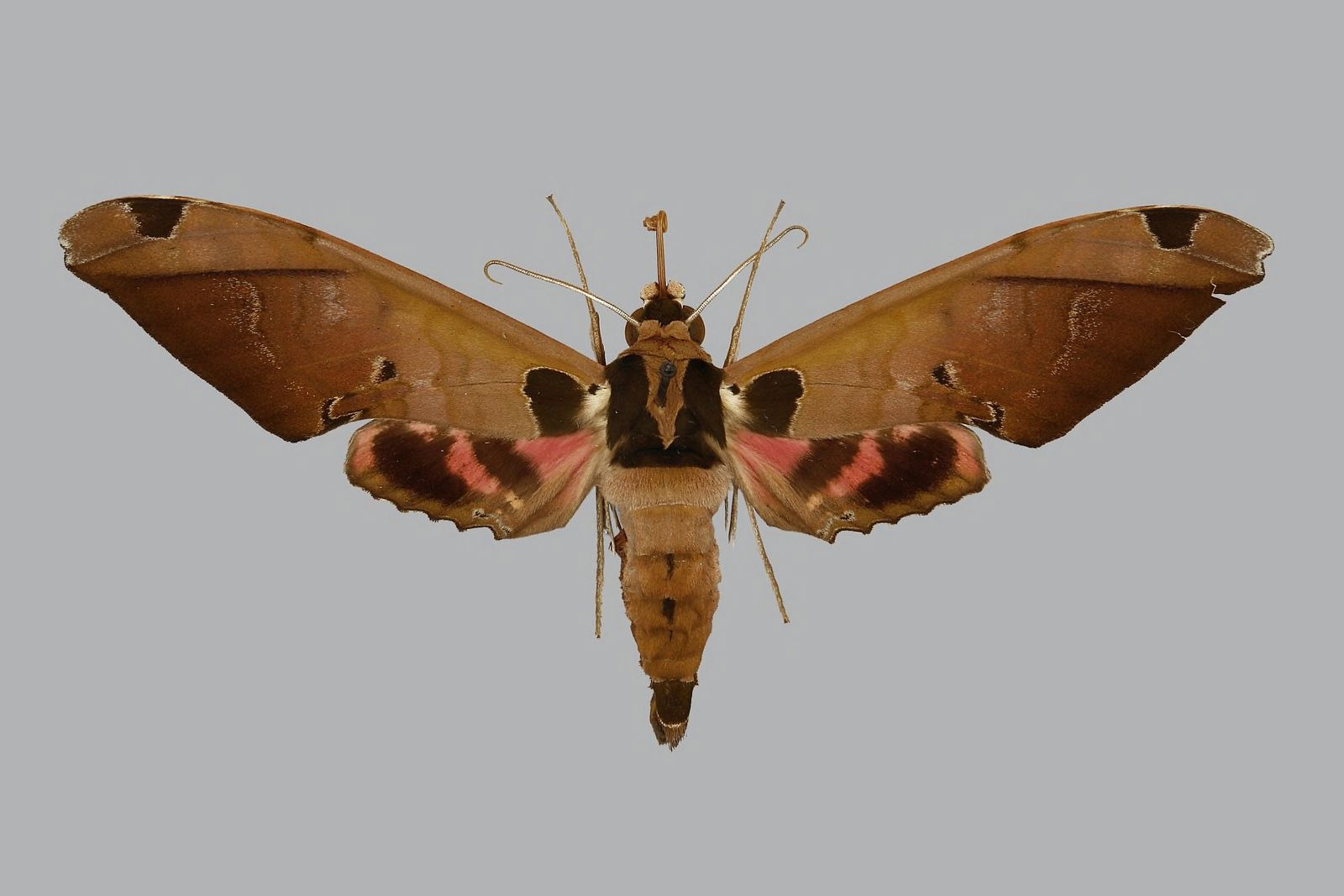
- Male, upperside
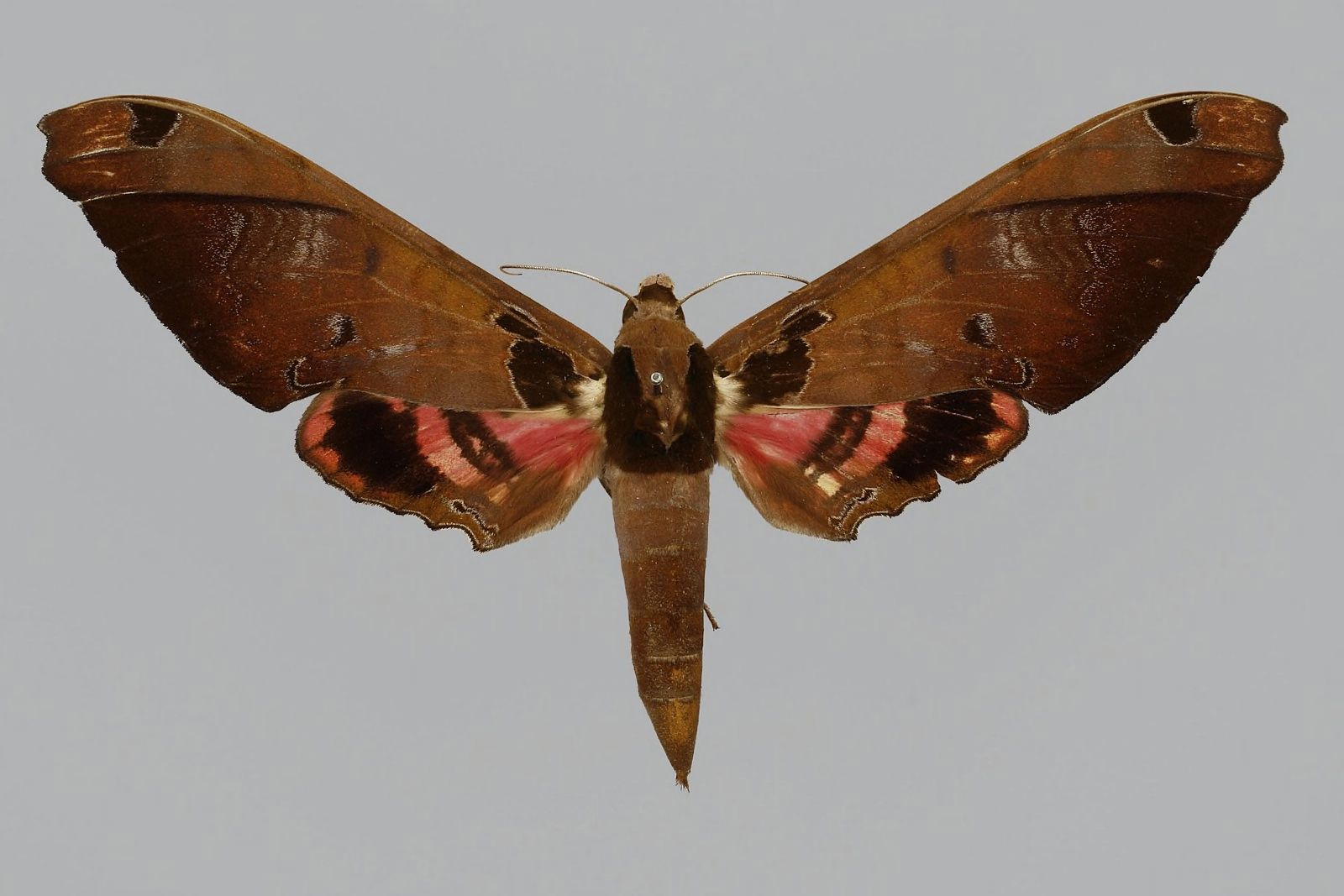
- Female, upperside

Scientific classification
- Kingdom: Animalia
- Phylum: Arthropoda
- Class: Insecta
- Order: Lepidoptera
- Family: Sphingidae
- Genus: Adhemarius
- Species: A. roessleri

Binomial name
- Adhemarius roessleri Eitschberger, 2002

= Adhemarius roessleri =

Species of moth

Adhemarius roessleri is a species of moth in the family Sphingidae. It was described by Ulf Eitschberger in 2002, and is known from Brazil, Colombia, Guyana, northern Peru and French Guiana.

There are probably at least two generations per year.

The larvae probably feed on Ocotea species, such as Ocotea veraguensis, Ocotea atirrensis and Ocotea dendrodaphne.
