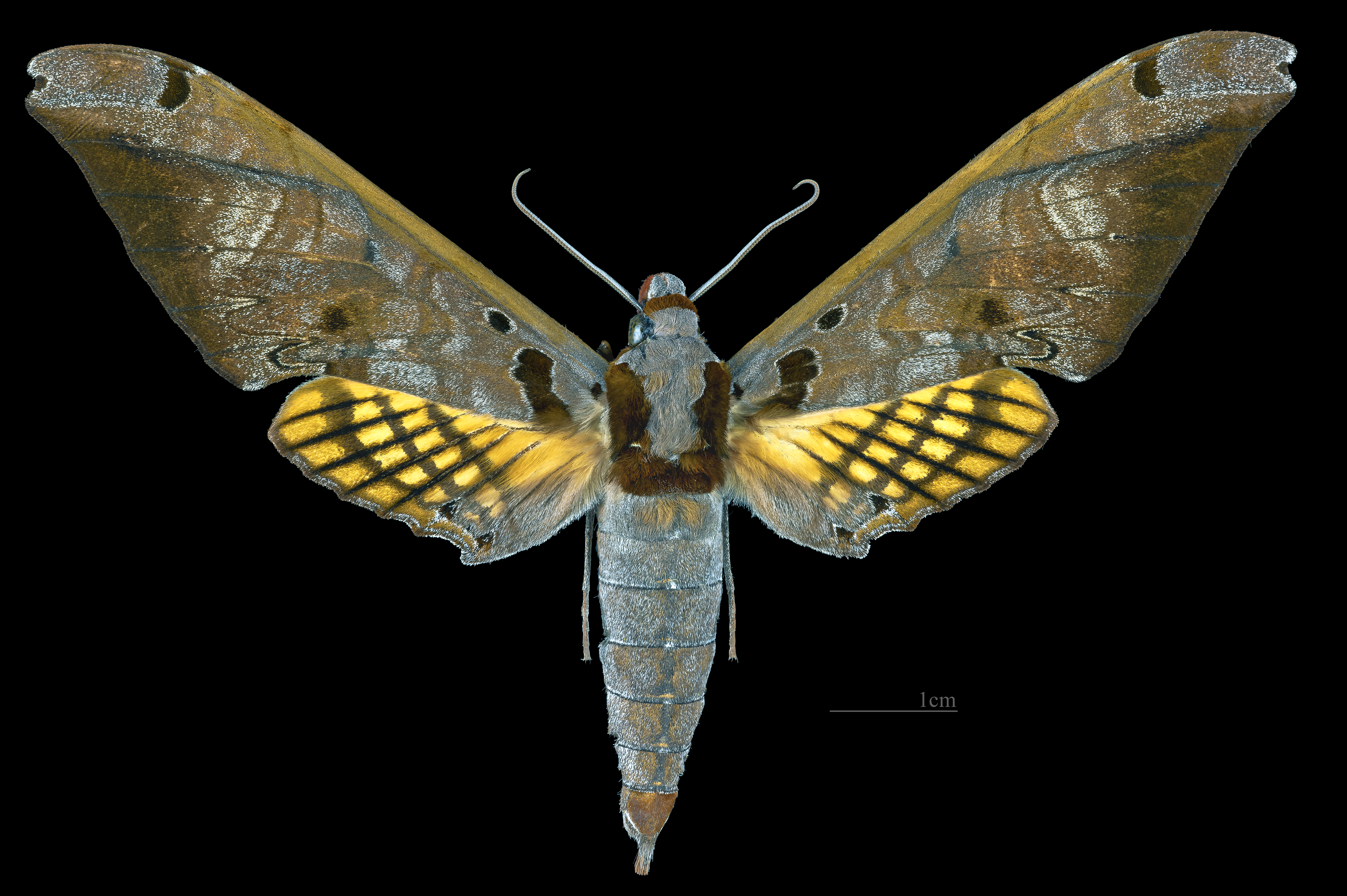
- Male dorsal
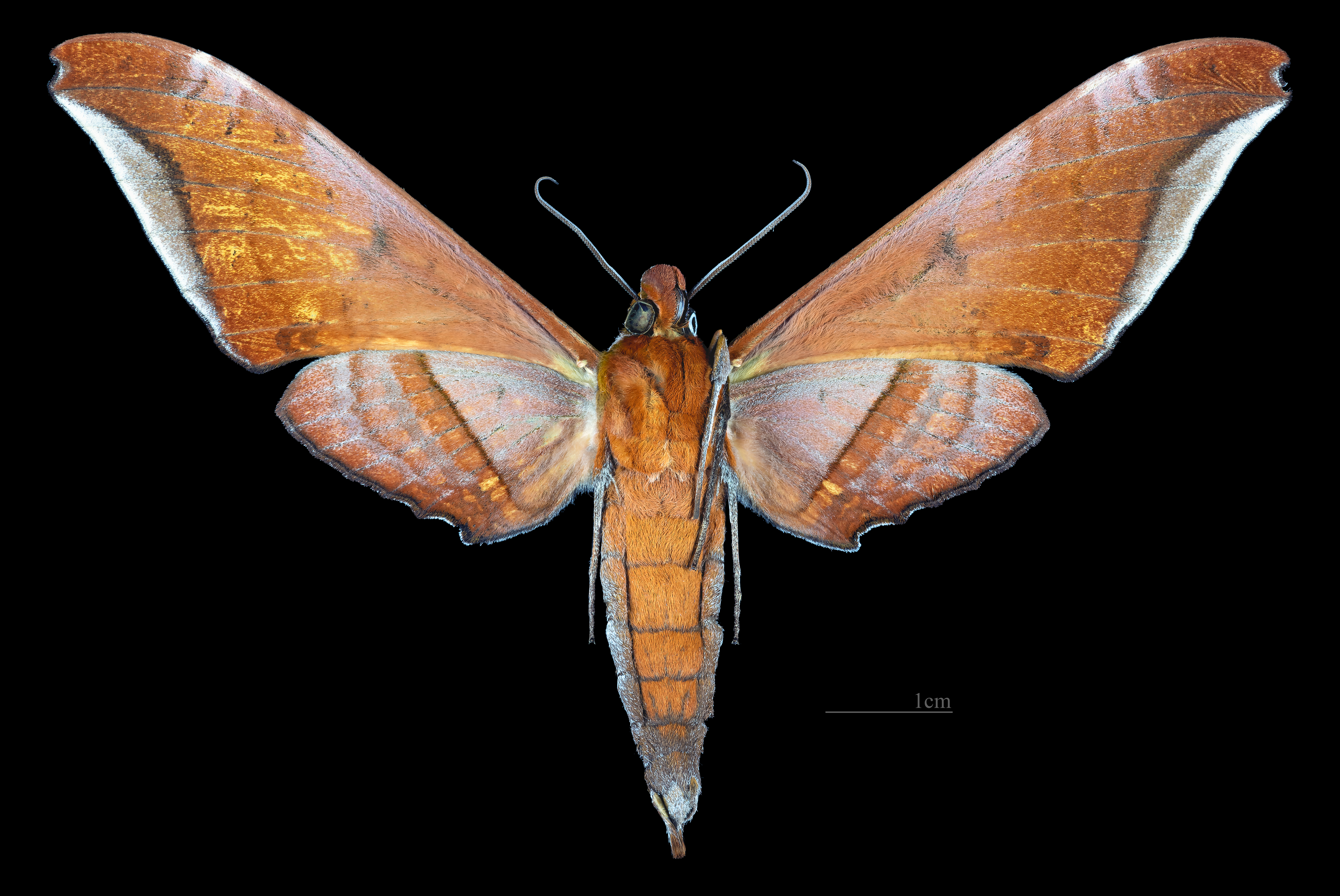
- Male ventral

Scientific classification
- Domain: Eukaryota
- Kingdom: Animalia
- Phylum: Arthropoda
- Class: Insecta
- Order: Lepidoptera
- Family: Sphingidae
- Genus: Adhemarius
- Species: A. tigrina

Binomial name
- Adhemarius tigrina (R. Felder, [1874])

Synonyms
- Ambulyx tigrina R. Felder, 1874; Adhemarius simera (Lichy, 1943); Amblypterus tigrina coronata Gehlen, 1930; Amplypterus tigrina simera Lichy, 1943

= Adhemarius tigrina =

Species of moth

Adhemarius tigrina is a moth of the family Sphingidae.

== Distribution ==
It is found from Peru to Venezuela. It has also been recorded in Bolivia. Subspecies coronata is found in Colombia.

== Description ==
The length of the forewings is 57–63 mm.

== Biology ==
- The species probably broods continuously, with records indicating adults are on wing from March to July and again in October.
- The larvae of ssp. tigrina probably feed on Ocotea veraguensis, Ocotea atirrensis, Ocotea sarah and Ocotea dendrodaphne. The larvae of ssp. coronata probably feed on Ocotea veraguensis, Ocotea atirrensis and Ocotea dendrodaphne.

== Subspecies ==
- Adhemarius tigrina tigrina (Peru to Venezuela and Bolivia)
- Adhemarius tigrina coronata (Colombia)
