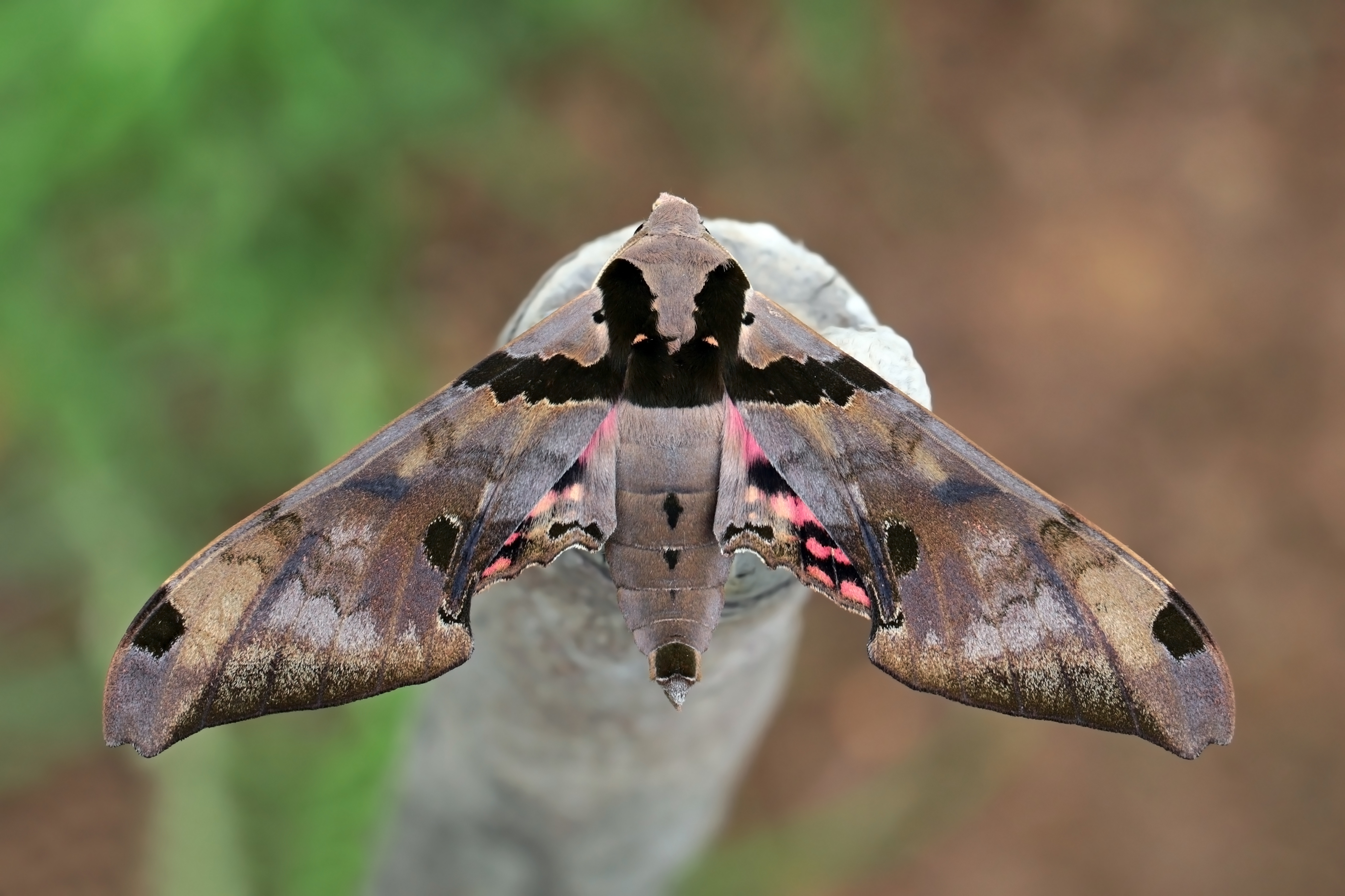
- Adhemarius gannascus Mount Totumas cloud forest, Panama

Scientific classification
- Kingdom: Animalia
- Phylum: Arthropoda
- Class: Insecta
- Order: Lepidoptera
- Family: Sphingidae
- Tribe: Ambulycini
- Genus: Adhemarius; Oitiaca, 1939

Species
- See text

= Adhemarius =

Genus of moths

Adhemarius is a genus of moths in the family Sphingidae first described by Oitiaca in 1939. They are found in the Americas.

== Species ==
- Adhemarius blanchardorum Hodges, 1985 – Blanchard's sphinx moth
- Adhemarius daphne (Boisduval, 1870)
- Adhemarius dariensis (Rothschild & Jordan, 1903)
- Adhemarius dentoni (Clark, 1916)
- Adhemarius donysa (Druce, 1889)
- Adhemarius eurysthenes (R. Felder, 1874)
- Adhemarius fulvescens (Closs, 1915)
- Adhemarius gagarini (Zikan, 1935)
- Adhemarius gannascus (Stoll, 1790)
- Adhemarius globifer (Dyar, 1912)
- Adhemarius jamaicensis (Rothschild & Jordan, 1915)
- Adhemarius mexicanus Balcázar-Lara & Beutelspacher, 2001
- Adhemarius palmeri (Boisduval, 1875)
- Adhemarius roessleri Eitschberger, 2002
- Adhemarius sexoculata (Grote, 1865)
- Adhemarius tigrina (Felder, 1874)
- Adhemarius ypsilon (Rothschild & Jordan, 1903)

== Gallery ==
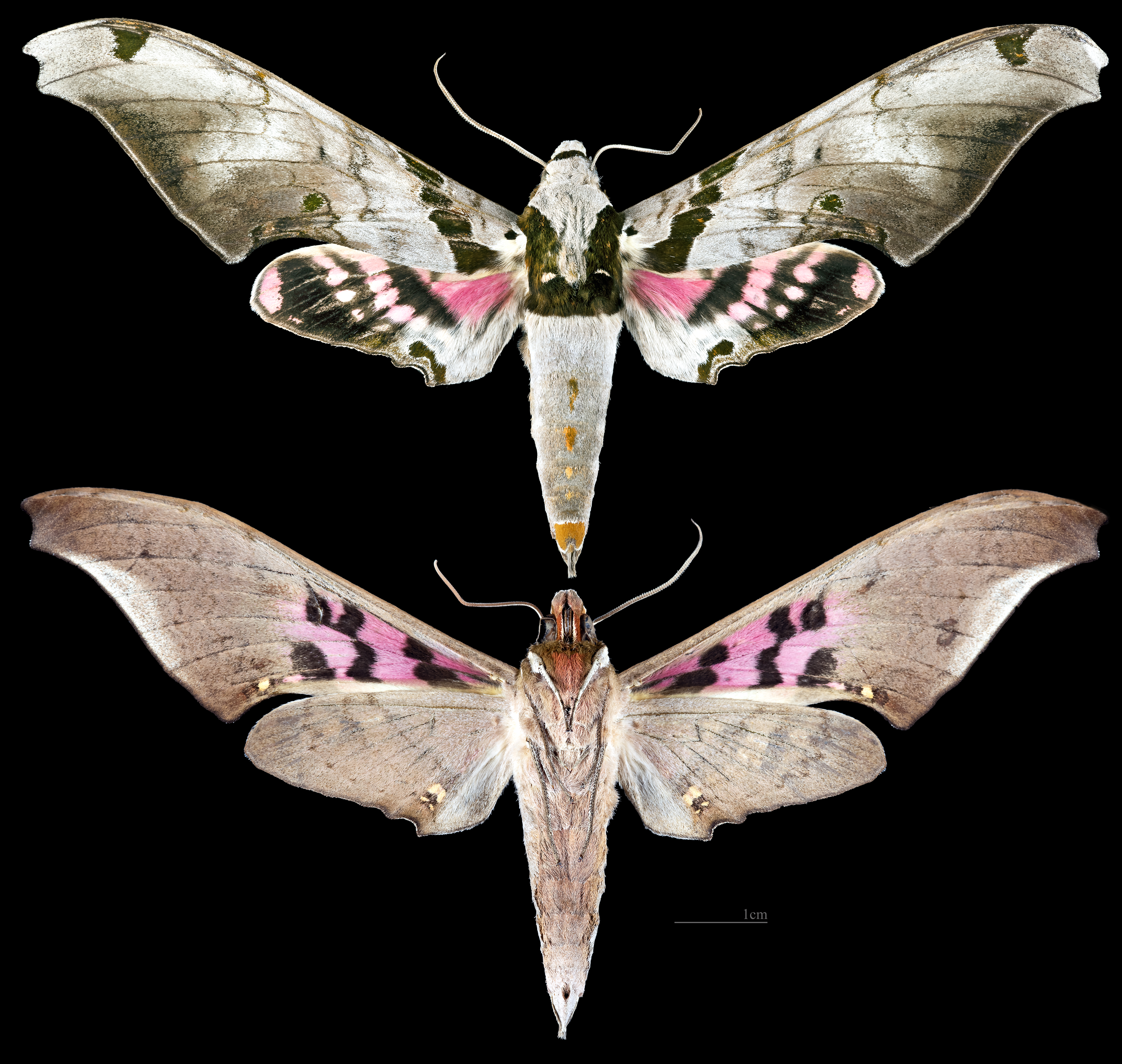
Adhemarius dentoni

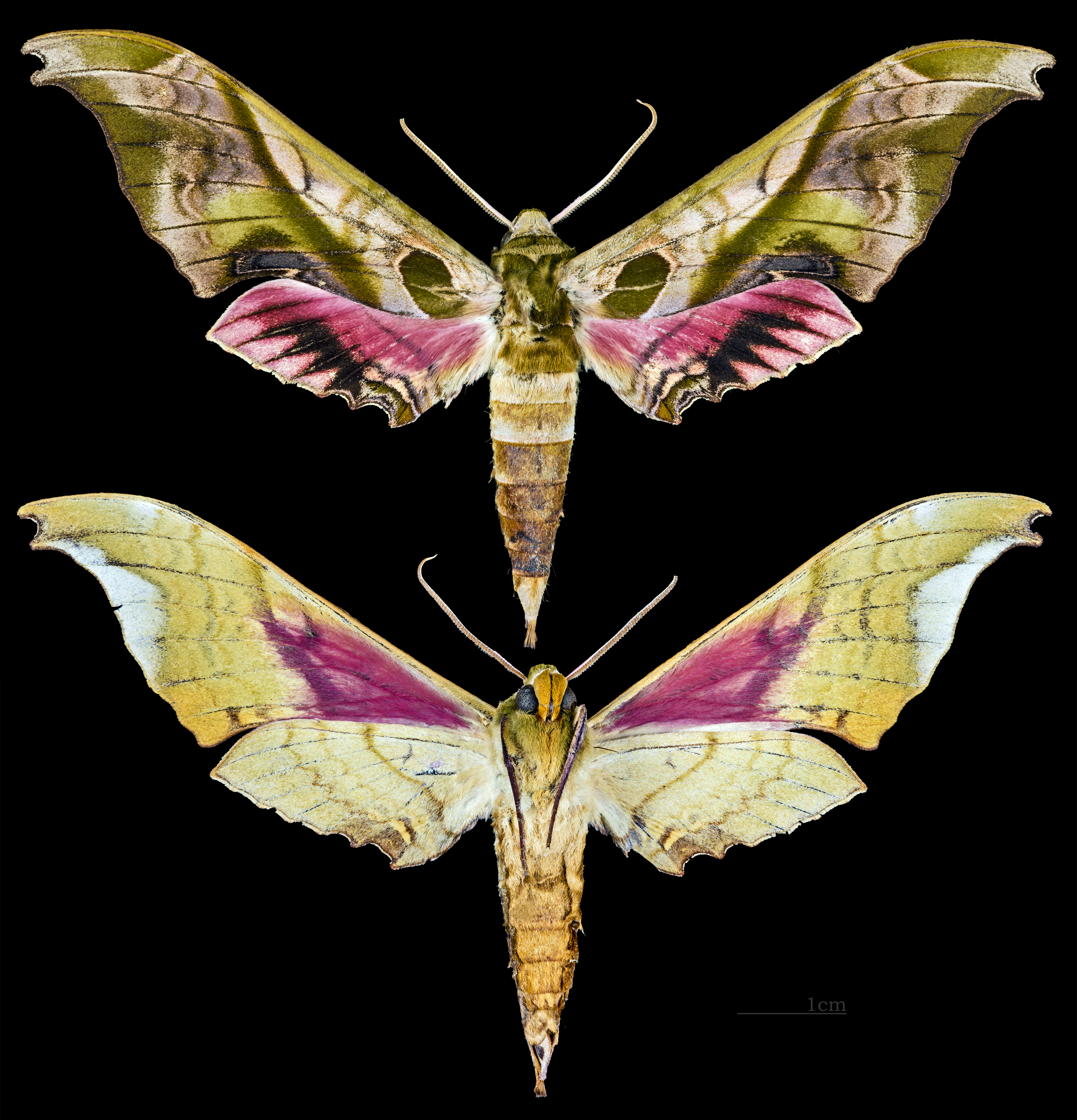
Adhemarius donysa

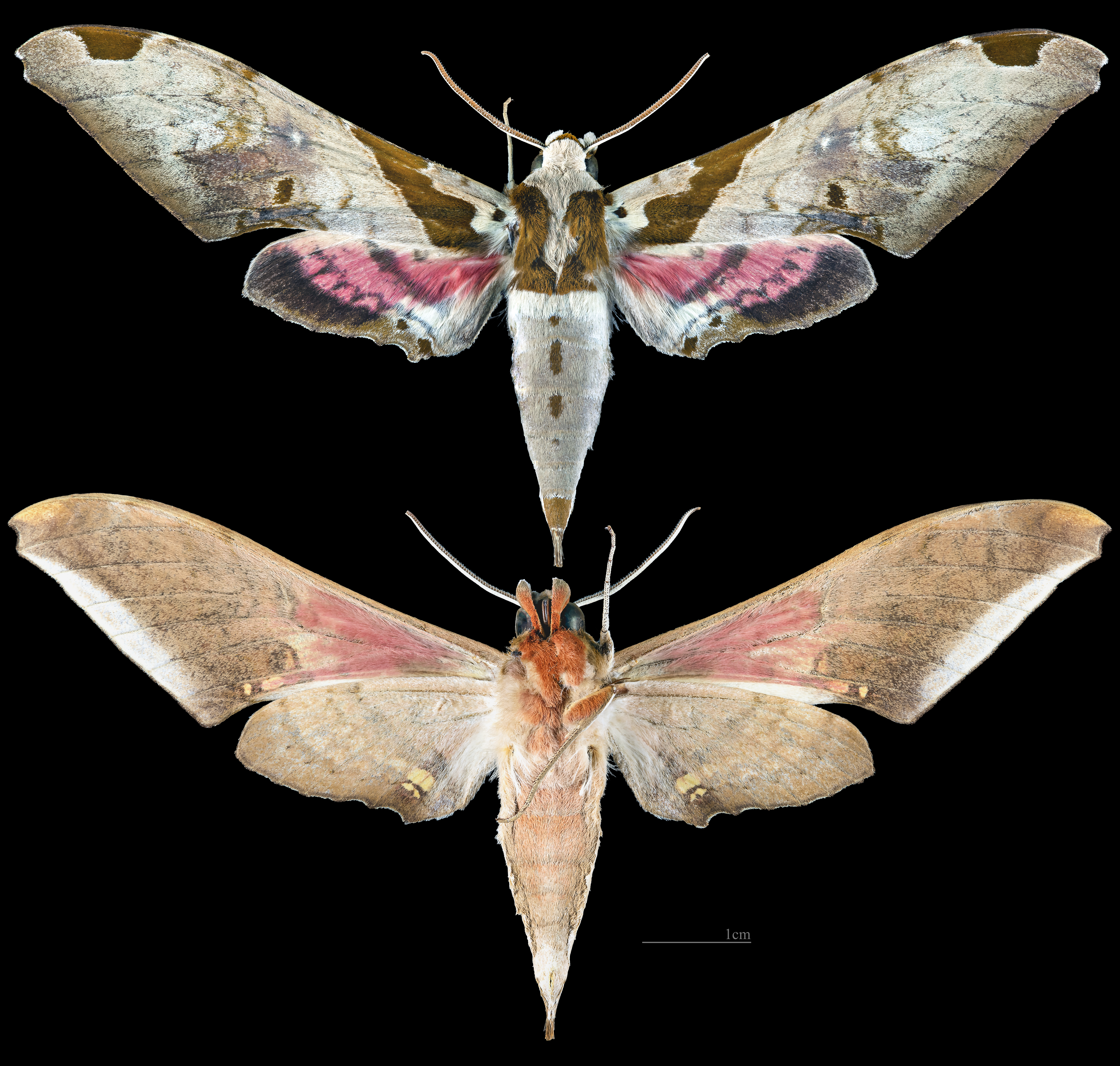
Adhemarius eurysthenes

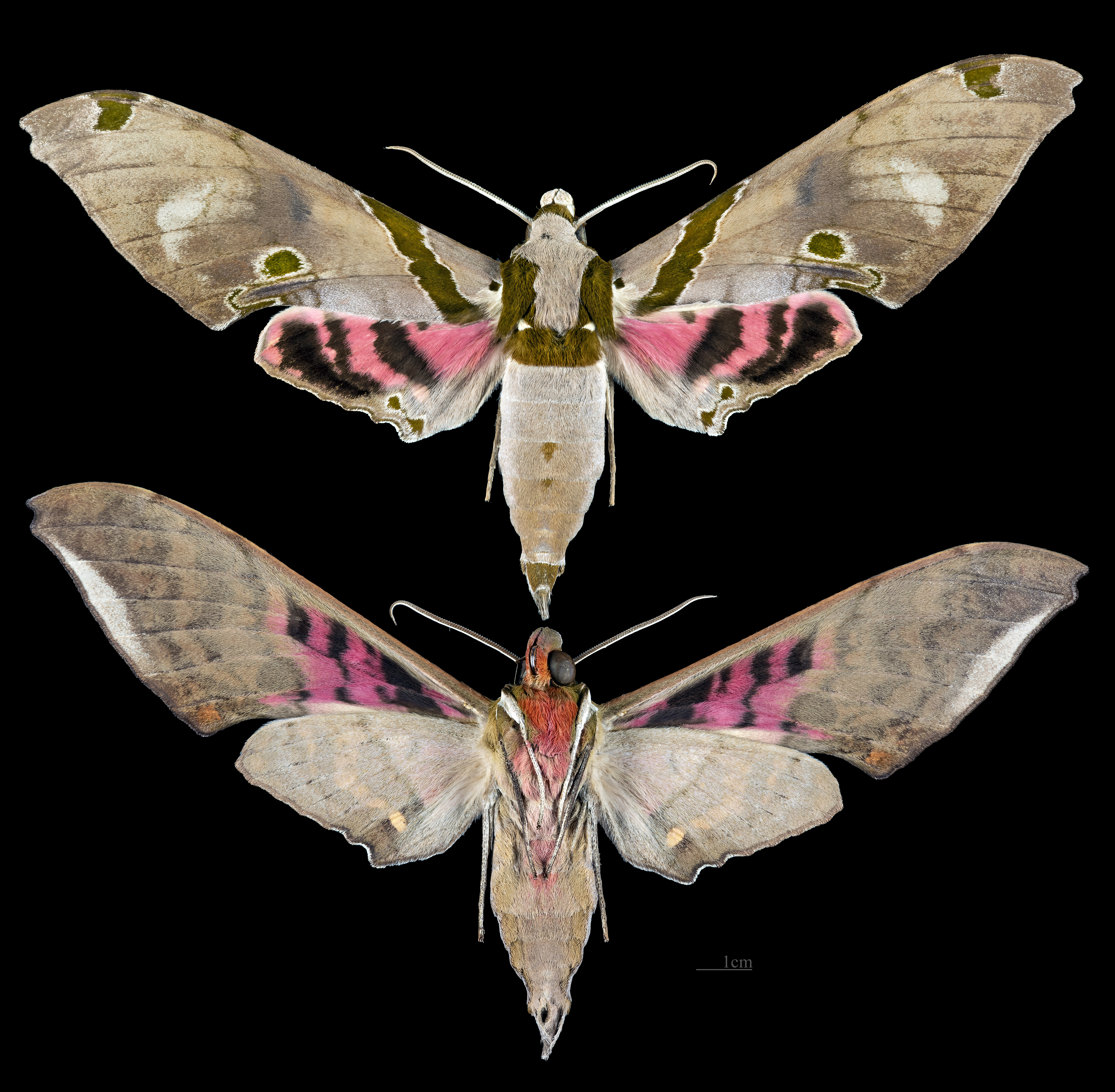
Adhemarius gagarini

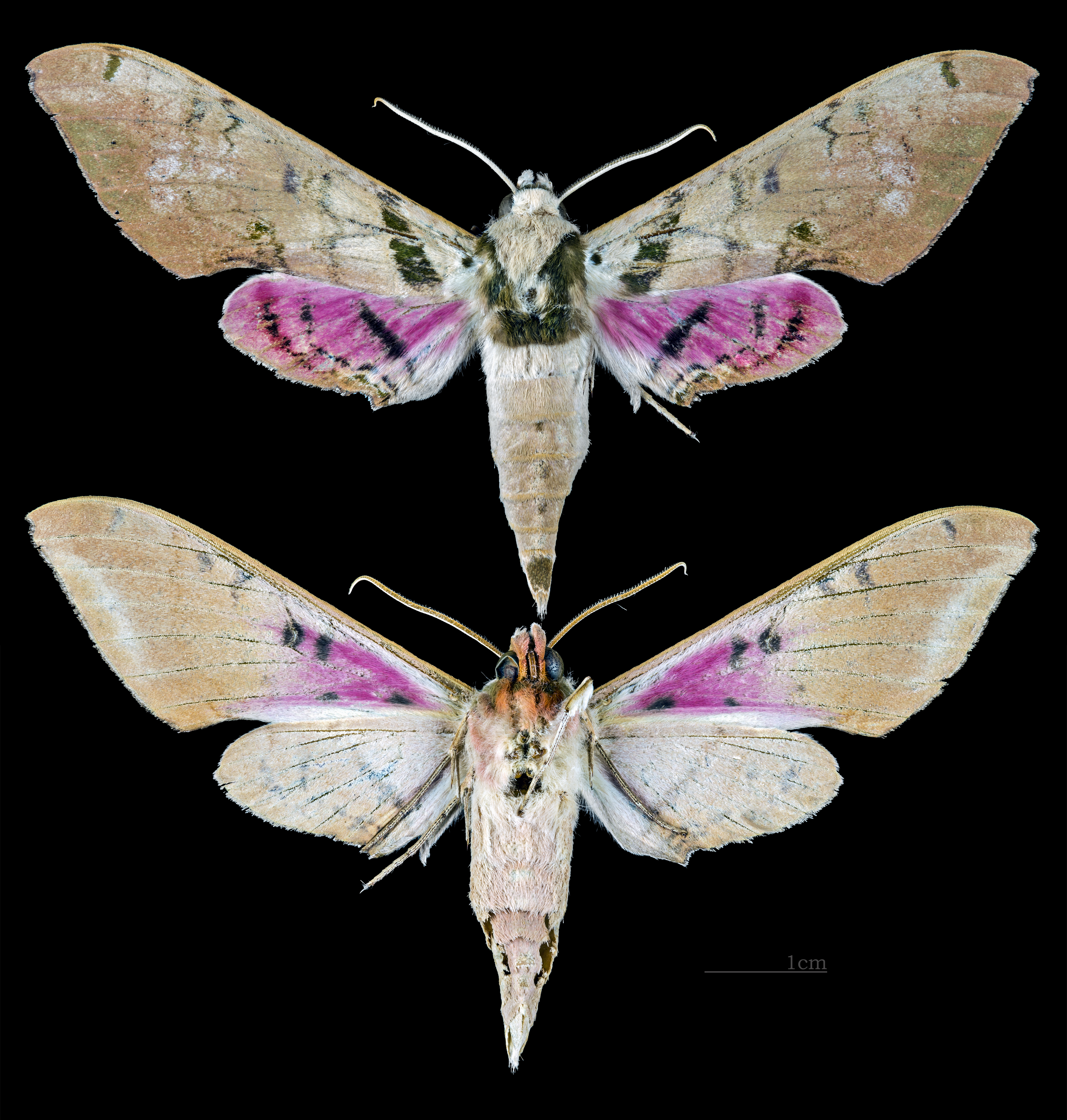
Adhemarius gannascus

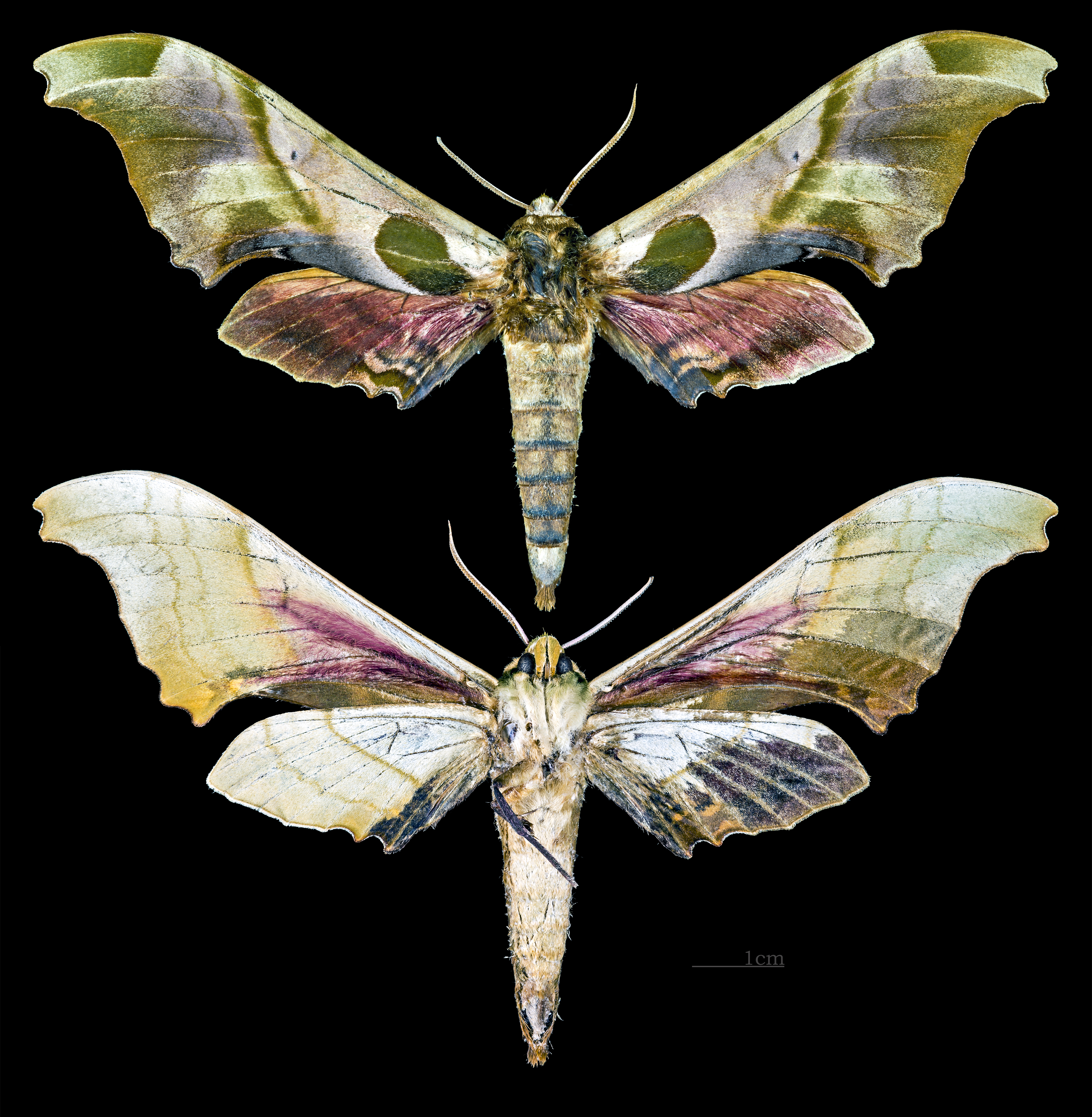
Adhemarius globifer

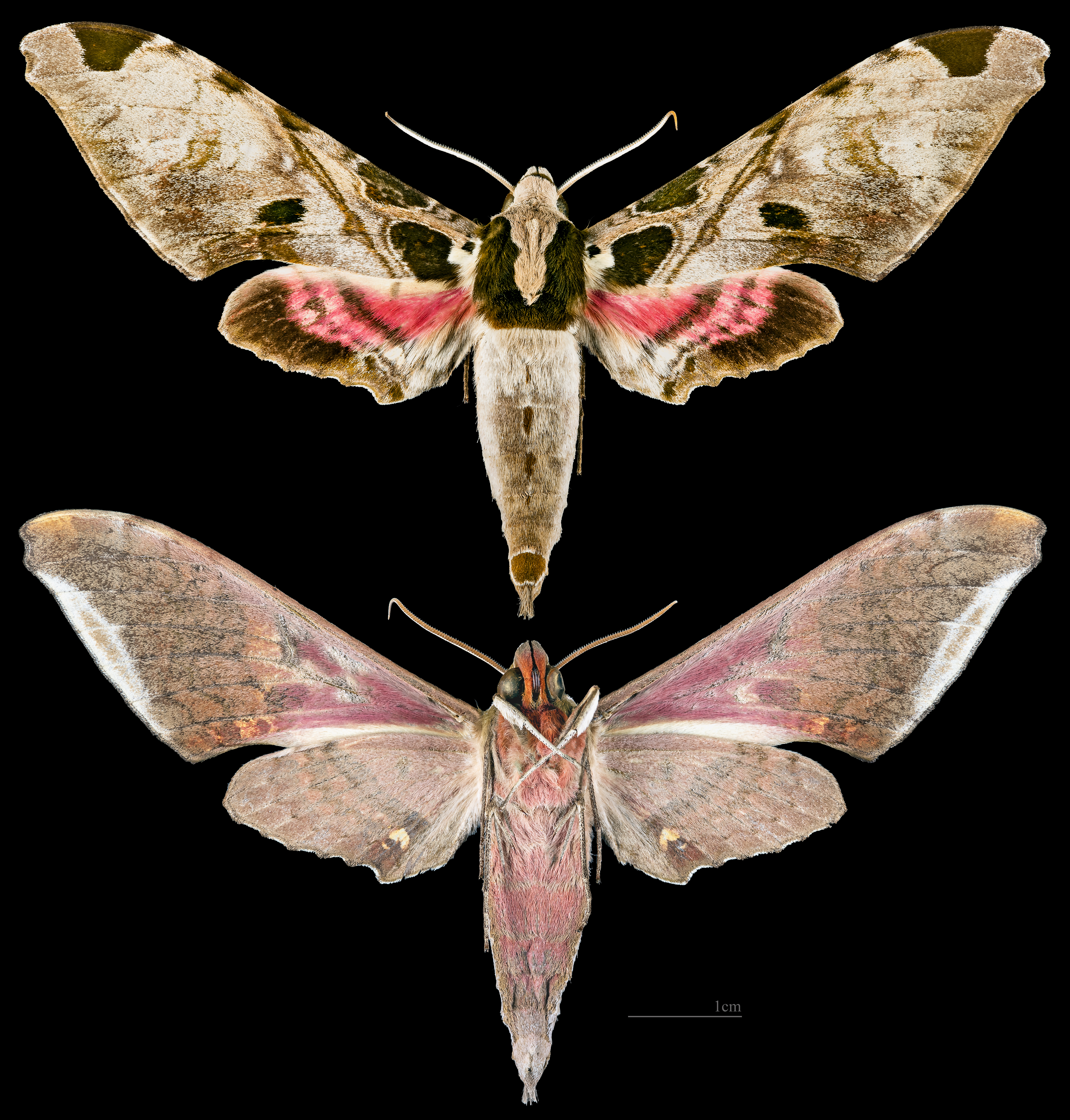
Adhemarius palmeri

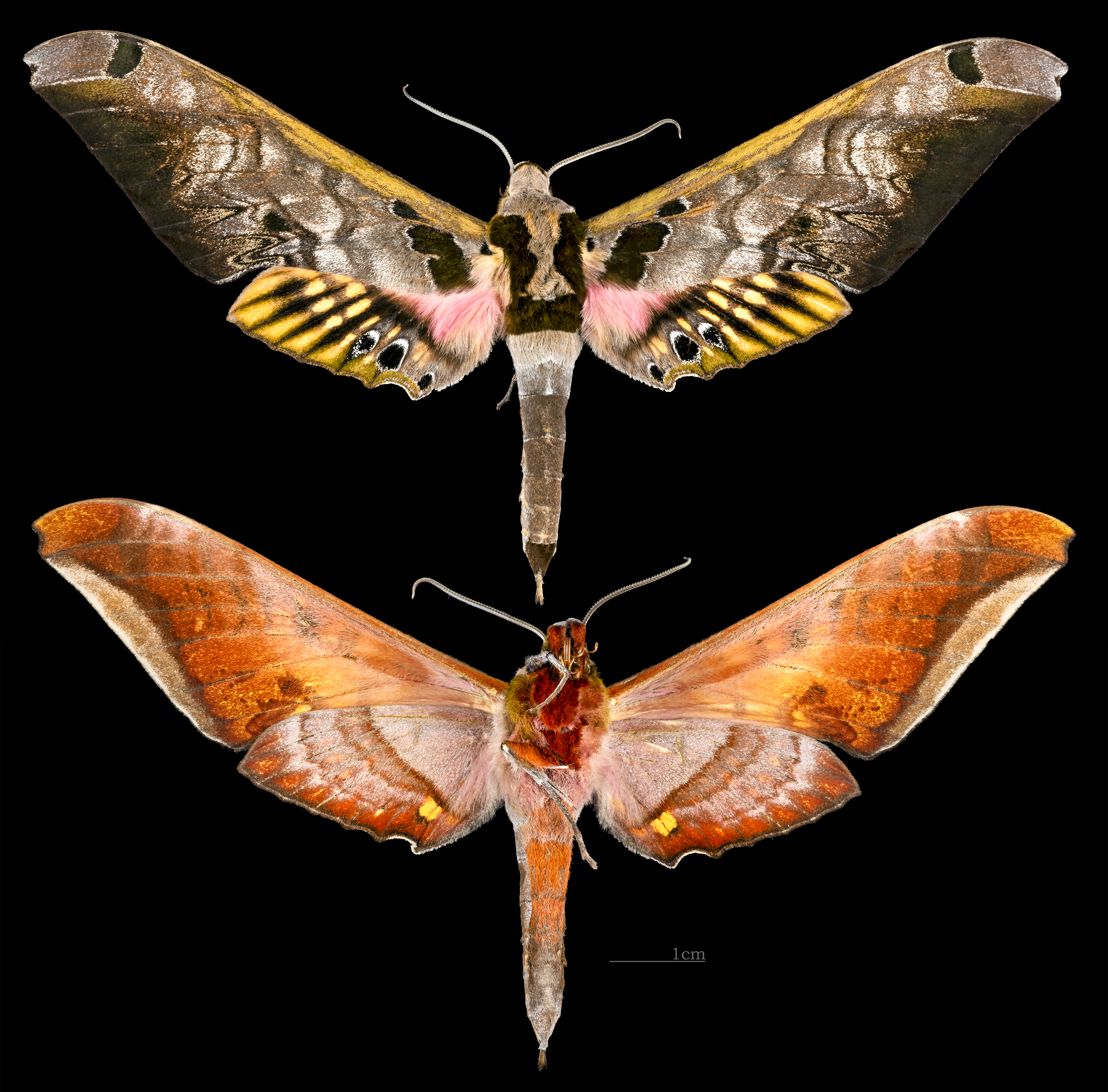
Adhemarius sexoculata

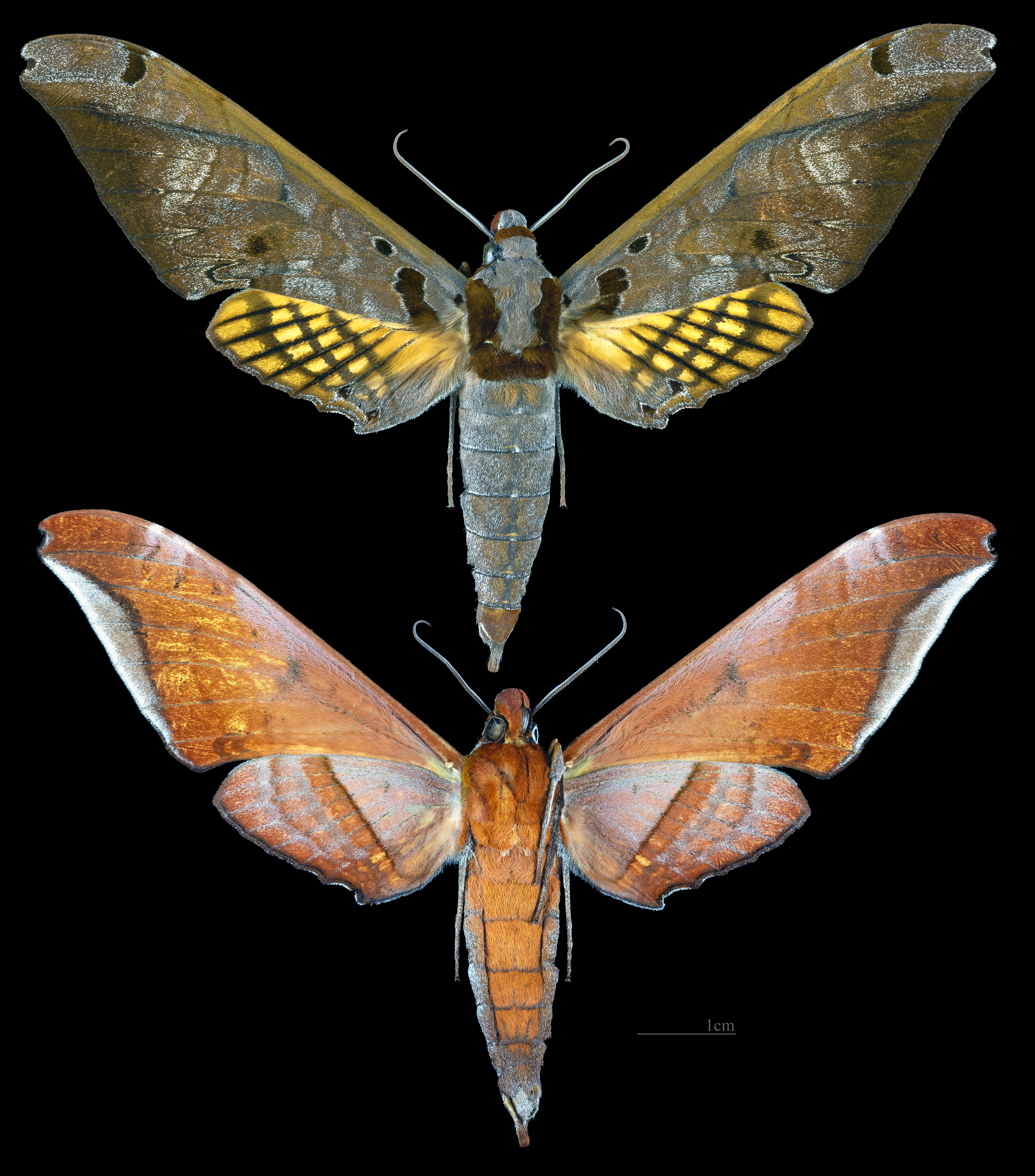
Adhemarius tigrina

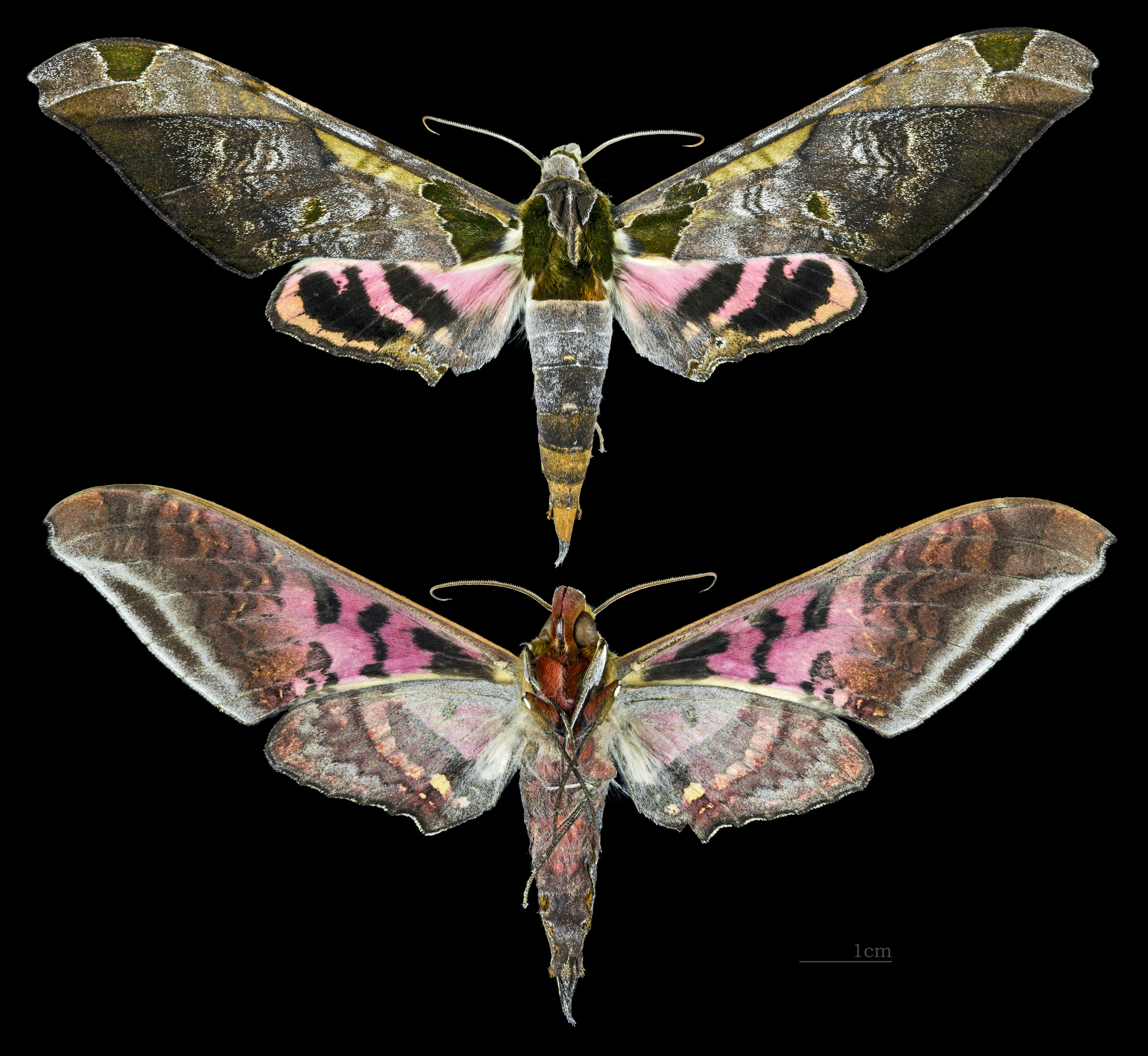
Adhemarius ypsilon
