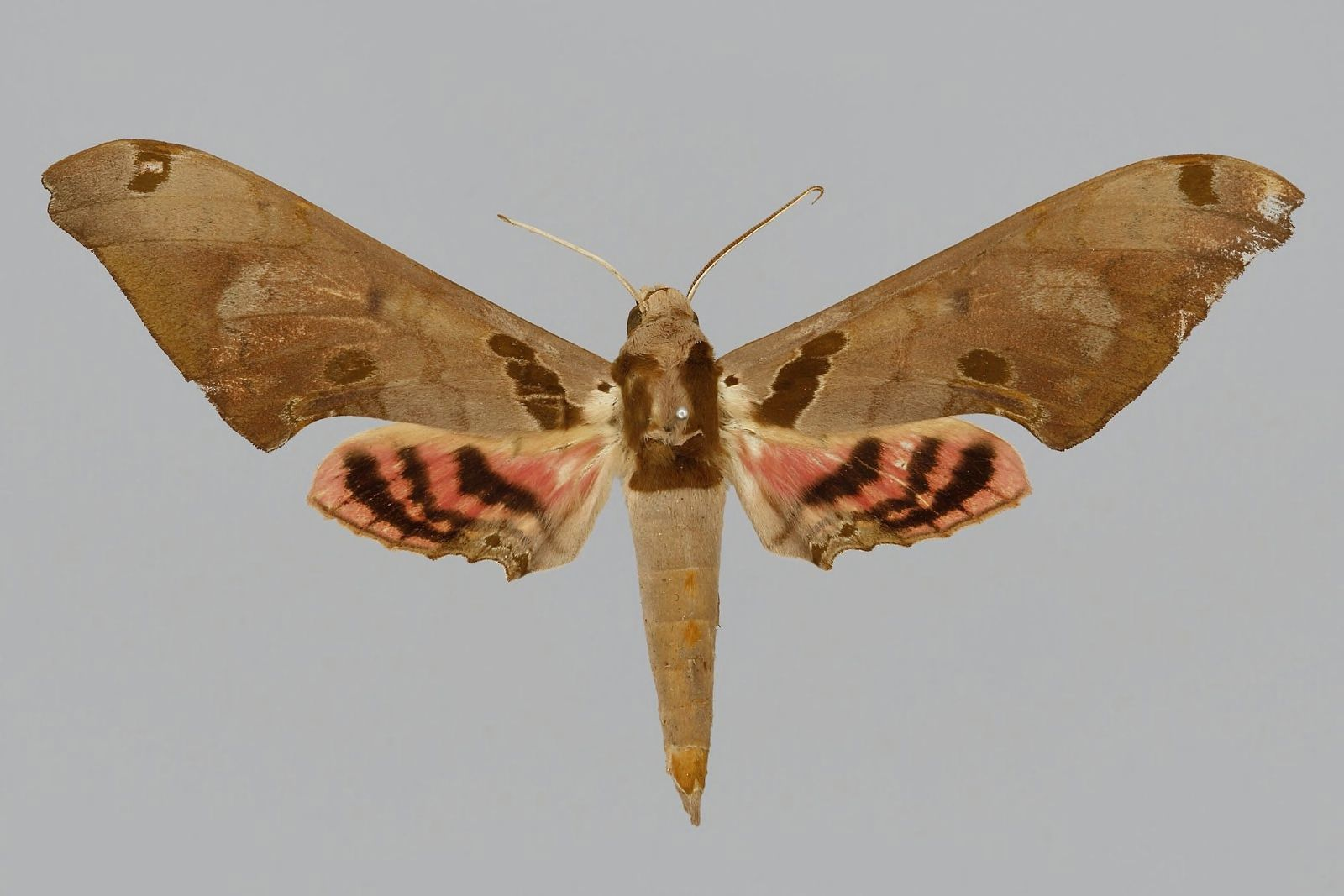
- Male, upperside
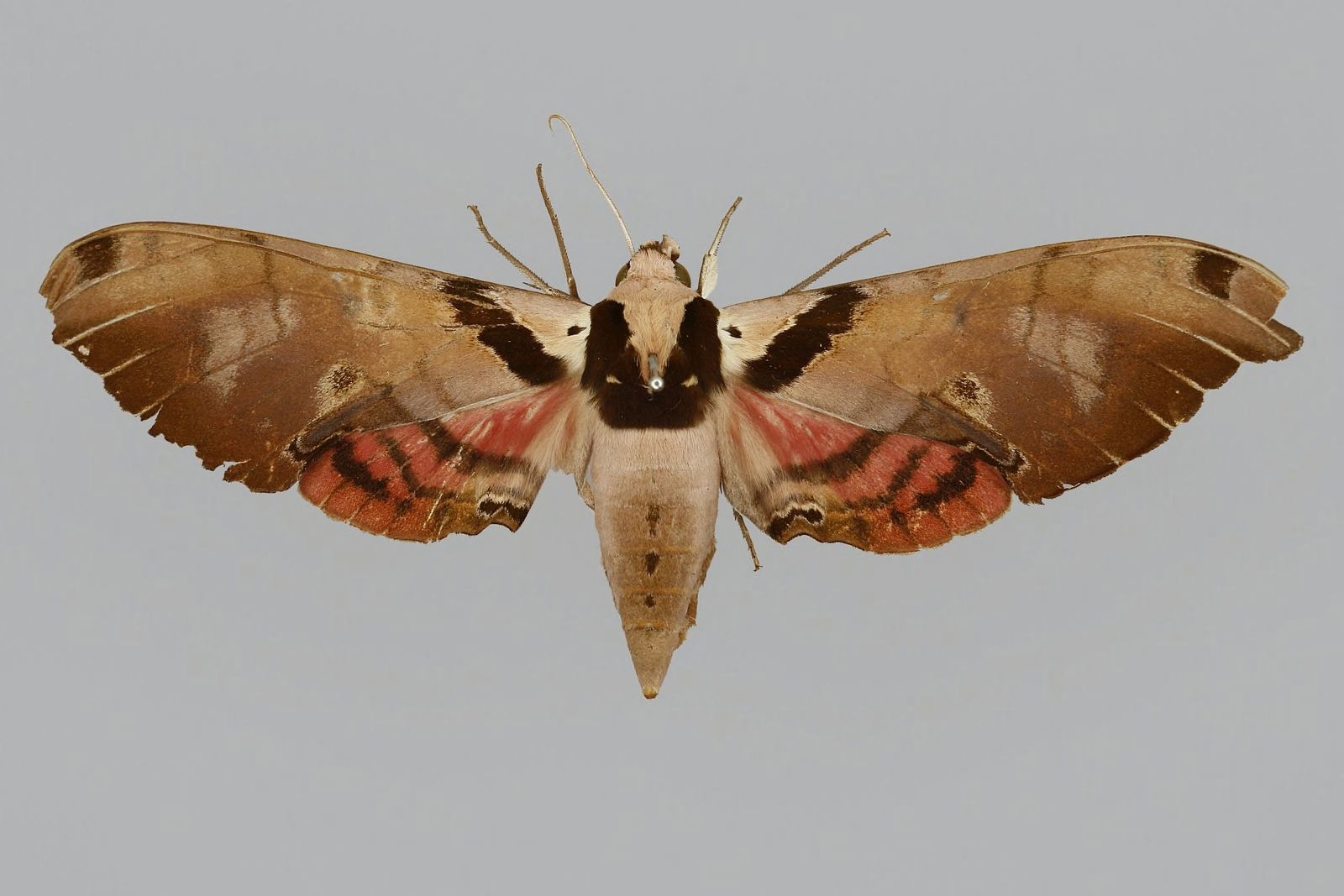
- Female, upperside

Scientific classification
- Domain: Eukaryota
- Kingdom: Animalia
- Phylum: Arthropoda
- Class: Insecta
- Order: Lepidoptera
- Family: Sphingidae
- Genus: Adhemarius
- Species: A. jamaicensis

Binomial name
- Adhemarius jamaicensis (Rothschild & Jordan, 1915)

Synonyms
- Amplypterus jamaicensis Rothschild & Jordan, 1915

= Adhemarius jamaicensis =

Species of moth

Adhemarius jamaicensis is a species of moth in the family Sphingidae. It was described by Rothschild and Jordan, in 1915, and is known from Jamaica.

Adults have been recorded in July, but there are probably at least two generations per year.
