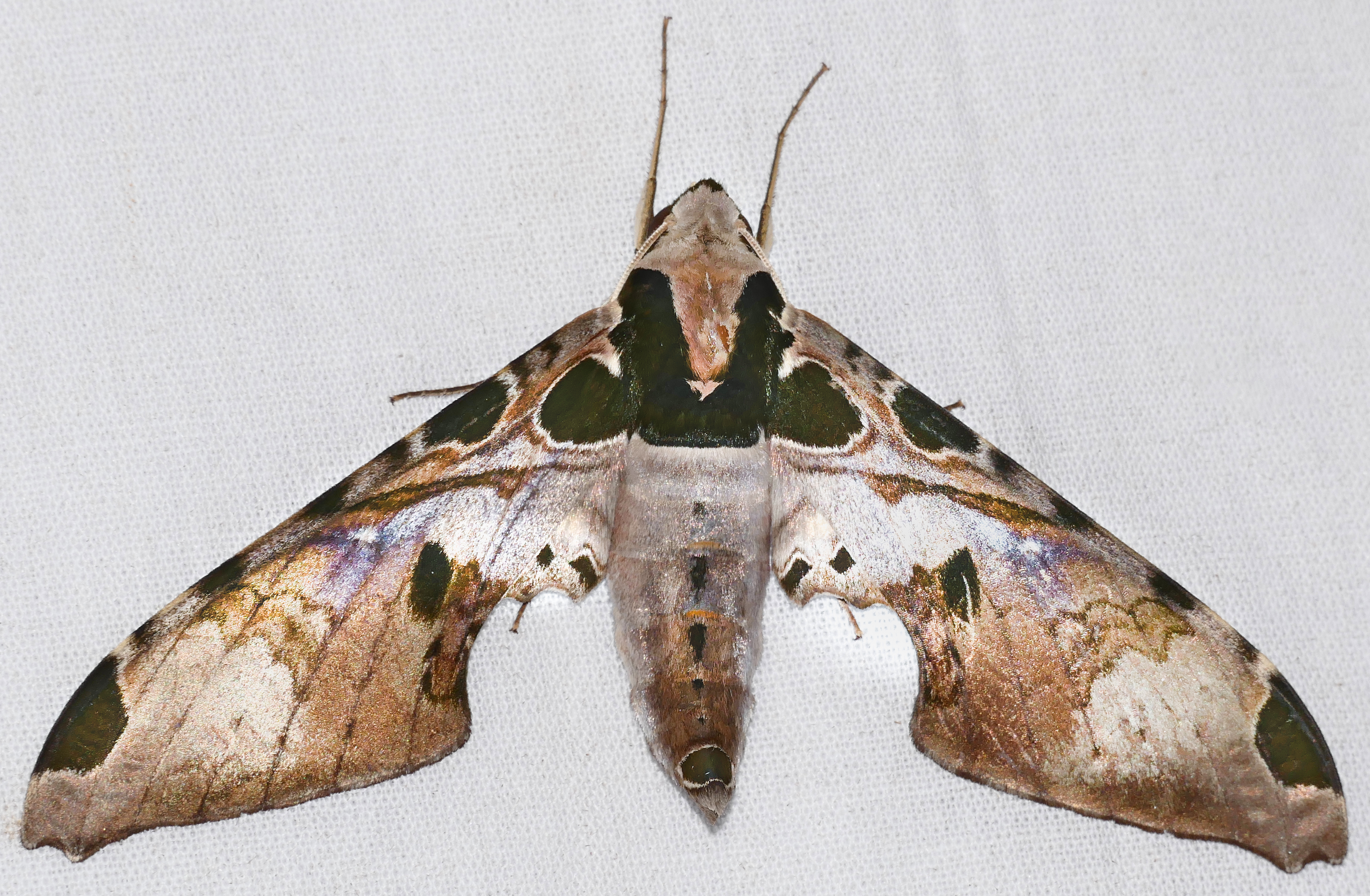

Scientific classification
- Domain: Eukaryota
- Kingdom: Animalia
- Phylum: Arthropoda
- Class: Insecta
- Order: Lepidoptera
- Family: Sphingidae
- Genus: Adhemarius
- Species: A. palmeri

Binomial name
- Adhemarius palmeri (Boisduval, [1875])

Synonyms
- Ambylux palmeri Boisduval, 1875; Amplypterus palmeri (Boisduval, [1875]); Adhemarius marginata (Butler, 1875); Adhemarius brasiliensis (Clark, 1916); Adhemarius rubricunda (Closs, 1916); Adhemarius flavellus (Gehlen, 1926); Adhemarius rubrimargo (Gehlen, 1926); Adhemarius flavus (Niepelt, 1928); Ambulyx marginata Butler, 1875; Amplypterus palmeri brasiliensis Clark, 1916; Amplypterus palmeri flavellus Gehlen, 1926; Amplypterus palmeri flavus (Niepelt, 1928); Amplypterus palmeri rubricunda (Closs, 1916); Amplypterus palmeri rubrimargo Gehlen, 1926

= Adhemarius palmeri =

Species of moth

Adhemarius palmeri is a moth of the family Sphingidae first described by Jean Baptiste Boisduval in 1875.

== Distribution ==
It is found from Costa Rica into most of South America.

== Description ==
The wingspan is 99–124 mm. The species probably broods continuously, with records indicating adults are on wing from March to July and again in October.

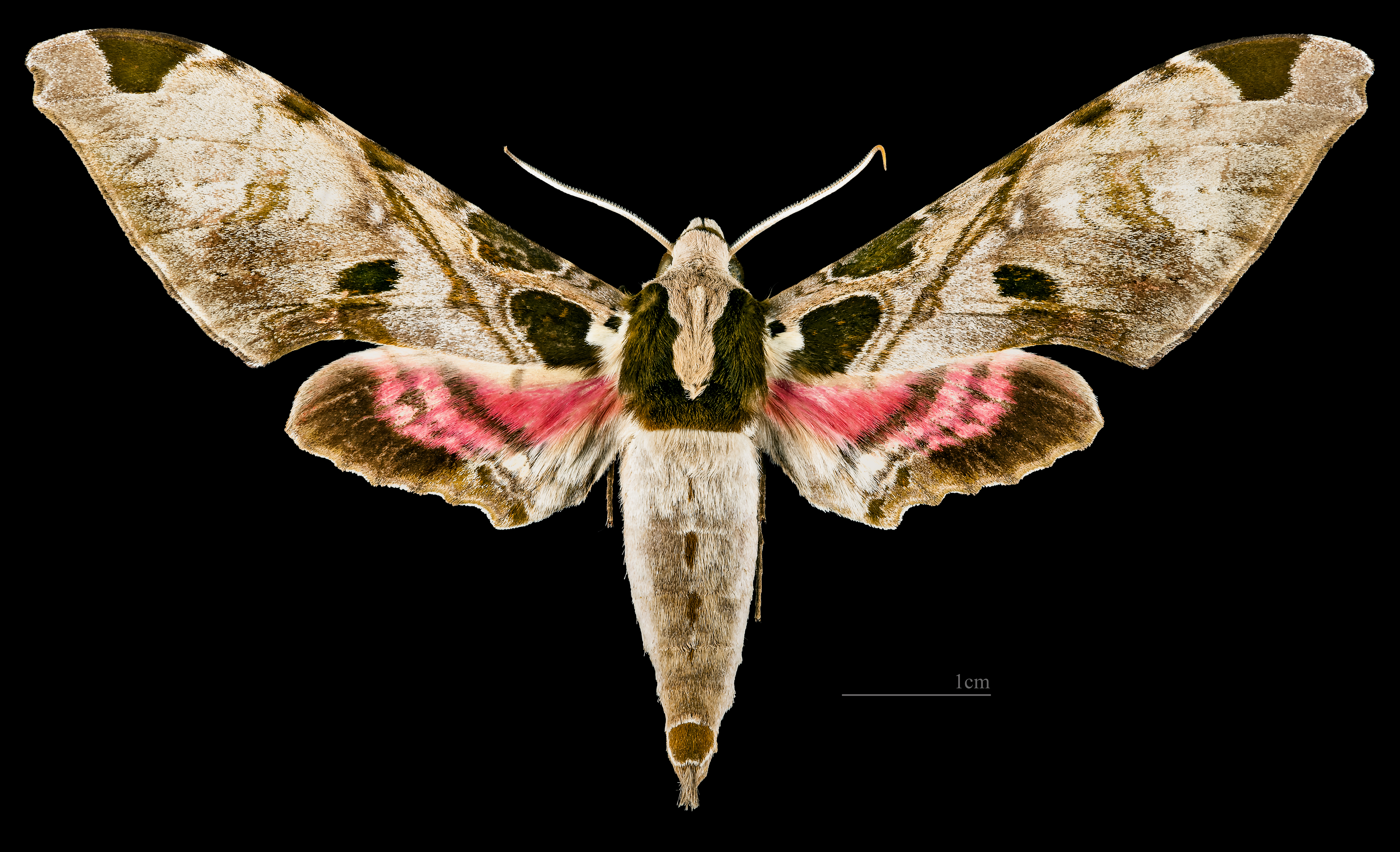
Male dorsal

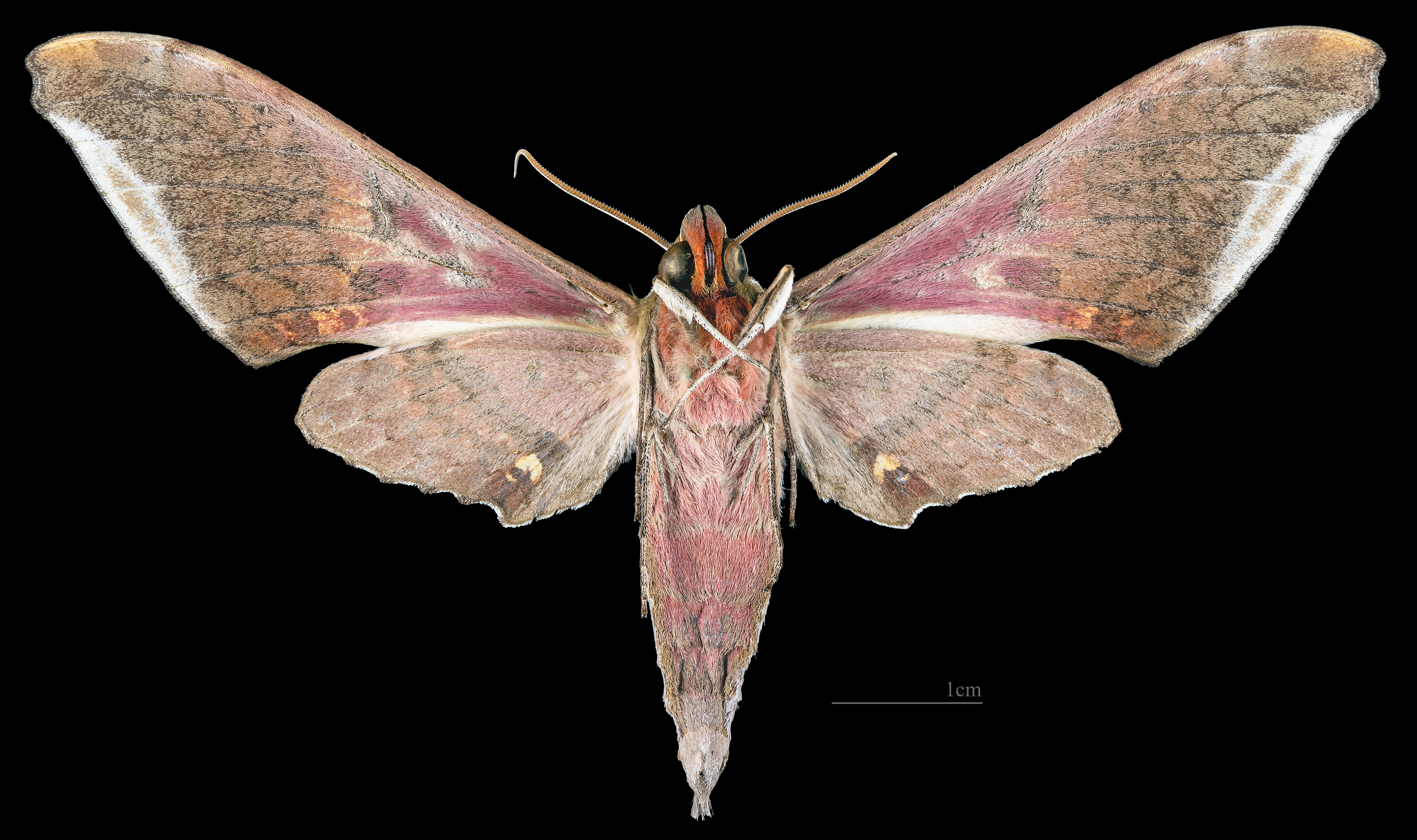
Male ventral

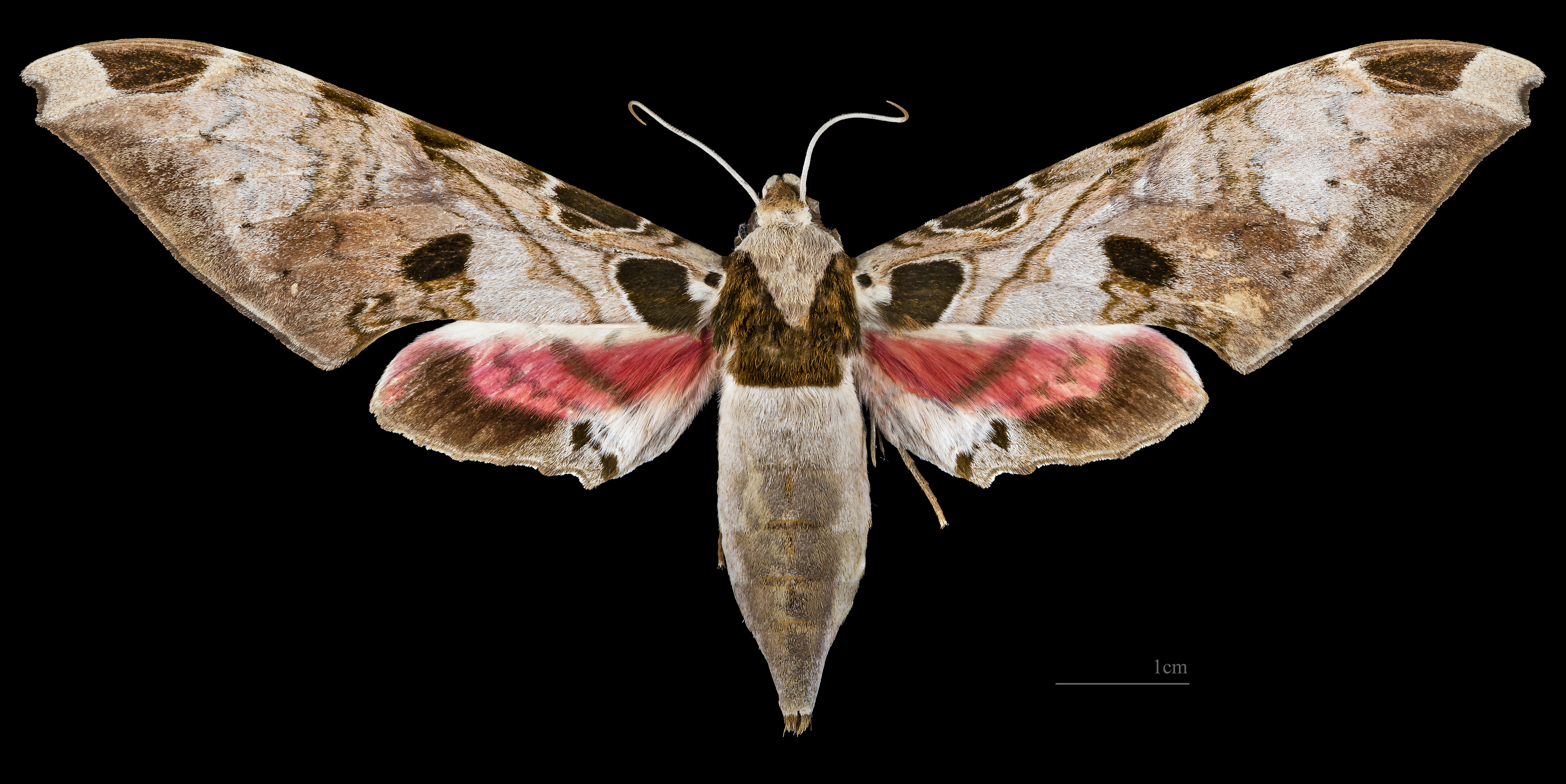
Female dorsal

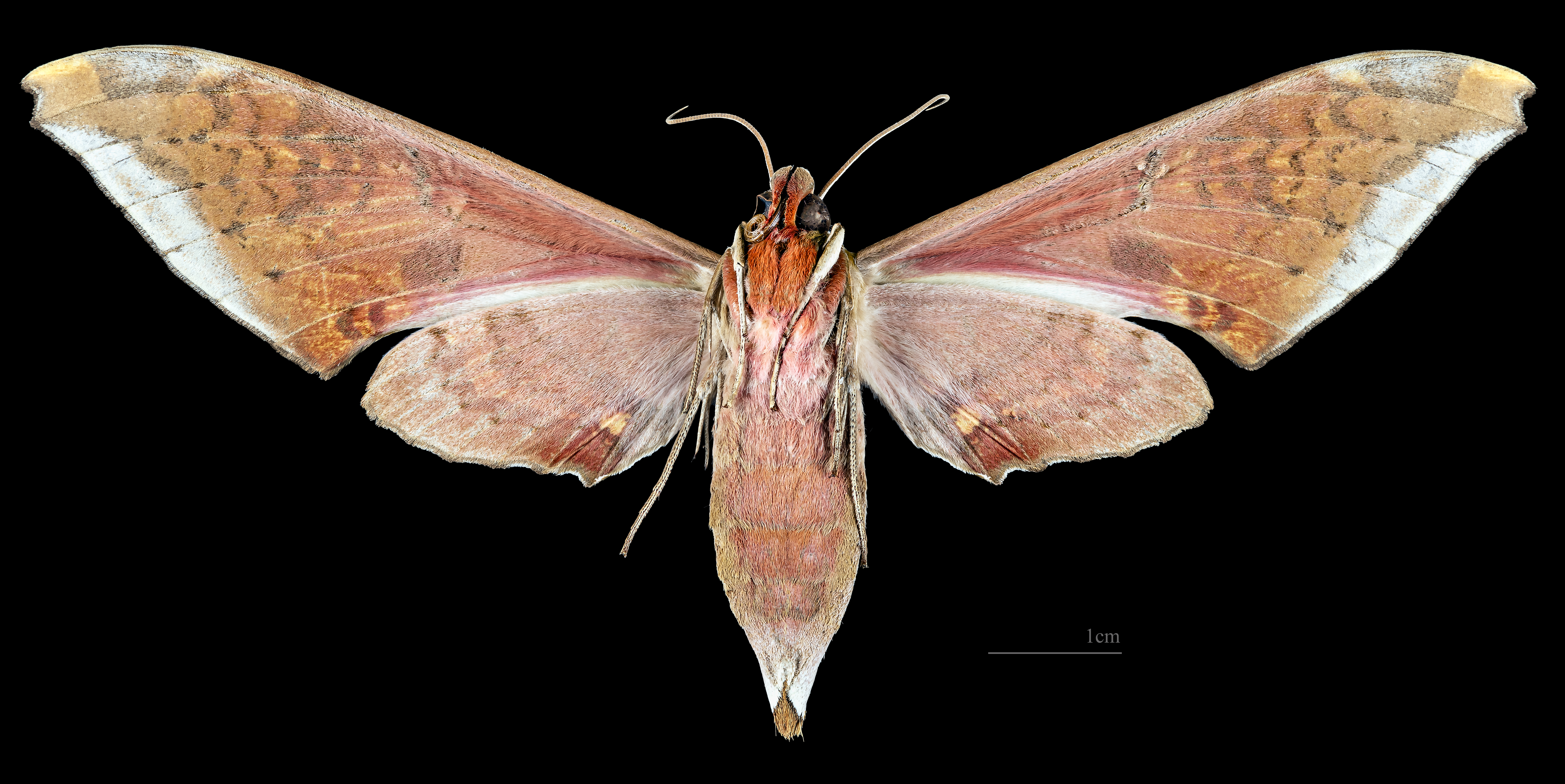
Female ventral

== Biology ==
The larvae probably feed on Ocotea veraguensis, Ocotea atirrensis and Ocotea dendrodaphne.
