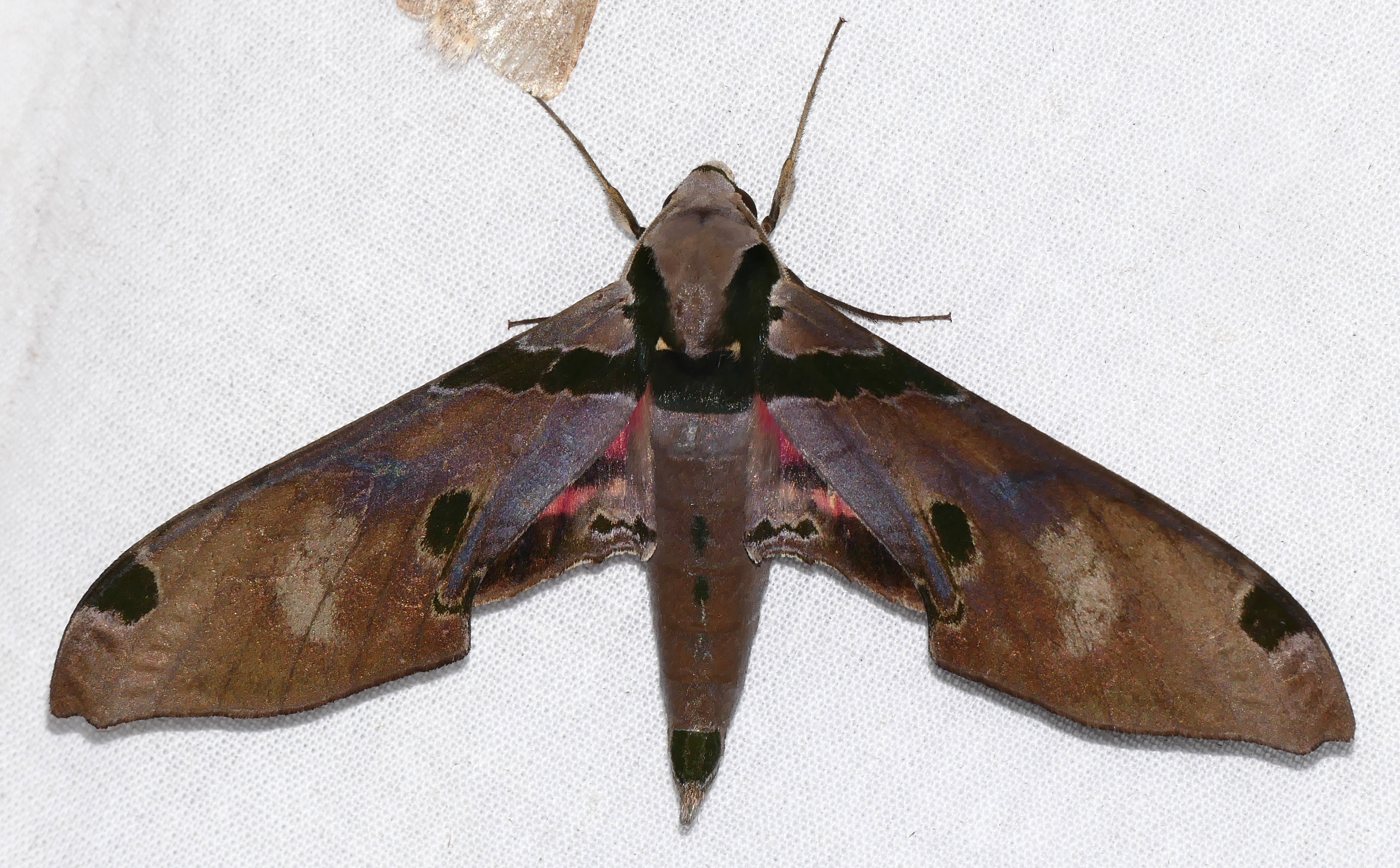

Scientific classification
- Domain: Eukaryota
- Kingdom: Animalia
- Phylum: Arthropoda
- Class: Insecta
- Order: Lepidoptera
- Family: Sphingidae
- Genus: Adhemarius
- Species: A. gagarini

Binomial name
- Adhemarius gagarini (Zikán, 1935)

Synonyms
- Amplypterus gagarini Zikán, 1935

= Adhemarius gagarini =

Species of moth

Adhemarius gagarini is a species of moth in the family Sphingidae. It was described by Jose Francisco Zikán in 1935,

== Description ==
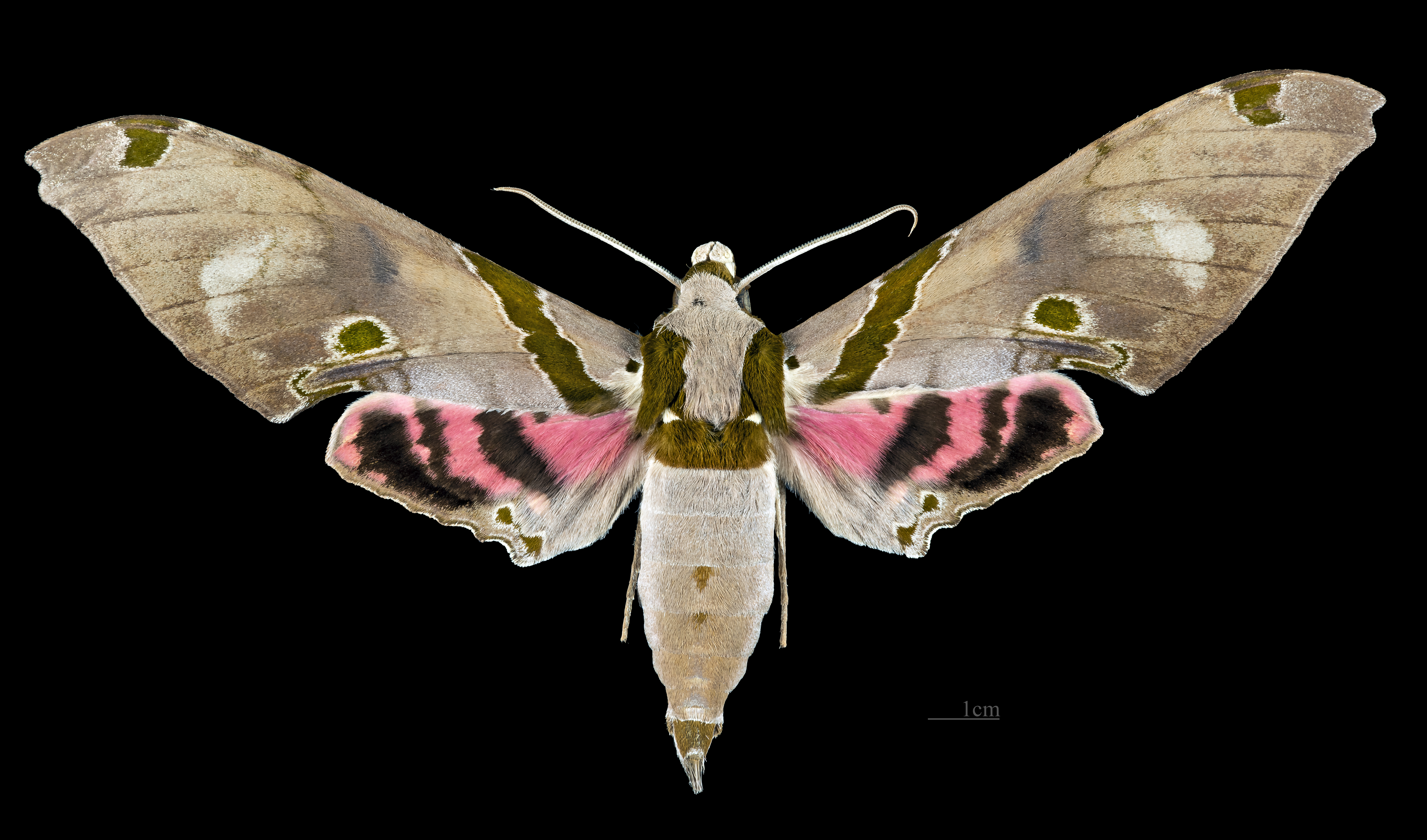
Male dorsal

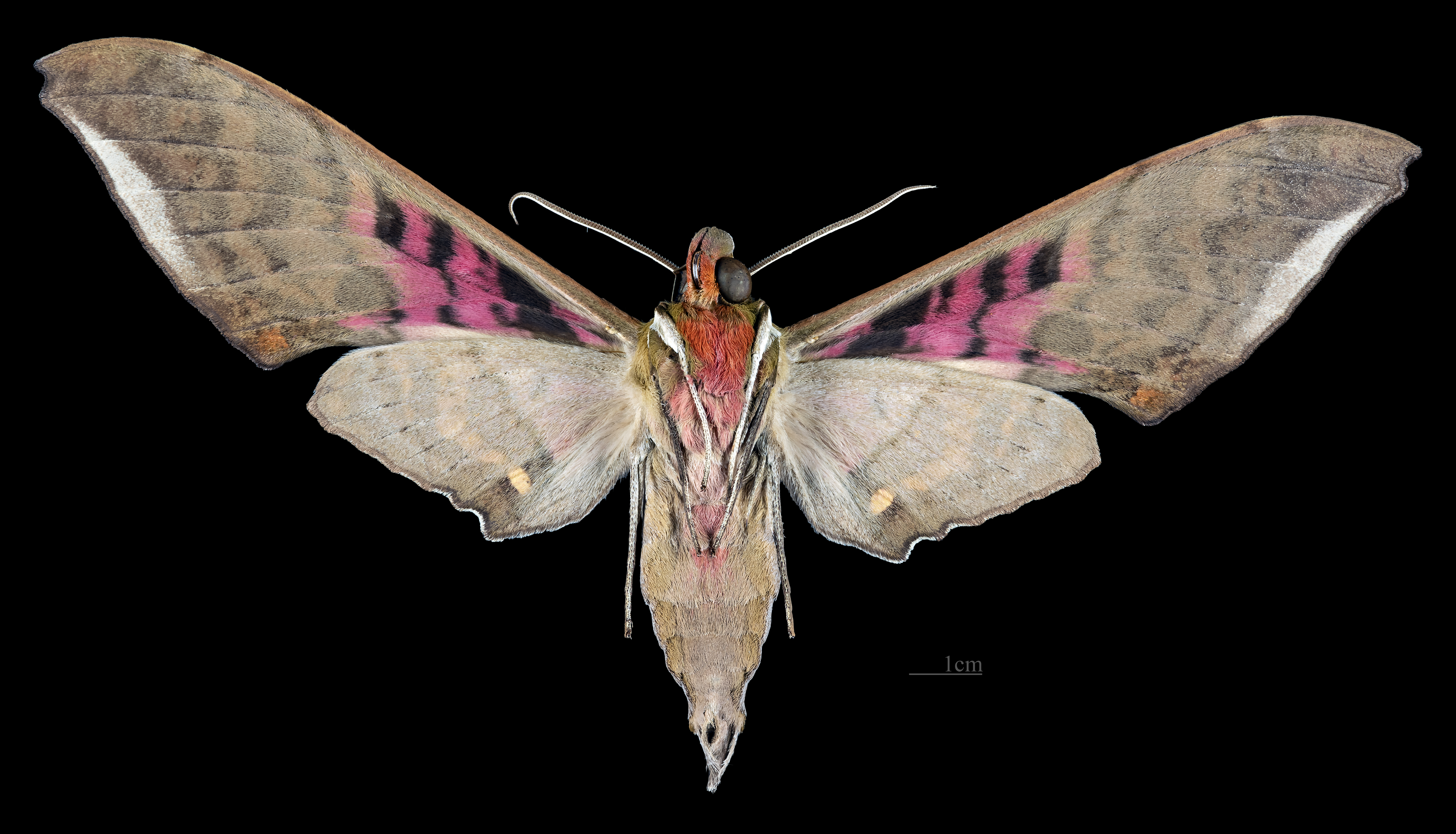
Male ventral

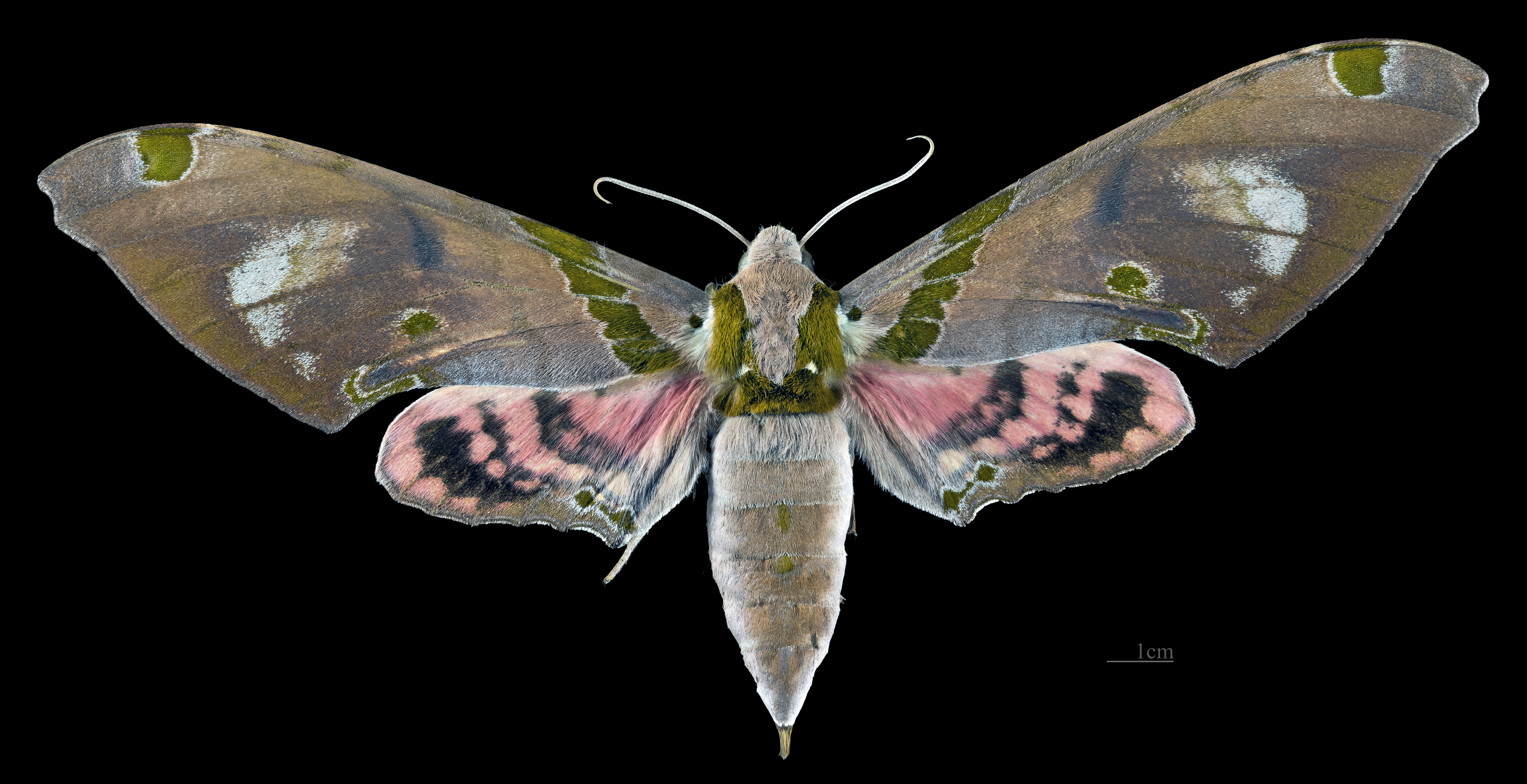
Female dorsal

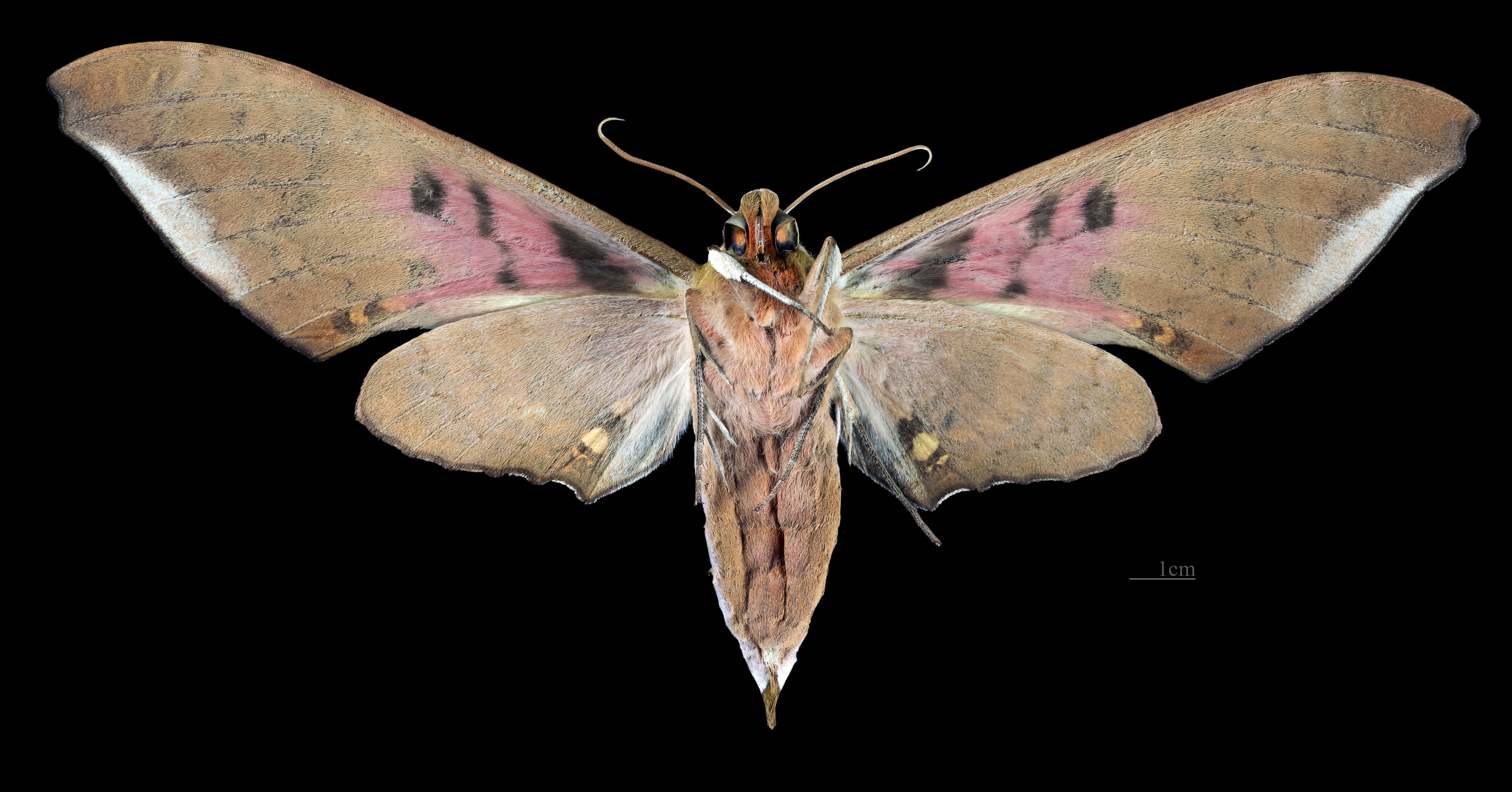
Female ventral

== Distribution ==
Is known from Brazil, Bolivia and Guyana.

== Biology ==
There are probably at least two generations per year. In Bolivia, it has been recorded in October and December.
