= List of moths of Mexico =

This is a list of moths found in Mexico:

== Geometridae ==
The Geometrid species listed here are compiled from:

- Acronyctodes bisbili
- Acronyctodes cautama
- Acronyctodes colorata
- Acronyctodes corrugata
- Acrosemia tigrata
- Acrosemia undilinea
- Acrosemia vulpecularia
- Acrotomia mucia
- Acrotomia viminaria
- Acrotomodes nr. chiriquensis
- Anavinemina indistincta
- Anisoperas lurida
- Anisoperas tessellata
- Antepione thisoaria
- Aplogompha argentilinea
- Aplogompha chotaria
- Argyrotome alba
- Argyrotome mexicaria
- Asestra cabiria
- Bagodares prosa
- Bassania amethystata
- Bassania crocallinaria
- Besma mattearia
- Besma undularia
- Bonatea duciata
- Caripeta hyperythrata
- Cepphis megamede
- Cimicodes albicosta
- Cirsodes acuminata
- Costalobata allidaria
- Costalobata picturata
- Cratoptera primularia
- Cratoptera zarumata
- Destutia modica
- Epimecis conjugaria
- Epimecis puellaria
- Epimecis subroraria
- Erastria decrepitaria ssp. decrepitaria
- Erosina hyberniata
- Euclysia angustitincta
- Euclysia dentifasciata
- Eusarca asteria
- Eusarca crameraria
- Eusarca flexilis
- Eusarca fundaria
- Eusarca mera
- Eusarca minucia
- Eusarca nemora ssp. nemora
- Eusarca orsima
- Eutomopepla artena
- Eutomopepla vorda
- Frederickia nigricomma
- Galenara bispicula
- Glena agria
- Glena effusa
- Herbita amicaria
- Herbita cyclopeata
- Herbita medona
- Herbita nr. medama
- Herbita praeditaria
- Herbita tenebrica
- Himeromima aulis
- Hyalostenele lutescens
- Hydatoscia ategua ssp. ategua
- Hygrochroma bubona
- Hygrochroma nondina
- Hygrochroma olivinaria
- Hymenomima camerata
- Hymenomima memor
- Hymenomima umbelaria
- Hypomecis laeca
- Ira nr. somnolenta
- Iridopsis aglauros
- Iridopsis herse
- Iridopsis lurida
- Iridopsis validaria
- Ischnopteris bifinita
- Isochromodes cf. jodea
- Isochromodes nr. granula
- Lambdina cf. axion
- Leuciris fimbraria
- Leucula lucidaria
- Leucula meganira
- Leuculopsis intermedia
- Lobopola cimarrona
- Lomographa candida
- Macaria abydata
- Macaria cardinea
- Macaria festivata
- Macaria gambarina
- Macaria imitata
- Macaria nundinata
- Macaria subfulva
- Macaria triplicaria
- Melanchroia chephise
- Melanolophia bostar
- Melinodes detersaria
- Melinodes iobarris
- Mericisca gracea
- Metanema bonadea
- Microgonia perfulvata
- Microgonia rhodaria
- Microxydia nr. ruficomma
- Nematocampa arenosa
- Nematocampa completa
- Nematocampa reticulata
- Neoselenia banasa
- Neoselenia narcaea
- Neotherina imperilla
- Nepheloleuca politia ssp. iliturata
- Nepheloleuca politia ssp. politia
- Nephodia organa
- Nephodia plautilla
- Nesalcis haematosticta
- Opisthoxia amabilis
- Opisthoxia asopis
- Opisthoxia bella
- Opisthoxia cf. bolivari
- Opisthoxia cassandra
- Opisthoxia formosante
- Opisthoxia miletia
- Opisthoxia molpadia
- Opisthoxia salubaea
- Opisthoxia uncinata
- Opisthoxia vitenaria
- Oxydia geminata ssp. geminata
- Oxydia gueneei
- Oxydia masthala
- Oxydia mexicata
- Oxydia nimbata
- Oxydia nr. obtusaria
- Oxydia platypterata
- Oxydia vesulia
- Pantherodes unciaria
- Paragonia cruraria
- Paragonia procidaria
- Paragonia tasima ssp. tasima
- Parallage nr. inconcinna
- Paraphoides largifica
- Parilexia nicetaria
- Parilexia proditata
- Patalene aenetusaria
- Patalene asychisaria
- Patalene falcularia
- Patalene hamulata
- Patalene moneta
- Patalene trogonaria
- Periclina apricaria
- Periclina merana
- Periclina syctaria
- Perissopteryx gamezi
- Perissopteryx griseobarbipes
- Pero afuera
- Pero amanda
- Pero astapa
- Pero asterodia
- Pero bulba
- Pero caerula
- Pero chapela
- Pero clysiaria
- Pero curuma
- Pero delauta
- Pero derecha
- Pero dularia
- Pero exquisita
- Pero externa
- Pero fragila
- Pero heralda
- Pero lessema
- Pero melissa
- Pero mnasilaria
- Pero nigra
- Pero plagodiata
- Pero polygonaria
- Pero rumina
- Pero saturata
- Pero registrada
- Pero verda
- Phaeoura spadix
- Phrygionis platinata ssp. naevia
- Phrygionis polita
- Phrygionis privignaria
- Phyle aspilotos
- Phyle schausaria
- Phyllodonta druciata
- Phyllodonta esperanza
- Phyllodonta flabellaria
- Phyllodonta indeterminata
- Physocleora vacillaria
- Pityeja histrionaria
- Pityeja nazada
- Polla hemeraria
- Prochoerodes pilosa
- Prochoerodes tetragonata
- Puebla aztecaria
- Rhomboptila nr. cajanuma
- Rindgeria picta
- Sabulodes cf. arge
- Sabulodes exhonorata
- Sabulodes loba
- Sabulodes nr. matrica
- Sabulodes plauta
- Sabulodes setosa
- Sabulodes solola
- Sabulodes striata
- Selenia mariaria
- Semiothisa divergentata
- Semiothisa salsa
- Sericoptera mahometaria
- Sicya cf. inquinata
- Sicya cf. pomona
- Simena luctifera
- Simena schusteri
- Simena umbrifera
- Simopteryx torquataria
- Sphacelodes quadrilineata
- Sphacelodes vulneraria
- Synnomos firmamentaria
- Thyrinteina arnobia
- Thysanopyga abdominaria
- Thysanopyga casperia
- "Thysanopyga" fractimacula
- Tmetomorpha bitias
- Tornos brutus
- Trotopera arrhapa
- Urepione quadrilineata

== Tortricidae ==
The leafroller moth species listed here are compiled from:

- Aethes tuxtlana
- Amorbia cuneana
- Argyrotaenia montezumae
- Eupinivora parotanus
- Mimcochylis planola
- Monoceratuncus (genus)
- Nycthia pimana
- Nycthia yuccatana
- Platynota rostrana
- Pogospinia veracruzensis

== Other Families ==
- Acalyptris paradividua
- Acalyptris terrificus
- Acalyptris yucatani
- Acanthodica daunus
- Acanthodica grandis
- Accinctapubes apicalis
- Acleris potosiana
- Acleris retrusa
- Acleris zimmermani
- Acontia areletta
- Acrocercops demotes
- Acrocercops gemmans
- Acrocercops marmaritis
- Actias truncatipennis
- Adhemarius donysa
- Adhemarius gannascus
- Adhemarius mexicanus
- Adhemarius ypsilon
- Adoxobotys cacidus
- Adoxobotys cristobalis
- Adoxobotys discordalis
- Aerotypia
- Aethes ignobilis
- Aethes tuxtlana
- Aethesoides allodapa
- Aethesoides inanita
- Aethesoides mexicana
- Aethesoides timia
- Agaraea emendatus
- Agylla nubens
- Agylla perpensa
- Aleptina clinopetes
- Allanwatsonia
- Alpheias baccalis
- Alpheias conspirata
- Alpheias gitonalis
- Alucita flavicincta
- Alucita nasuta
- Amaxia fallaciosa
- Amaxia juvenis
- Amorbia chiapas
- Amorbia cordobana
- Amorbia eccopta
- Amorbia monteverde
- Amorbia potosiana
- Amorbia stenovalvae
- Amorbimorpha powelliana
- Amorbimorpha schausiana
- Amorbimorpha spadicea
- Anacampsis cenelpis
- Anacampsis conistica
- Anacampsis quinquepunctella
- Anacampsis rhabdodes
- Anacampsis tridentella
- Anacampsis ursula
- Anania antigastridia
- Anania caudatella
- Anania federalis
- Anania intinctalis
- Anarnatula sylea
- Anaxita tricoloriceps
- Anoncia crossi
- Anopina albomaculana
- Anopina albominima
- Anopina apicalis
- Anopina asaphes
- Anopina asuturana
- Anopina bifurcatana
- Anopina bloomfieldana
- Anopina bonagotoides
- Anopina chelatana
- Anopina chemsaki
- Anopina chipinquensis
- Anopina circumtila
- Anopina condata
- Anopina confusa
- Anopina dentata
- Anopina desmatana
- Anopina durangoensis
- Anopina glossana
- Anopina gnathodentana
- Anopina griseana
- Anopina guerrerana
- Anopina hermana
- Anopina impotana
- Anopina incana
- Anopina iturbidensis
- Anopina macrospinana
- Anopina manantlana
- Anopina metlec
- Anopina minas
- Anopina parasema
- Anopina perplexa
- Anopina phaeopina
- Anopina pinana
- Anopina potosiensis
- Anopina praecisana
- Anopina psaeroptera
- Anopina pseudominas
- Anopina pseudotilia
- Anopina quadritiliana
- Anopina revolcaderos
- Anopina rusiasana
- Anopina sacculapinana
- Anopina scintillans
- Anopina soltera
- Anopina transtiliana
- Anopina undata
- Anopina unicana
- Anopina volcana
- Anopina wellingi
- Anopina xicotepeca
- Anopina yecorana
- Anopina yolox
- Anstenoptilia marmarodactyla
- Antaeotricha admixta
- Antaeotricha ammodes
- Antaeotricha caprimulga
- Antaeotricha ceratistes
- Antaeotricha comosa
- Antaeotricha cryeropis
- Antaeotricha demotica
- Antaeotricha discolor
- Antaeotricha elaeodes
- Antaeotricha ergates
- Antaeotricha forreri
- Antaeotricha fractilinea
- Antaeotricha frontalis
- Antaeotricha fumifica
- Antaeotricha hemibathra
- Antaeotricha incompleta
- Antaeotricha isosticta
- Antaeotricha machetes
- Antaeotricha ribbei
- Antaeotricha zelotes
- Antepione tiselaaria
- Anycles cupreus
- Apeplopoda ochracea
- Apilocrocis pseudocephalis
- Apilocrocis yucatanalis
- Apistosia tenebrosa
- Apocera zographica
- Apolychrosis ambogonium
- Apolychrosis candidus
- Apolychrosis ferruginus
- Apolychrosis synchysis
- Aponia aponianalis
- Aponia itzalis
- Apotoforma ptygma
- Aptunga macropasa
- Arachnis martina
- Arachnis mishma
- Arachnis tristis
- Argyractoides gontranalis
- Argyractoides rinconadalis
- Argyria supposita
- Argyrotaenia bialbistriata
- Argyrotaenia chiapasi
- Argyrotaenia confinis
- Argyrotaenia cupreographa
- Argyrotaenia glabra
- Argyrotaenia montezumae
- Argyrotaenia octavana
- Argyrotaenia parturita
- Argyrotaenia polvosana
- Argyrotaenia ponera
- Argyrotaenia potosiana
- Argyrotaenia spinacallis
- Argyrotaenia unda
- Argyrotaenia urbana
- Arispe concretalis
- Arispe ovalis
- Aristotelia dasypoda
- Aristotelia hieroglyphica
- Aristotelia pantalaena
- Aristotelia pyrodercia
- Aristotelia squamigera
- Arogalea albilingua
- Arogalea archaea
- Arogalea senecta
- Ategumia dilecticolor
- Atepa cordobana
- Atepa sinaloana
- Atepa triplagata
- Aulacodes citronalis
- Auratonota effera
- Auratonota oxytenia
- Auratonota serotina
- Auratonota spinivalva
- Autochloris patagiata
- Batrachedra knabi
- Batrachedra linaria
- Batrachedra theca
- Bonagota chiapasana
- Bonagota mexicana
- Bucculatrix parthenica
- Bucculatrix stictopus
- Callionima denticulata
- Callionima falcifera
- Callionima inuus
- Callionima nomius
- Callionima pan
- Carales astur
- Carmenta mimosa
- Catabenoides vitrina
- Cathegesis vinitincta
- Chamelania jaliscana
- Chionodes bufo
- Chionodes cacoderma
- Chionodes cerussata
- Chionodes concinna
- Chionodes creberrima
- Chionodes neptica
- Chionodes pleroma
- Chionodes scotodes
- Cibyra mexicanensis
- Cibyra terea
- Coleophora decipiens
- Coleophora mexicana
- Coleophora pelinopis
- Crambus angustexon
- Crambus autotoxellus
- Crambus bidentellus
- Crambus damotellus
- Crambus lascaellus
- Crambus racabellus
- Cyclophora coecaria
- Cydia saltitans
- Desmia albisectalis
- Desmia bifidalis
- Desmia hadriana
- Desmia pantalis
- Diastictis albovittalis
- Doa dora
- Dolicharthria retractalis
- Drastea
- Elaphria agrotina
- Elaphria nucicolora
- Elaphria subobliqua
- Elysius paranomon
- Elysius proba
- Elysius thrailkilli
- Eois agroica
- Eois coloraria
- Eois costalaria
- Eois haltima
- Eois isabella
- Eois mexicaria
- Eois nacara
- Eois nundina
- Eois operbula
- Eois ops
- Eois saria
- Eois toporata
- Eois veniliata
- Epermenia parastolidota
- Epicrisias
- Eriopyga crista
- Estigmene acrea
- Eulepte concordalis
- Eupackardia
- Eupithecia alogista
- Eupithecia balteata
- Eupithecia capitata
- Eupithecia cercina
- Eupithecia chimera
- Eupithecia chrodna
- Eupithecia classicata
- Eupithecia conduplicata
- Eupithecia consors
- Eupithecia discipuncta
- Eupithecia dustica
- Eupithecia endonephelia
- Eupithecia endotherma
- Eupithecia exophychra
- Eupithecia glaucotincta
- Eupithecia goslina
- Eupithecia indecisa
- Eupithecia kurtia
- Eupithecia lechriotorna
- Eupithecia leucographata
- Eupithecia magnifacta
- Eupithecia mediobrunnea
- Eupithecia microleuca
- Eupithecia molliaria
- Eupithecia mollita
- Eupithecia muscula
- Eupithecia obliquiplaga
- Eupithecia pactia
- Eupithecia pallidistriga
- Eupithecia pertacta
- Eupithecia pictimargo
- Eupithecia pieria
- Eupithecia planipennis
- Eupithecia platymesa
- Eupithecia rauca
- Eupithecia sellia
- Eupithecia sellimima
- Eupithecia subalba
- Eupithecia subanis
- Eupithecia supporta
- Eupithecia violetta
- Eupithecia westonaria
- Eutachyptera
- Eutelia ablatrix
- Eutelia furcata
- Evergestis insiola
- Fernandocrambus harpipterus
- Fernandocrambus nergaellus
- Fernandocrambus ruptifascia
- Fissicrambus adonis
- Fundella argentina
- Geitocochylis tarphionima
- Gnamptonychia flavicollis
- Haplochrois otiosa
- Helcystogramma daedalea
- Helcystogramma juventellus
- Helcystogramma scintillula
- Helcystogramma virescens
- Hellinsia beneficus
- Hellinsia chamelai
- Hellinsia emmorus
- Hellinsia epileucus
- Hellinsia falsus
- Hellinsia fishii
- Hellinsia fissuralba
- Hellinsia fumiventris
- Hellinsia hoguei
- Hellinsia homodactylus
- Hellinsia longifrons
- Hellinsia phlegmaticus
- Hellinsia phloeochroa
- Hellinsia socorroica
- Hellinsia sublatus
- Hellinsia tetraonipennis
- Hellinsia tinctus
- Hemaris thysbe
- Herpetogramma acyptera
- Herpetogramma cora
- Herpetogramma emphatica
- Herpetogramma holochrysis
- Herpetogramma junctalis
- Herpetogramma nigripalpis
- Herpetogramma pachycera
- Herpetogramma straminea
- Herpetogramma stramineata
- Hileithia rhealis
- Homoeocera papalo
- Horama panthalon
- Hypenolobosa glechoma
- Hyptiharpa hypostas
- Iscadia aperta
- Ischnurges bagoasalis
- Keiferia lycopersicella
- Leptosteges decetialis
- Lineodes fontella
- Lintneria xantus
- Lipocosma isola
- Macaria abydata
- Macasinia chorisma
- Magiriopsis
- Mannina hagnoleuca
- Megacaphys
- Melipotis contorta
- Microcrambus croesus
- Microcrambus elpenor
- Microcrambus jolas
- Microcrambus priamus
- Microcrambus rotarellus
- Mictopsichia atoyaca
- Mictopsichia mincae
- Mocis diffluens
- Monarda oryx
- Myolisa
- Myrmecopsis strigosa
- Neopalpa donaldtrumpi
- Niphadophylax mexicanus
- Nola involuta
- Nyctosia poicilonotus
- Odonthalitus lacticus
- Oiketicus kirbyi
- Opharus calosoma
- Opharus euchaetiformis
- Opharus linus
- Opharus momis
- Parategeticula pollenifera
- Parochromolopis mexicana
- Parornix impressipenella
- Parornix micrura
- Patania silicalis
- Pediasia mexicana
- Peridroma saucia
- Petrophila aztecalis
- Petrophila herminalis
- Phaloesia
- Phalonidia plicana
- Phassus phalerus
- Phobetron hipparchia
- Phostria citrinalis
- Phostria leucophasma
- Phostria temira
- Phyllonorycter acanthus
- Phyllonorycter chalcobaphes
- Phyllonorycter durangensis
- Phyllonorycter pictus
- Phyllonorycter splendidus
- Pilocrocis calamistis
- Pilocrocis granjae
- Polygrammodes baeuscalis
- Polygrammodes cyamon
- Polygrammodes fenestrata
- Polygrammodes hartigi
- Polygrammodes modestalis
- Polygrammodes naranja
- Prodoxus intricatus
- Pseudlithosia
- Pseuduncifera euchlanis
- Pyrausta deidamialis
- Pyrausta dissimulans
- Pyrausta euchromistes
- Pyrausta flavibrunnea
- Pyrausta morelensis
- Pyrausta postaperta
- Pyrausta rhodoxantha
- Pyrausta salvia
- Pyrausta trizonalis
- Quasieulia jaliscana
- Recurvaria flagellifer
- Recurvaria picula
- Recurvaria sartor
- Recurvaria sticta
- Recurvaria thysanota
- Schausiana
- Schinia erythrias
- Scopula calotis
- Scopula cavana
- Scopula enucloides
- Scopula grasuta
- Scopula irrubescens
- Scopula ordinaria
- Scopula thrasia
- Scopula vigensis
- Scopula vittora
- Smerinthus saliceti
- Spanioptila eucnemis
- Sphinx perelegans
- Spodoptera latifascia
- Spodoptera ornithogalli
- Stenucha
- Stigmella maya
- Stigmella racemifera
- Stilbosis amphibola
- Stilbosis incincta
- Stilbosis juvenis
- Syllepte aechmisalis
- Syllepte angulifera
- Syllepte brunnescens
- Syllepte coelivitta
- Syllepte diacymalis
- Thaumatopsis digrammellus
- Thaumatopsis melchiellus
- Tinacrucis apertana
- Tiquadra mallodeta
- Tiracola grandirena
- Tortriculladia belliferens
- Trichaea hades
- Triclonella xanthota
- Trogolegnum
- Zenamorpha
