= Adoxobotys =

Scientific classification
- Kingdom: Animalia
- Phylum: Arthropoda
- Clade: Pancrustacea
- Class: Insecta
- Order: Lepidoptera
- Family: Crambidae
- Subfamily: Pyraustinae
- Genus: Adoxobotys; Munroe, 1978

Genus of moths

Adoxobotys is a genus of moths of the family Crambidae.

== Species ==
- Adoxobotys cacidus Strand, 1907
- Adoxobotys cristobalis
- Adoxobotys discordalis (Dyar, 1914)
