= Mimcochylis plagiusa =

Scientific classification
- Kingdom: Animalia
- Phylum: Arthropoda
- Class: Insecta
- Order: Lepidoptera
- Family: Tortricidae
- Genus: Mimcochylis
- Species: M. plagiusa

Binomial name
- Mimcochylis plagiusa Razowski, 1985

Species of moth

Mimcochylis plagiusa is a species of moth of the family Tortricidae. It is found in Durango, Mexico.
