= Geitocochylis gustatoria =

Scientific classification
- Kingdom: Animalia
- Phylum: Arthropoda
- Class: Insecta
- Order: Lepidoptera
- Family: Tortricidae
- Genus: Geitocochylis
- Species: G. gustatoria

Binomial name
- Geitocochylis gustatoria Razowski, 1984

Species of moth

Geitocochylis gustatoria is a species of moth of the family Tortricidae. It is found in Durango, Mexico.
