= Mimcochylis plasmodia =

Scientific classification
- Kingdom: Animalia
- Phylum: Arthropoda
- Class: Insecta
- Order: Lepidoptera
- Family: Tortricidae
- Genus: Mimcochylis
- Species: M. plasmodia

Binomial name
- Mimcochylis plasmodia Razowski, 1985

Species of moth

Mimcochylis plasmodia is a species of moth of the family Tortricidae. It is found in Sinaloa, Mexico.
