= Mimcochylis =

Scientific classification
- Kingdom: Animalia
- Phylum: Arthropoda
- Class: Insecta
- Order: Lepidoptera
- Family: Tortricidae
- Tribe: Cochylini
- Genus: Mimcochylis; Razowski, 1985

Genus of tortrix moths

Mimcochylis is a genus of moths belonging to the family Tortricidae.

== Species ==
- Mimcochylis ochroplasta Razowski, 1985
- Mimcochylis plagiusa Razowski, 1985
- Mimcochylis planola Razowski, 1985
- Mimcochylis plasmodia Razowski, 1985

== See also ==
- List of Tortricidae genera
