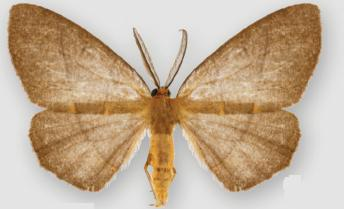
- Neotherina imperilla

Scientific classification
- Domain: Eukaryota
- Kingdom: Animalia
- Phylum: Arthropoda
- Class: Insecta
- Order: Lepidoptera
- Family: Geometridae
- Subfamily: Ennominae
- Genus: Neotherina; Dognin, 1913

= Neotherina =

Genus of moths

Neotherina is a genus of moths in the family Geometridae erected by Paul Dognin in 1913.

== Diversity and range ==
The genus is Neotropical and currently contains eight species, four of which were moved into the genus from other genera in 2000. One additional species appears to be misplaced in the genus but so far, no apomorphic characters have been defined for Neotherina.

== Selected species ==
- Neotherina callas (Druce, 1892)
- Neotherina imperilla (Dognin, 1911)
- Neotherina xanthosa Sullivan & Chacón, 2011
