= Geitocochylis =

Scientific classification
- Kingdom: Animalia
- Phylum: Arthropoda
- Class: Insecta
- Order: Lepidoptera
- Family: Tortricidae
- Tribe: Cochylini
- Genus: Geitocochylis; Razowski, 1984

Genus of tortrix moths

Geitocochylis is a genus of moths belonging to the family Tortricidae.

== Species ==
- Geitocochylis gustatoria Razowski, 1984
- Geitocochylis gyrantrum Razowski, 1984
- Geitocochylis paromala Razowski, 1984
- Geitocochylis tarphionima Razowski, 1984

== See also ==
- List of Tortricidae genera
