= Geitocochylis gyrantrum =

Scientific classification
- Kingdom: Animalia
- Phylum: Arthropoda
- Class: Insecta
- Order: Lepidoptera
- Family: Tortricidae
- Genus: Geitocochylis
- Species: G. gyrantrum

Binomial name
- Geitocochylis gyrantrum Razowski, 1984

Species of moth

Geitocochylis gyrantrum is a species of moth of the family Tortricidae. It is found in Nuevo León, Mexico.
