= Neotherina callas =

Scientific classification
- Domain: Eukaryota
- Kingdom: Animalia
- Phylum: Arthropoda
- Class: Insecta
- Order: Lepidoptera
- Family: Geometridae
- Genus: Neotherina
- Species: N. callas

Binomial name
- Neotherina callas (H. Druce, 1892)

Synonyms
- Trygodes callas H. Druce, 1892; Therina atomaria Schaus, 1901

Species of moth

Neotherina callas is a species of moth of the family Geometridae first described by Herbert Druce in 1892. It is a moderately common species is found at altitudes between 1,100 and 2,800 meters throughout Costa Rica.

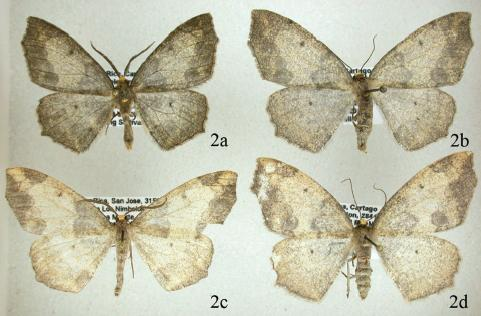
Comparison of Neotherina callas male 2a and female 2b and Neotherina xanthosa male 2c and female (2d) adults

The forewing appears to be truncated at the tip. As in most Lepidoptera, females are noticeably larger than males. The wings are diaphanous and overlaid by a distinct pattern seen only in this species and in Neotherina xanthosa. It can be separated from the latter by the darker more grayish color and its smaller size, with a male forewing length of 18–22 mm. Females have a forewing length of 19–24 mm.

Comparison of genitalic structure in Neotherina callas and N.xanthosa.

Two extremes of female signum 5a,b of N. Callas compared to N. Xanthosa 5c detail of male gnathos and furca of N. Callas 5d and N. Xanthosa 5e.
