= Mannina =

Scientific classification
- Kingdom: Animalia
- Phylum: Arthropoda
- Clade: Pancrustacea
- Class: Insecta
- Order: Lepidoptera
- Superfamily: Noctuoidea
- Family: Erebidae
- Subfamily: Arctiinae
- Genus: Mannina; Dyar, 1916

Genus of moths

Mannina is a genus of moths in the subfamily Arctiinae erected by Harrison Gray Dyar Jr. in 1916. Both species can be found in Mexico.

== Species ==
- Mannina hagnoleuca Dyar, 1916
- Mannina cninateca Turrent, 2017
