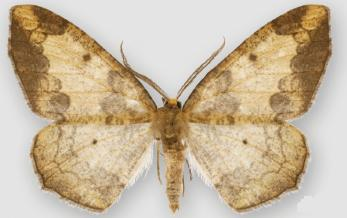
- Male
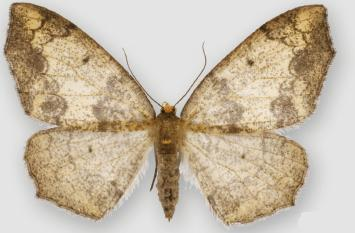
- Female

Scientific classification
- Domain: Eukaryota
- Kingdom: Animalia
- Phylum: Arthropoda
- Class: Insecta
- Order: Lepidoptera
- Family: Geometridae
- Genus: Neotherina
- Species: N. xanthosa

Binomial name
- Neotherina xanthosa Sullivan & Chacón, 2011

= Neotherina xanthosa =

Species of moth

Neotherina xanthosa is a species of moth of the family Geometridae first described by Sullivan and Chacón in 2011. It is known from above 2,400 meters in the Talamanca and the Central Volcanic ranges in Costa Rica, but its range probably extends into the other mountain ranges in Costa Rica and northern Panama.

The species is similar only to Neotherina callas, which it can be distinguished from by its yellowish-brown color and larger size. Adults are on wing year round.

== Etymology ==
The name refers to the yellowish-brown ground color of the maculation (spots).
