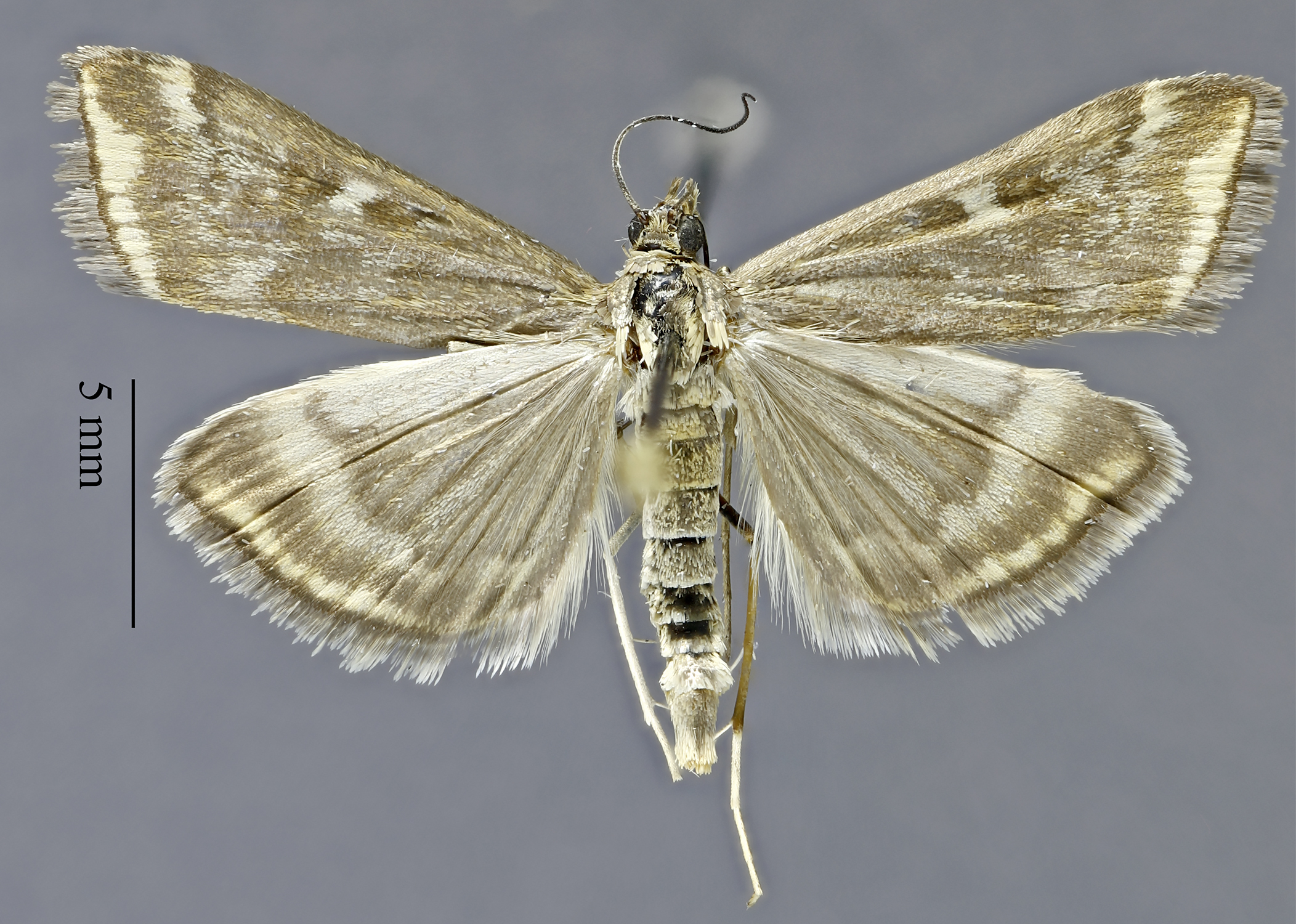

Scientific classification
- Kingdom: Animalia
- Phylum: Arthropoda
- Class: Insecta
- Order: Lepidoptera
- Family: Crambidae
- Genus: Pyrausta
- Species: P. flavibrunnea

Binomial name
- Pyrausta flavibrunnea Hampson, 1913

= Pyrausta flavibrunnea =

Species of moth

Pyrausta flavibrunnea is a moth in the family Crambidae. It was described by George Hampson in 1913. It is found in Mexico.
