= Eupithecia violetta =

Scientific classification
- Domain: Eukaryota
- Kingdom: Animalia
- Phylum: Arthropoda
- Class: Insecta
- Order: Lepidoptera
- Family: Geometridae
- Genus: Eupithecia
- Species: E. violetta

Binomial name
- Eupithecia violetta (Warren, 1906)

Synonyms
- Tephroclystia violetta Warren, 1906

Species of moth

Eupithecia violetta is a moth in the family Geometridae. It is found in Mexico.

The wingspan is about 26 mm. The forewings are violet-grey, with a brown tinge toward the costa. The lines are black. The hindwings have a central black line, running from the inner margin to the lower end of the cell.
