= Eupithecia pertacta =

Scientific classification
- Kingdom: Animalia
- Phylum: Arthropoda
- Class: Insecta
- Order: Lepidoptera
- Family: Geometridae
- Genus: Eupithecia
- Species: E. pertacta

Binomial name
- Eupithecia pertacta (Dyar, 1918)

Synonyms
- Tephroclystia pertacta Dyar, 1918

Species of moth

Eupithecia pertacta is a moth in the family Geometridae. It is found in Mexico.
