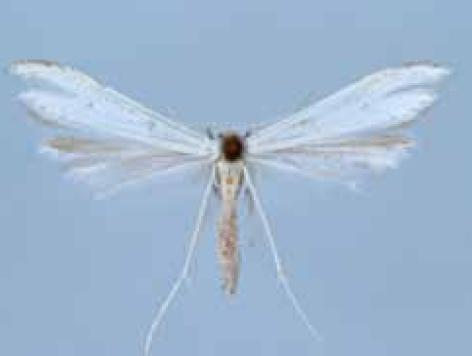

Scientific classification
- Kingdom: Animalia
- Phylum: Arthropoda
- Class: Insecta
- Order: Lepidoptera
- Family: Pterophoridae
- Genus: Hellinsia
- Species: H. homodactylus

Binomial name
- Hellinsia homodactylus (Walker, 1864)

Synonyms
- Pterophorus homodactylus Walker, 1864; Lioptilus homodactylus; Oidaematophora homodactylus

= Hellinsia homodactylus =

Species of plume moth

Hellinsia homodactylus is a moth of the family Pterophoridae. It is found in North America (including New Hampshire, New York, Maryland, California, Ontario, Oregon, Quebec, British Columbia and Alberta) and Guerrero in Mexico.

The wingspan is 22–27 mm. The head is white and the palpi and antennae are whitish. The thorax and abdomen are also white, as are the legs, although these are slightly tinged with cinereous. The forewings are white, very slightly dusted on the costa with brownish scales. There is a brownish spot before and slightly below the base of the fissure and a group of indistinct brownish scales between this and the base of the wing. There is also a faint indication of two brownish dots on the outer margin. The hindwings and fringes are pure white, with a silky lustre. In some specimens the brownish spots are absent.

The larvae have been recorded feeding on Compsilura concinnata, Oxynops anthracinus, Pseudosiphona brevirostris and Tachinophyto floridensis.
