= Eupithecia cercina =

Scientific classification
- Domain: Eukaryota
- Kingdom: Animalia
- Phylum: Arthropoda
- Class: Insecta
- Order: Lepidoptera
- Family: Geometridae
- Genus: Eupithecia
- Species: E. cercina

Binomial name
- Eupithecia cercina H. Druce, 1893

Species of moth

Eupithecia cercina is a moth in the family Geometridae. It was first described by Herbert Druce in 1893. It is known from Mexico.
