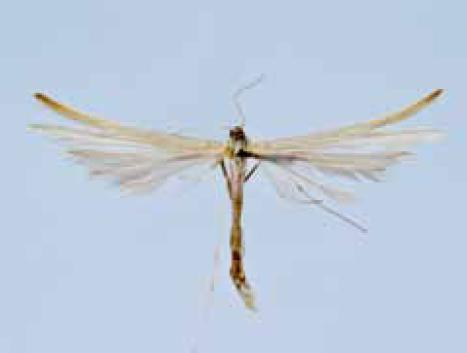

Scientific classification
- Domain: Eukaryota
- Kingdom: Animalia
- Phylum: Arthropoda
- Class: Insecta
- Order: Lepidoptera
- Family: Pterophoridae
- Genus: Hellinsia
- Species: H. fishii

Binomial name
- Hellinsia fishii (Fernald, 1893)

Synonyms
- Pterophorus fishii Fernald, 1893

= Hellinsia fishii =

Species of plume moth

Hellinsia fishii is a moth of the family Pterophoridae. It is found in North America (including Nevada, Utah, California and Alberta) and Baja California.

The wingspan is 17‑23 mm. The thorax and abdomen are white. The legs are white, but slightly tinged with brownish. The forewings are white with a few brown scales scattered over the costal portion before the fissure, forming a faint costal triangular patch, beyond which are two equidistant brown spots on the costa. The fringes are pure white. The hindwings and fringes are pure white. Adults are on wing in July.
