= Eupithecia chrodna =

Scientific classification
- Domain: Eukaryota
- Kingdom: Animalia
- Phylum: Arthropoda
- Class: Insecta
- Order: Lepidoptera
- Family: Geometridae
- Genus: Eupithecia
- Species: E. chrodna

Binomial name
- Eupithecia chrodna (H. Druce, 1893)

Synonyms
- Lepiodes chrodna H. Druce, 1893

Species of moth

Eupithecia chrodna is a moth in the family Geometridae. It was first described by Herbert Druce in 1893. It is found in Mexico. The holotype was collected in Las Vigas.

The wingspan is about 19 mm (3/4 in). The forewings and hindwings are pale greyish brown, each crossed by fine darker brown lines.
