= Eupithecia exophychra =

Scientific classification
- Domain: Eukaryota
- Kingdom: Animalia
- Phylum: Arthropoda
- Class: Insecta
- Order: Lepidoptera
- Family: Geometridae
- Genus: Eupithecia
- Species: E. exophychra

Binomial name
- Eupithecia exophychra (Dyar, 1920)

Synonyms
- Tephroclystia exophychra Dyar, 1920

Species of moth

Eupithecia exophychra is a moth in the family Geometridae. It is found in Mexico.
