= Antaeotricha admixta =

Scientific classification
- Kingdom: Animalia
- Phylum: Arthropoda
- Clade: Pancrustacea
- Class: Insecta
- Order: Lepidoptera
- Family: Depressariidae
- Genus: Antaeotricha
- Species: A. admixta

Binomial name
- Antaeotricha admixta (Walsingham, 1913)

Synonyms
- Stenoma admixta Walsingham, 1913

Species of moth in genus Antaeotricha

Antaeotricha admixta is a moth in the family Depressariidae. It was described by Lord Walsingham in 1913. It is found in Mexico (Guerrero).

The wingspan is about 21 mm. The forewings are brownish cinereous, profusely dusted with hoary whitish scaling, and dappled with diffused obscure fuscous spots, the costa narrowly pale brownish ochreous throughout, with two spots near the base, and five others, somewhat elongate, between the middle and the apex, the series being continued along the termen in five narrow marginal spots; the fuscous dappling of the wing-surface commences at the base, above the fold, forming three spots in the basal fourth, and two others below the middle of the costa, but, except for a faint indication of smaller spots along the cell, with one at its outer end, this colouring is broken up into scattered scaling, forming two small groups on the dorsum beyond the middle, but otherwise about equally distributed with the hoary white and brownish cinereous (almost brownish ochreous) which forms the general colour of the wing, a projecting group of brownish ochreous scales standing out from the dorsum near the base. The hindwings are brownish grey, with a long subcostal pencil of pale brownish grey hair-scales from near the base, above.
