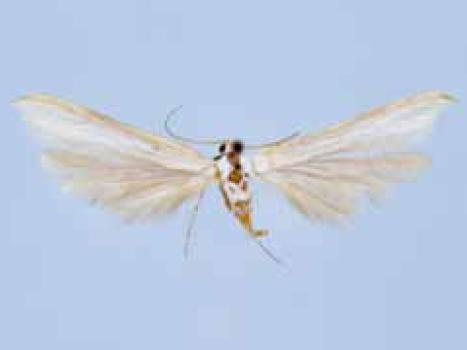

Scientific classification
- Domain: Eukaryota
- Kingdom: Animalia
- Phylum: Arthropoda
- Class: Insecta
- Order: Lepidoptera
- Family: Pterophoridae
- Genus: Hellinsia
- Species: H. falsus

Binomial name
- Hellinsia falsus (Barnes & Lindsey, 1921)

Synonyms
- Oidaematophorus falsus Barnes & Lindsey, 1921

= Hellinsia falsus =

Species of plume moth

Hellinsia falsus is a moth of the family Pterophoridae first described by William Barnes and Arthur Ward Lindsey in 1921. It is found in the US states of California and Arizona and in Mexico's Baja California.

The wingspan is 22–25.5 mm. Adults are entirely chalky white. There is a faint brownish shade in the costal region of the forewings, sometimes with the entire surface underlain with brownish gray or rarely dark. The hindwings are tinged with brownish gray. All fringes are concolorous. Adults are on wing in March, August and December.
