= Adoxobotys cristobalis =

Scientific classification
- Kingdom: Animalia
- Phylum: Arthropoda
- Clade: Pancrustacea
- Class: Insecta
- Order: Lepidoptera
- Family: Crambidae
- Genus: Adoxobotys
- Species: A. cristobalis

Binomial name
- Adoxobotys cristobalis Munroe, 1978

Species of moth

Adoxobotys cristobalis is a moth in the family Crambidae. It is found in Mexico.
