= Antaeotricha fumifica =

Scientific classification
- Domain: Eukaryota
- Kingdom: Animalia
- Phylum: Arthropoda
- Class: Insecta
- Order: Lepidoptera
- Family: Depressariidae
- Genus: Antaeotricha
- Species: A. fumifica

Binomial name
- Antaeotricha fumifica (Walsingham, 1912)

Synonyms
- Stenoma fumifica Walsingham, 1912

Species of moth

Antaeotricha fumifica is a moth in the family Depressariidae. It was described by Lord Walsingham in 1912. It is found in Mexico (Vera Cruz).

The wingspan is about 24 mm. The forewings are white, with a somewhat clearly defined dark purplish fuscous shade along the dorsal half, interrupted before and behind the middle by patches of greyish fuscous suffusion, beyond the outer of which a curved shade of the darker colour arises from the tornus reaching to two-thirds of the width of the wing. A dark purplish fuscous spot at the end of the cell touches the upper edge of the broad dorsal shade. A series of similar, but smaller spots lies around the apex and termen. The hindwings are greyish fuscous.
