= Hypenolobosa glechoma =

Scientific classification
- Kingdom: Animalia
- Phylum: Arthropoda
- Class: Insecta
- Order: Lepidoptera
- Family: Tortricidae
- Genus: Hypenolobosa
- Species: H. glechoma

Binomial name
- Hypenolobosa glechoma Razowski, 1992

Species of moth

Hypenolobosa glechoma is a species of moth of the family Tortricidae. It is found in Chihuahua, Mexico.
