= Antaeotricha fractilinea =

Scientific classification
- Domain: Eukaryota
- Kingdom: Animalia
- Phylum: Arthropoda
- Class: Insecta
- Order: Lepidoptera
- Family: Depressariidae
- Genus: Antaeotricha
- Species: A. fractilinea

Binomial name
- Antaeotricha fractilinea (Walsingham, 1912)

Synonyms
- Stenoma fractilinea Walsingham, 1912

Species of moth

Antaeotricha fractilinea is a moth in the family Depressariidae. It was described by Lord Walsingham in 1912. It is found in Mexico (Tabasco).

The wingspan is about 14 mm. The forewings are pale fawn ochreous, with an elongate dorsal shade at the extreme base, and two transverse lines beyond the middle, rust brown. The first line commences a little below a strong median costal spot, and, tending outward to the upper angle of the cell, is curved downward and again outward to the dorsum. The second, commencing in a smaller costal spot at three-fourths, and slightly interrupted between the veins, tends obliquely outward nearly to the middle of the termen, thence descending to the tornus, where it joins the lower spot in a series of about seven, which follow the termen and extend around the apex. In addition to these markings three minute spots form an oblique series crossing the disc from about one-fourth from the base, the upper one elongate, oblique, the second beyond and below it on the disc, the third still further from the base, forming a minute dot on the fold. The hindwings are pale bone grey.
