= Coleophora pelinopis =

Scientific classification
- Kingdom: Animalia
- Phylum: Arthropoda
- Class: Insecta
- Order: Lepidoptera
- Family: Coleophoridae
- Genus: Coleophora
- Species: C. pelinopis

Binomial name
- Coleophora pelinopis Meyrick, 1933

Species of moth

Coleophora pelinopis is a moth of the family Coleophoridae. It is found in Mexico.
