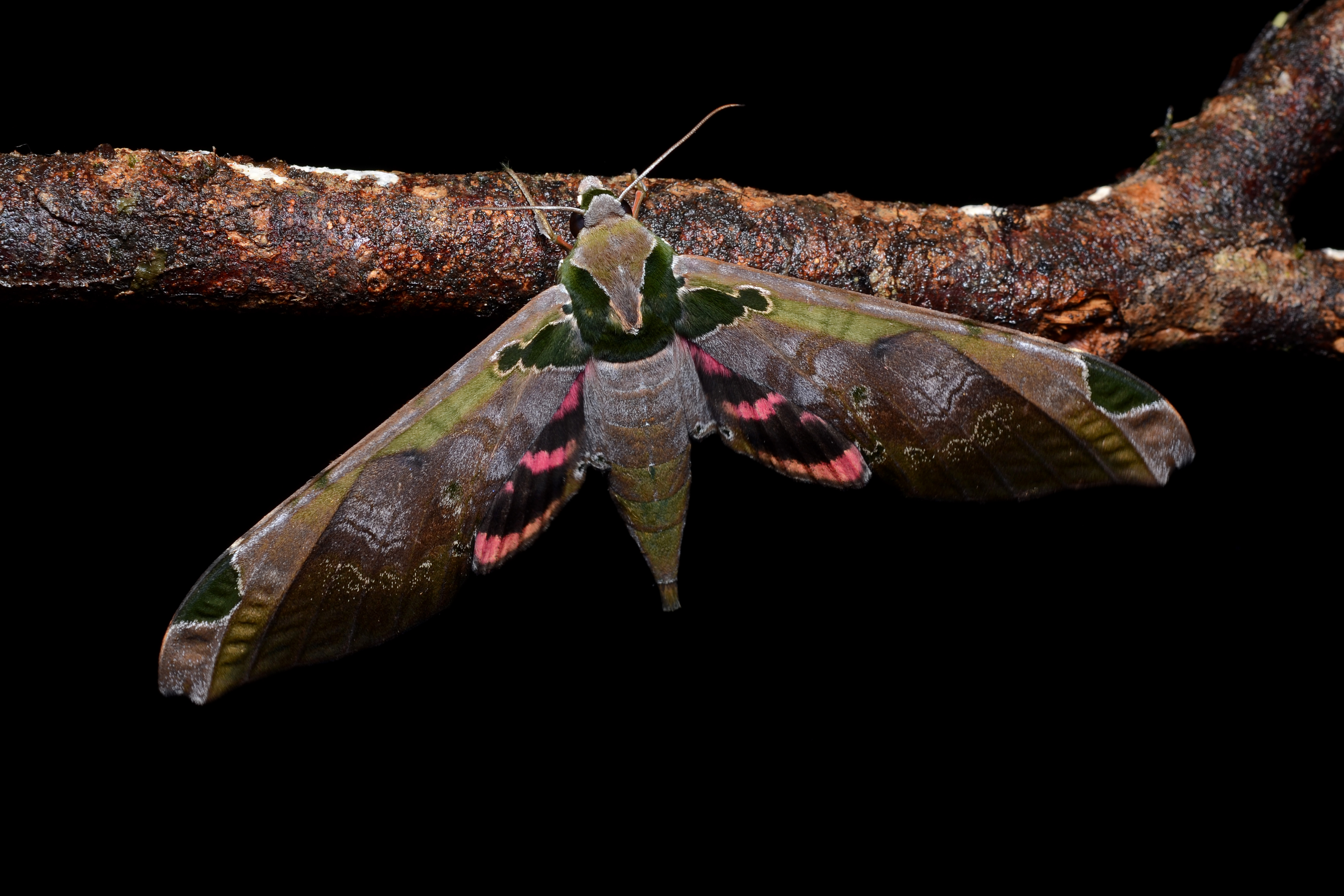

Scientific classification
- Kingdom: Animalia
- Phylum: Arthropoda
- Class: Insecta
- Order: Lepidoptera
- Family: Sphingidae
- Genus: Adhemarius
- Species: A. ypsilon

Binomial name
- Adhemarius ypsilon (Rothschild & Jordan, 1903)

Synonyms
- Amplypterus ypsilon Rothschild & Jordan, 1903

= Adhemarius ypsilon =

Species of moth

Adhemarius ypsilon is a species of moth in the family Sphingidae. It was described by Rothschild and Jordan in 1903 and is known from Costa Rica, Mexico, Belize, Guatemala, Nicaragua, Venezuela, French Guiana, Ecuador, Peru, and Bolivia.

The wingspan is 89–117 mm for males and 107–126 mm for females. In Costa Rica, moths in this species take flight year round.

The larvae feed on several species in the plant genus Ocotea (including Ocotea veraguensis, Ocotea atirrensis, Ocotea sarah and Ocotea dendrodaphne).

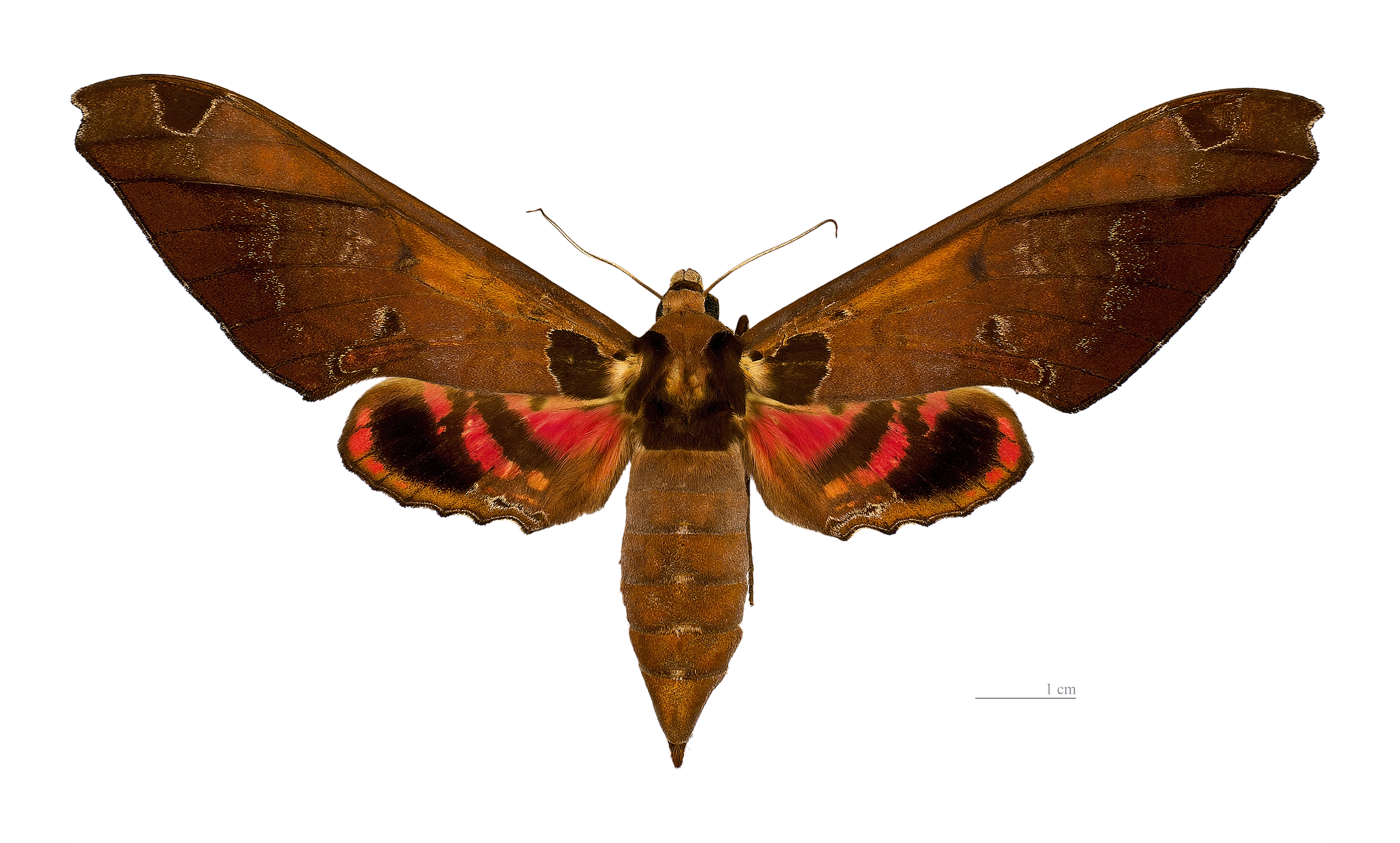
Female - dorsal side

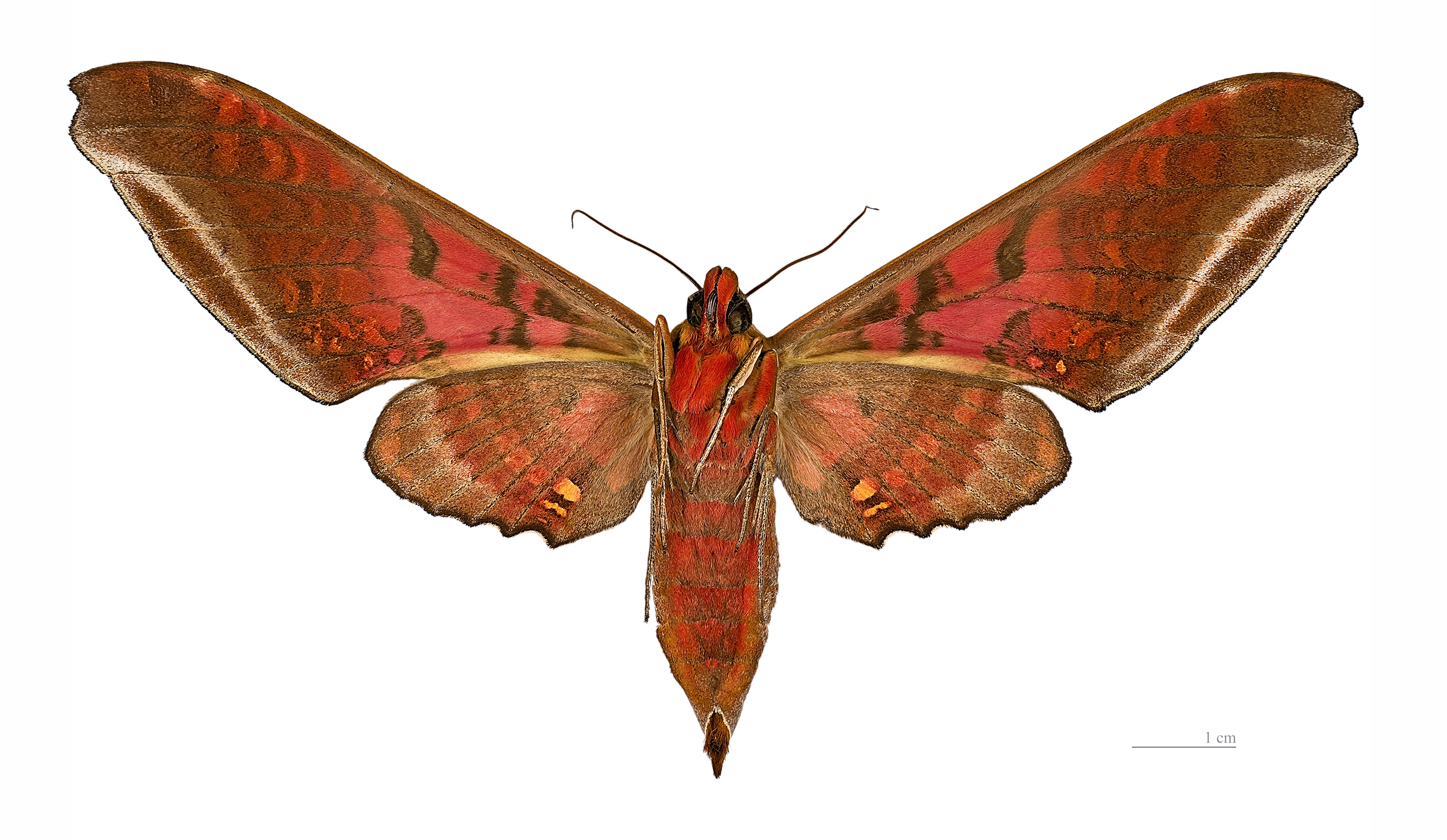
Female - ventral side

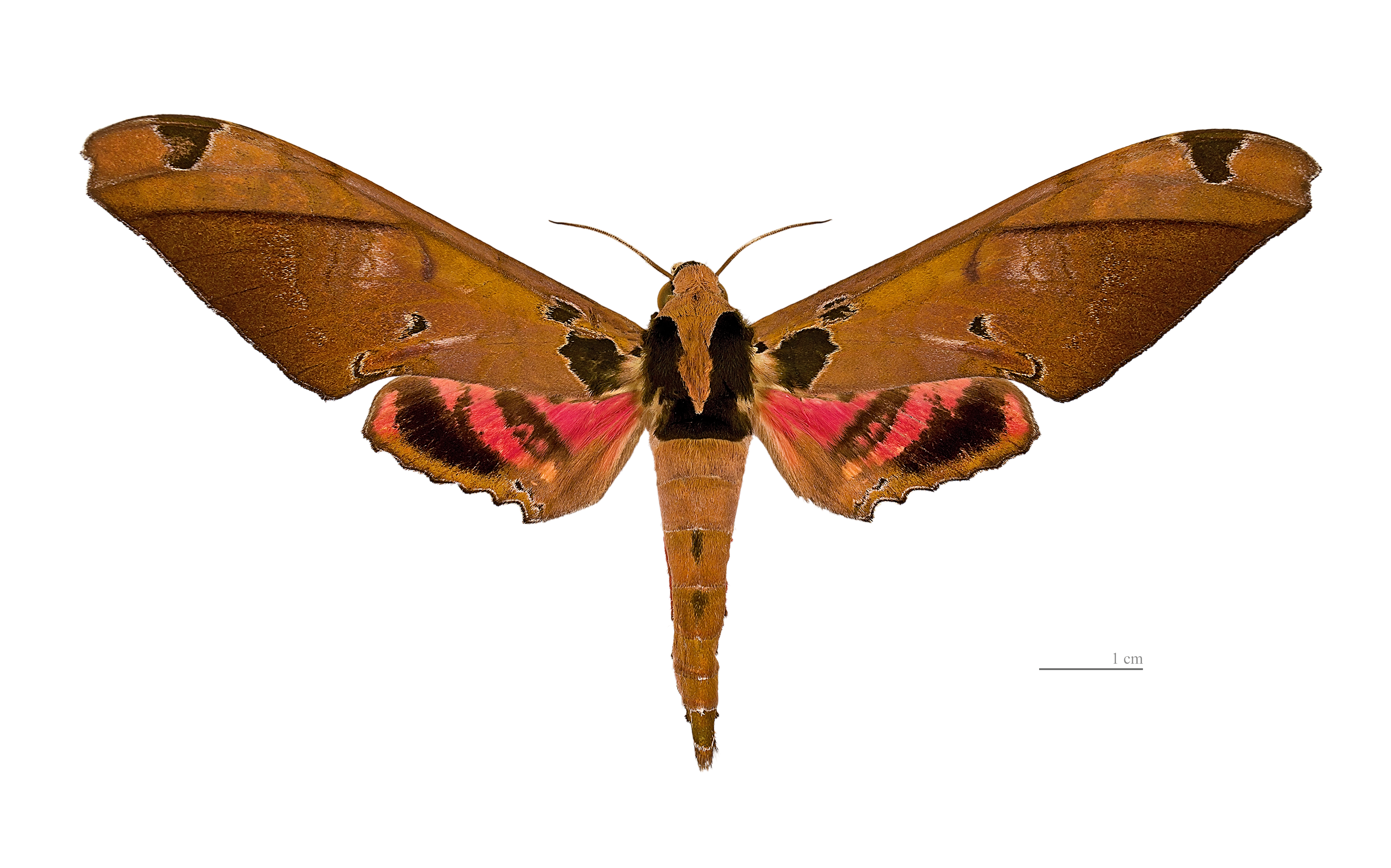
Male - dorsal side

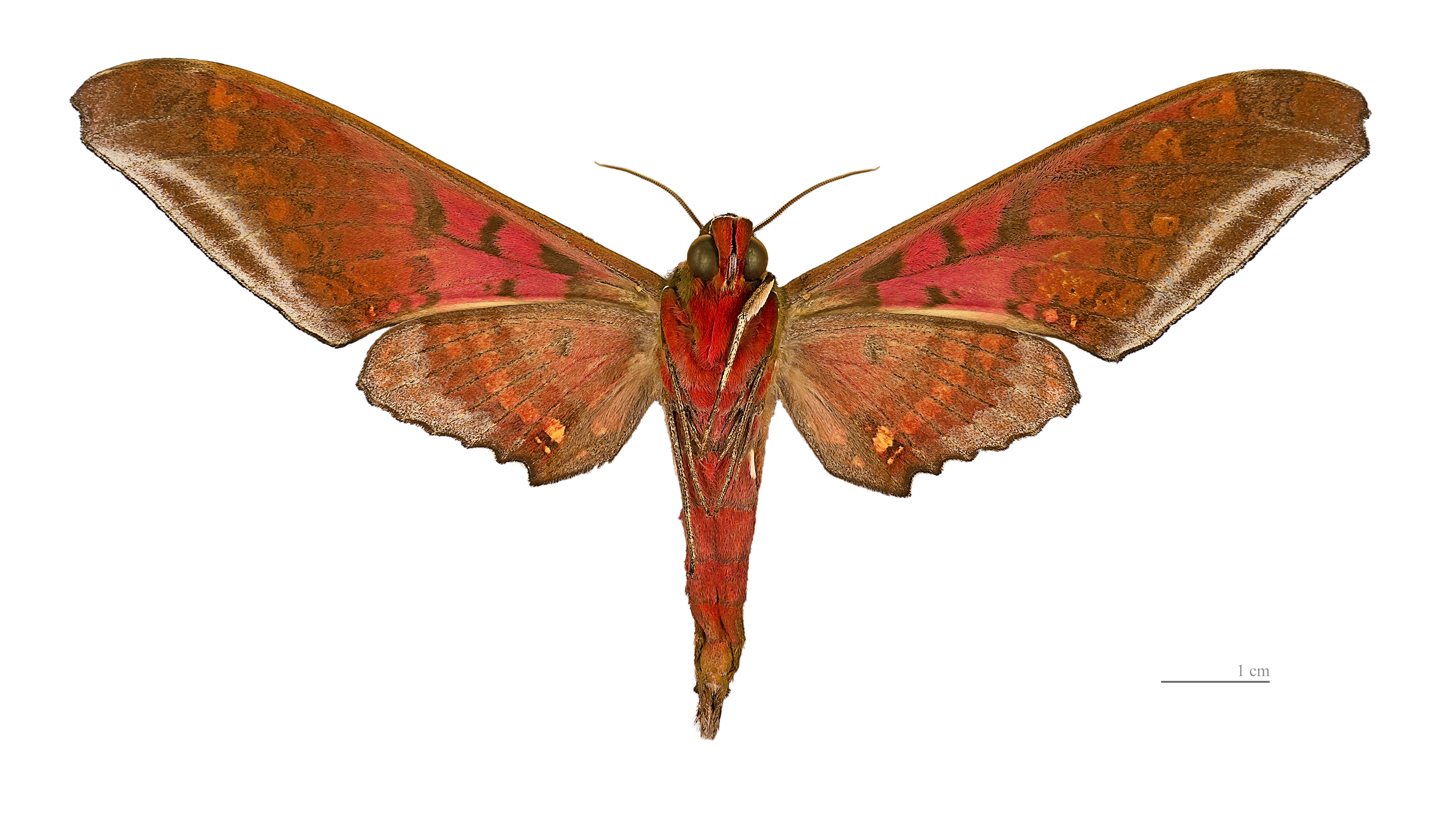
Male - ventral side
