= Antaeotricha ammodes =

Scientific classification
- Kingdom: Animalia
- Phylum: Arthropoda
- Clade: Pancrustacea
- Class: Insecta
- Order: Lepidoptera
- Family: Depressariidae
- Genus: Antaeotricha
- Species: A. ammodes

Binomial name
- Antaeotricha ammodes (Walsingham, 1913)

Synonyms
- Stenoma ammodes Walsingham, 1913

Species of moth in genus Antaeotricha

Antaeotricha ammodes is a moth in the family Depressariidae. It was described by Lord Walsinghamin 1913. It is found in Mexico (Tabasco).

The wingspan is about 15.5 mm. The forewings are rich bright ochreous, unicolorous, except for a few, even more intensely coloured, long scales about the flexus. The hindwings are shining pale yellowish.
