= Antaeotricha forreri =

Scientific classification
- Domain: Eukaryota
- Kingdom: Animalia
- Phylum: Arthropoda
- Class: Insecta
- Order: Lepidoptera
- Family: Depressariidae
- Genus: Antaeotricha
- Species: A. forreri

Binomial name
- Antaeotricha forreri (Walsingham, 1913)

Synonyms
- Stenoma forreri Walsingham, 1913

Species of moth

Antaeotricha forreri is a moth in the family Depressariidae. It was described by Lord Walsingham in 1913. It is found in Panama and Mexico (Durango).

The wingspan is about 20 mm. The forewings are creamy whitish, with irregular pale brownish ochreous suffusion, a dark fuscous dorsal patch commences at the base below the fold, and extends to about one-fifth. A short transverse black streak lies on the cross-vein at the end of the cell, a line of brownish scales extending to the dorsum below it. A slight brownish ochreous shade, on the costa at four-fifths, gives rise to a faint outwardly curved line of the same colour, which reverts to the dorsum before the tornus, and beyond this is a subapical shade of diffused brownish scales. The hindwings are pale tawny brownish.
