= Scopula calotis =

Scientific classification
- Domain: Eukaryota
- Kingdom: Animalia
- Phylum: Arthropoda
- Class: Insecta
- Order: Lepidoptera
- Family: Geometridae
- Genus: Scopula
- Species: S. calotis

Binomial name
- Scopula calotis (Dyar, 1912)

Synonyms
- Pigia calotis Dyar, 1912

Species of geometer moth in subfamily Sterrhinae

Scopula calotis is a moth of the family Geometridae. It is endemic to Mexico. It was first described by Dyar in 1912.
