= Eupithecia subalba =

Scientific classification
- Domain: Eukaryota
- Kingdom: Animalia
- Phylum: Arthropoda
- Class: Insecta
- Order: Lepidoptera
- Family: Geometridae
- Genus: Eupithecia
- Species: E. subalba

Binomial name
- Eupithecia subalba (Warren, 1906)

Synonyms
- Tephroclystia subalba Warren, 1906

Species of moth

Eupithecia subalba is a moth in the family Geometridae. It is found in Mexico.

The wingspan is about 18 mm. The forewings are ochreous, thickly dusted with grey. The lines are very obscure. The hindwings are white, dusted with sandy-grey along the inner margin.
