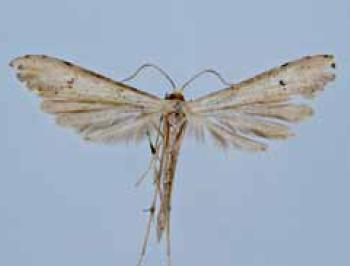

Scientific classification
- Kingdom: Animalia
- Phylum: Arthropoda
- Clade: Pancrustacea
- Class: Insecta
- Order: Lepidoptera
- Family: Pterophoridae
- Genus: Hellinsia
- Species: H. fumiventris

Binomial name
- Hellinsia fumiventris (Zeller, 1877)

Synonyms
- Mimeseoptilus fumiventris Zeller, 1877

= Hellinsia fumiventris =

Species of plume moth

Hellinsia fumiventris is a moth of the family Pterophoridae. It is found in Colombia, Ecuador, Mexico and Peru.

The wingspan is 19‑22 mm. Adults are on wing in February and from September to November, at altitudes up to 2,850 meters.

The larvae feed on Parthenium hysterophorus.
