= Eupithecia endotherma =

Scientific classification
- Kingdom: Animalia
- Phylum: Arthropoda
- Class: Insecta
- Order: Lepidoptera
- Family: Geometridae
- Genus: Eupithecia
- Species: E. endotherma

Binomial name
- Eupithecia endotherma (Dyar, 1920)

Synonyms
- Tephroclystia endotherma Dyar, 1920

Species of moth

Eupithecia endotherma is a moth in the family Geometridae. It is found in Mexico.
