= Eupithecia goslina =

Scientific classification
- Domain: Eukaryota
- Kingdom: Animalia
- Phylum: Arthropoda
- Class: Insecta
- Order: Lepidoptera
- Family: Geometridae
- Genus: Eupithecia
- Species: E. goslina

Binomial name
- Eupithecia goslina (Warren, 1906)

Synonyms
- Tephroclystia goslina Warren, 1906

Species of moth

Eupithecia goslina is a moth in the family Geometridae. It is found in Mexico.
