= Eupithecia supporta =

Scientific classification
- Kingdom: Animalia
- Phylum: Arthropoda
- Class: Insecta
- Order: Lepidoptera
- Family: Geometridae
- Genus: Eupithecia
- Species: E. supporta

Binomial name
- Eupithecia supporta (Dyar, 1918)

Synonyms
- Tephroclystia supporta Dyar, 1918

Species of moth

Eupithecia supporta is a moth in the family Geometridae. It is found in Mexico.
