= Antaeotricha comosa =

Scientific classification
- Domain: Eukaryota
- Kingdom: Animalia
- Phylum: Arthropoda
- Class: Insecta
- Order: Lepidoptera
- Family: Depressariidae
- Genus: Antaeotricha
- Species: A. comosa

Binomial name
- Antaeotricha comosa (Walsingham, 1912)

Synonyms
- Stenoma comosa Walsingham, 1912

Species of moth

Antaeotricha comosa is a moth in the family Depressariidae. It was described by Lord Walsingham in 1912. It is found in Mexico (Vera Cruz).

The wingspan is about 22 mm. The forewings are shining, white, a narrow, delicate, shade of fawn-ochreous along the costa, a stronger shade of fawn-grey along the dorsum, occupying the space below the fold, and slightly overlapping the fold at its outer half; in this broad fawn-grey shade are two conspicuous brown dorsal blotches. The first quadrate, scarcely before the middle, some scattered scales of the same colour extending obliquely inward on to the cell. The second, somewhat triangular, extending to the tornus, sending out a slender, fluctuate line of the same colour obliquely inward across the cell, ending below the middle of the costa. A further irregular line of brown spots curves upward from the tornus and reverts to the costa at the commencement of the costal cilia, six brown marginal spots extend along the termen, a small elongate spot occurring near the base of the wing a little below the fold. The hindwings are pale brownish grey.
