= Antaeotricha cryeropis =

Scientific classification
- Domain: Eukaryota
- Kingdom: Animalia
- Phylum: Arthropoda
- Class: Insecta
- Order: Lepidoptera
- Family: Depressariidae
- Genus: Antaeotricha
- Species: A. cryeropis

Binomial name
- Antaeotricha cryeropis Meyrick, 1926

Species of moth

Antaeotricha cryeropis is a moth in the family Depressariidae. It was described by Edward Meyrick in 1926. It is found in Mexico (Guerrero).

The wingspan is 23–25 mm. The forewings are white with a grey mottled blotch along the basal fourth of the costa, from the extremity of this an indistinct oblique grey shade runs to the posterior edge of a similar blotch partially mottled with blackish irroration extending along the dorsum from near the base to near the middle. There are two small somewhat obliquely placed dark grey subconfluent spots on the end of the cell, surrounded by a large irregular grey blotch, beneath this a cloudy dark grey spot on the dorsum at two-thirds. A somewhat curved erect grey shade is found from the dorsum before the tornus reaching two-thirds across the wing, and a lighter irregular or almost macular shade from the tornus more nearly reaching the costa. There is a grey terminal line. The hindwings are light grey, towards the base suffused whitish. The costa in males is rather expanded anteriorly, with a fringe of mostly white projecting scales, and a subcostal whitish hairpencil from the base reaching the middle.
