= Scopula irrubescens =

Scientific classification
- Domain: Eukaryota
- Kingdom: Animalia
- Phylum: Arthropoda
- Class: Insecta
- Order: Lepidoptera
- Family: Geometridae
- Genus: Scopula
- Species: S. irrubescens

Binomial name
- Scopula irrubescens Prout, 1934

Synonyms
- Synelys irrufata Warren, 1906 (preocc.)

Species of geometer moth in subfamily Sterrhinae

Scopula irrubescens is a moth of the family Geometridae. It is found in Mexico.
