= Eupithecia pactia =

Scientific classification
- Domain: Eukaryota
- Kingdom: Animalia
- Phylum: Arthropoda
- Class: Insecta
- Order: Lepidoptera
- Family: Geometridae
- Genus: Eupithecia
- Species: E. pactia

Binomial name
- Eupithecia pactia H. Druce, 1893

Species of moth

Eupithecia pactia is a moth in the family Geometridae first described by Herbert Druce in 1893. It is found in Mexico.
