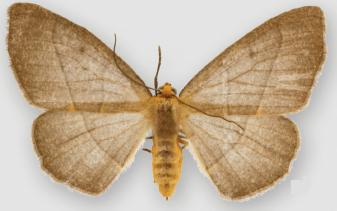
- Female
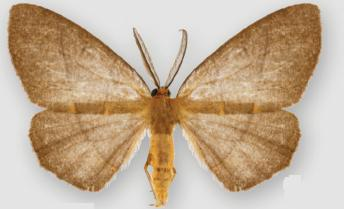
- Male

Scientific classification
- Domain: Eukaryota
- Kingdom: Animalia
- Phylum: Arthropoda
- Class: Insecta
- Order: Lepidoptera
- Family: Geometridae
- Genus: Neotherina
- Species: N. imperilla

Binomial name
- Neotherina imperilla (Dognin, 1911)

Synonyms
- Nephodia imperilla Dognin, 1911; Neotherina inconspicua Dognin, 1913

= Neotherina imperilla =

Species of moth

Neotherina imperilla is a species of moth of the family Geometridae first described by Paul Dognin in 1911. It is found in Colombia and Costa Rica.

The ground colour is orange brown with distinct medial and postmedial lines crossing the forewings. It may be distinguished from similar species by the rounded apex and orange-brown colour of the forewings.
