= Stigmella racemifera =

Scientific classification
- Kingdom: Animalia
- Phylum: Arthropoda
- Clade: Pancrustacea
- Class: Insecta
- Order: Lepidoptera
- Family: Nepticulidae
- Genus: Stigmella
- Species: S. racemifera

Binomial name
- Stigmella racemifera Šimkevičiūtė & Stonis, 2009

Species of moth

Stigmella racemifera is a species of moth in the family Nepticulidae. It is known only from the Pacific Coast of Mexico in the Oaxaca region.

The habitat consists of secondary forests. Adults are on wing from November to December.
