= Mannina hagnoleuca =

Scientific classification
- Kingdom: Animalia
- Phylum: Arthropoda
- Clade: Pancrustacea
- Class: Insecta
- Order: Lepidoptera
- Superfamily: Noctuoidea
- Family: Erebidae
- Subfamily: Arctiinae
- Genus: Mannina
- Species: M. hagnoleuca

Binomial name
- Mannina hagnoleuca Dyar, 1916

Species of moth

Mannina hagnoleuca is a moth in the subfamily Arctiinae first described by Harrison Gray Dyar Jr. in 1916. It can be found in Mexico.
