= Elysius paranomon =

Scientific classification
- Kingdom: Animalia
- Phylum: Arthropoda
- Class: Insecta
- Order: Lepidoptera
- Superfamily: Noctuoidea
- Family: Erebidae
- Subfamily: Arctiinae
- Genus: Elysius
- Species: E. paranomon

Binomial name
- Elysius paranomon (Dyar, 1912)

Synonyms
- Ammalo paranomon, Dyar, 1912

Species of moth

Elysius paranomon is a moth of the family Erebidae that is found in Mexico.
