= Stigmella maya =

Scientific classification
- Kingdom: Animalia
- Phylum: Arthropoda
- Clade: Pancrustacea
- Class: Insecta
- Order: Lepidoptera
- Family: Nepticulidae
- Genus: Stigmella
- Species: S. maya

Binomial name
- Stigmella maya Stonis, Remeikis, Diskus and Noreika, 2013

Species of moth

Stigmella maya is a moth of the family Nepticulidae. It is found on the Yucatán Peninsula of southeastern Mexico.

This species is among the smallest Lepidoptera in the world.

The larvae feed on Karwinskia humboldtiana. They mine the leaves of their host plant.
