= Eupithecia obliquiplaga =

Scientific classification
- Kingdom: Animalia
- Phylum: Arthropoda
- Class: Insecta
- Order: Lepidoptera
- Family: Geometridae
- Genus: Eupithecia
- Species: E. obliquiplaga

Binomial name
- Eupithecia obliquiplaga (Dyar, 1927)

Synonyms
- Eucymatoge obliquiplaga Dyar, 1927

Species of moth

Eupithecia obliquiplaga is a moth in the family Geometridae. It is found in Mexico.
