= Antaeotricha caprimulga =

Scientific classification
- Domain: Eukaryota
- Kingdom: Animalia
- Phylum: Arthropoda
- Class: Insecta
- Order: Lepidoptera
- Family: Depressariidae
- Genus: Antaeotricha
- Species: A. caprimulga

Binomial name
- Antaeotricha caprimulga (Walsingham, 1912)

Synonyms
- Stenoma caprimulga Walsingham, 1912

Species of moth

Antaeotricha caprimulga is a moth in the family Depressariidae. It was described by Lord Walsingham in 1912. It is found in Mexico (Vera Cruz).

The wingspan is about 20 mm. The forewings are white, partially suffused with brownish grey mixed with fuscous, the base and dorsum are almost entirely suffused, the ill-defined outer edge of the shaded area extending from the costa at one-fourth obliquely to the tornus, where it is joined by a more broken transverse shade from the costa before the apex, which is preceded by a strong triangular dark fuscous spot at the end of the cell. The apex and termen are also shaded with brown-grey, mixed, as are the other shades, with dark fuscous scales distributed about them. The hindwings are pale brownish grey, in males with an ochreous costal hair-pencil.
