= Adoxobotys cacidus =

Scientific classification
- Kingdom: Animalia
- Phylum: Arthropoda
- Clade: Pancrustacea
- Class: Insecta
- Order: Lepidoptera
- Family: Crambidae
- Genus: Adoxobotys
- Species: A. cacidus

Binomial name
- Adoxobotys cacidus (Dyar, 1918)

Synonyms
- Pionea cacidus Dyar, 1918

Species of moth

Adoxobotys cacidus is a moth in the family Crambidae. It was described by Harrison Gray Dyar Jr. in 1918. It is found in Mexico.
