= Eois mexicaria =

Scientific classification
- Kingdom: Animalia
- Phylum: Arthropoda
- Clade: Pancrustacea
- Class: Insecta
- Order: Lepidoptera
- Family: Geometridae
- Genus: Eois
- Species: E. mexicaria

Binomial name
- Eois mexicaria (Walker, 1866)

Synonyms
- Cambogia mexicaria Walker, 1866

Species of moth

Eois mexicaria is a moth in the family Geometridae. It is found in Mexico.

The larvae have been recorded feeding on Piper auritum and Piper umbricola.
