= Eupithecia platymesa =

Scientific classification
- Kingdom: Animalia
- Phylum: Arthropoda
- Class: Insecta
- Order: Lepidoptera
- Family: Geometridae
- Genus: Eupithecia
- Species: E. platymesa

Binomial name
- Eupithecia platymesa (Dyar, 1918)

Synonyms
- Mesoleuca platymesa Dyar, 1918

Species of moth

Eupithecia platymesa is a moth in the family Geometridae. It is found in Mexico.
