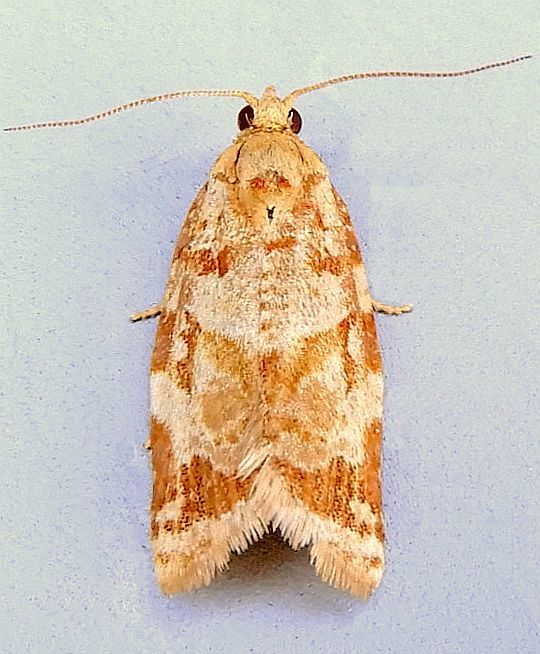

Scientific classification
- Kingdom: Animalia
- Phylum: Arthropoda
- Clade: Pancrustacea
- Class: Insecta
- Order: Lepidoptera
- Family: Tortricidae
- Genus: Argyrotaenia
- Species: A. montezumae

Binomial name
- Argyrotaenia montezumae (Walsingham, 1914)

Synonyms
- Tortrix montezumae Walsingham, 1914; Argyrotaenia montezumae huachucensis Obraztsov, 1961; Tortrix impositana Walsingham, 1914

= Argyrotaenia montezumae =

Species of moth

Argyrotaenia montezumae is a species of moth of the family Tortricidae. It is found in Guatemala, Mexico and the United States, where it has been recorded from Arizona and New Mexico.

The wingspan is 16–20 mm. Adults have been recorded on wing in July and August.

The larvae feed on Eupatorium species, Parthenium hysterophorus, Persea americana, Lilium longiflorum var. eximium and Gossypium herbaceum.
