= Scopula grasuta =

Scientific classification
- Domain: Eukaryota
- Kingdom: Animalia
- Phylum: Arthropoda
- Class: Insecta
- Order: Lepidoptera
- Family: Geometridae
- Genus: Scopula
- Species: S. grasuta

Binomial name
- Scopula grasuta (Schaus, 1901)

Synonyms
- Ptychopoda grasuta Schaus, 1901; Scopula grasuta ab. admes Prout, 1938

Species of geometer moth in subfamily Sterrhinae

Scopula grasuta is a moth of the family Geometridae. It is found in Mexico and Guatemala.
