= Antaeotricha ergates =

Scientific classification
- Domain: Eukaryota
- Kingdom: Animalia
- Phylum: Arthropoda
- Class: Insecta
- Order: Lepidoptera
- Family: Depressariidae
- Genus: Antaeotricha
- Species: A. ergates

Binomial name
- Antaeotricha ergates (Walsingham, 1913)

Synonyms
- Stenoma ergates Walsingham, 1913

Species of moth

Antaeotricha ergates is a moth in the family Depressariidae. It was described by Lord Walsingham in 1913. It is found in Mexico (Tabasco).

The wingspan is about 24 mm. The forewings are whitish ochreous, slightly tinged with brown between the veins, more noticeably between veins 9 and 10, and 10 and 11. A distinct ochreous tinge runs along the costa and around the termen, as also along the margins of an elongate chocolate-brown patch, extending to nearly three-fourths the wing-length and occupying the space between the upper edge of the cell and the dorsum. The outer extremity of this patch is rounded above and below, and the ochreous tinge which forms its margin separates it from the dorsum as far as the lower extremity of a slightly outward-curved streak, which divides it into two almost equal parts, extending obliquely from the middle of its upper edge to the dorsum at half the wing-length. The hindwings are whitish-ochreous, suffused with brownish.
