= Antaeotricha zelotes =

Scientific classification
- Kingdom: Animalia
- Phylum: Arthropoda
- Clade: Pancrustacea
- Class: Insecta
- Order: Lepidoptera
- Family: Depressariidae
- Genus: Antaeotricha
- Species: A. zelotes

Binomial name
- Antaeotricha zelotes (Walsingham, 1912)

Synonyms
- Stenoma zelotes Walsingham, 1912

Species of moth

Antaeotricha zelotes is a moth in the family Depressariidae. It was described by Lord Walsingham in 1912. It is found in Mexico (Guerrero).

The wingspan is 15–20 mm. The forewings are dull fawn-grey, the costal third whitish, the white mixing with the darker dorsal colouring beyond the end of the cell to the termen. From the middle of the costa an outwardly oblique line of diffused fawn-brown scales runs to a small fuscous spot at the end of the cell. Beyond it a similar parallel line is recurved to the dorsum before the tornus, after reaching the point opposite to the middle of the termen; a small elongate fuscous spot, at one-fourth from the base, is placed on the upper edge of the cell, and a series of similar but smaller spots follows the margin beyond the outwardly curved second costal line, reaching to the tornus. The hindwings are very pale brownish grey.
