= Eois veniliata =

Scientific classification
- Kingdom: Animalia
- Phylum: Arthropoda
- Clade: Pancrustacea
- Class: Insecta
- Order: Lepidoptera
- Family: Geometridae
- Genus: Eois
- Species: E. veniliata

Binomial name
- Eois veniliata (Walker, 1861)

Synonyms
- Achlora veniliata Walker, 1861; Cambogia leprosa Felder & Rogenhofer, 1875

Species of moth

Eois veniliata is a moth in the family Geometridae. It is found in Brazil and Mexico.
