= Phyllonorycter chalcobaphes =

Scientific classification
- Domain: Eukaryota
- Kingdom: Animalia
- Phylum: Arthropoda
- Class: Insecta
- Order: Lepidoptera
- Family: Gracillariidae
- Genus: Phyllonorycter
- Species: P. chalcobaphes

Binomial name
- Phyllonorycter chalcobaphes (Walsingham, 1914)

Species of moth

Phyllonorycter chalcobaphes is a moth of the family Gracillariidae. It is known from Mexico.
