= Phyllonorycter pictus =

Scientific classification
- Domain: Eukaryota
- Kingdom: Animalia
- Phylum: Arthropoda
- Class: Insecta
- Order: Lepidoptera
- Family: Gracillariidae
- Genus: Phyllonorycter
- Species: P. pictus

Binomial name
- Phyllonorycter pictus (Walsingham, 1914)

Species of moth

Phyllonorycter pictus is a moth of the family Gracillariidae. It is known from Mexico and was discovered in 1914 by Walsingham.
