= Eupithecia pieria =

Scientific classification
- Domain: Eukaryota
- Kingdom: Animalia
- Phylum: Arthropoda
- Class: Insecta
- Order: Lepidoptera
- Family: Geometridae
- Genus: Eupithecia
- Species: E. pieria

Binomial name
- Eupithecia pieria (H. Druce, 1893)

Synonyms
- Lepiodes pieria H. H. Druce, 1893; Tephroclystia longicorpus Warren, 1897

Species of moth

Eupithecia pieria is a moth in the family Geometridae. It was first described by Herbert Druce in 1893. It is found in Mexico and Bolivia.
