= Coleophora mexicana =

Scientific classification
- Kingdom: Animalia
- Phylum: Arthropoda
- Clade: Pancrustacea
- Class: Insecta
- Order: Lepidoptera
- Family: Coleophoridae
- Genus: Coleophora
- Species: C. mexicana

Binomial name
- Coleophora mexicana Landry, 1994

Species of moth

Coleophora mexicana is a moth of the family Coleophoridae. It is found in Tamaulipas in Mexico.

The forewing length is 4.8 mm (0.19 in) for the holotype, a male. It was collected at 1,000 m (3,300 ft) above sea level at the Rancho del Cielo (El Cielo Biosphere Reserve).
