= Adoxobotys discordalis =

Scientific classification
- Kingdom: Animalia
- Phylum: Arthropoda
- Clade: Pancrustacea
- Class: Insecta
- Order: Lepidoptera
- Family: Crambidae
- Genus: Adoxobotys
- Species: A. discordalis

Binomial name
- Adoxobotys discordalis (Dyar, 1914)

Synonyms
- Pionea discordalis Dyar, 1914

Species of moth

Adoxobotys discordalis is a moth in the family Crambidae. It was described by Harrison Gray Dyar Jr. in 1914. It is found in Mexico.
