= Antaeotricha demotica =

Scientific classification
- Domain: Eukaryota
- Kingdom: Animalia
- Phylum: Arthropoda
- Class: Insecta
- Order: Lepidoptera
- Family: Depressariidae
- Genus: Antaeotricha
- Species: A. demotica

Binomial name
- Antaeotricha demotica (Walsingham, 1912)

Synonyms
- Stenoma demotica Walsingham, 1912

Species of moth

Antaeotricha demotica is a moth in the family Depressariidae. It was described by Lord Walsingham in 1912. It is found in Mexico (Guerrero) and Guatemala.

The wingspan is about 24 mm. The forewings are dull bone-whitish, the costa very narrowly clean bone-white throughout, the remainder of the wing more or less suffused and speckled with brownish grey, the dorsal half more strongly suffused than the costal, and more widely towards the base than to the termen; crossing the wing are three lines of still darker brownish fuscous spots (more or less coalescing into a continuous shade in the first two), of these, the first commences indistinctly on the costa at about one-sixth, and descending obliquely outward to the dorsum about the middle includes a discal spot at the upper edge of the cell and a plical spot beneath it. The second, commencing at about the middle of the costa, includes a single strong spot at the end of the cell and expands into a diffuse shade to the dorsum, there coalescing with the lower extremity of the third line which is obliquely bowed outward beyond the cell half-way to the termen. A line of seven or eight blackish dots extends around the apex and termen before the shining pale brownish grey cilia. The hindwings are grey, with a slight rosy tinge.
