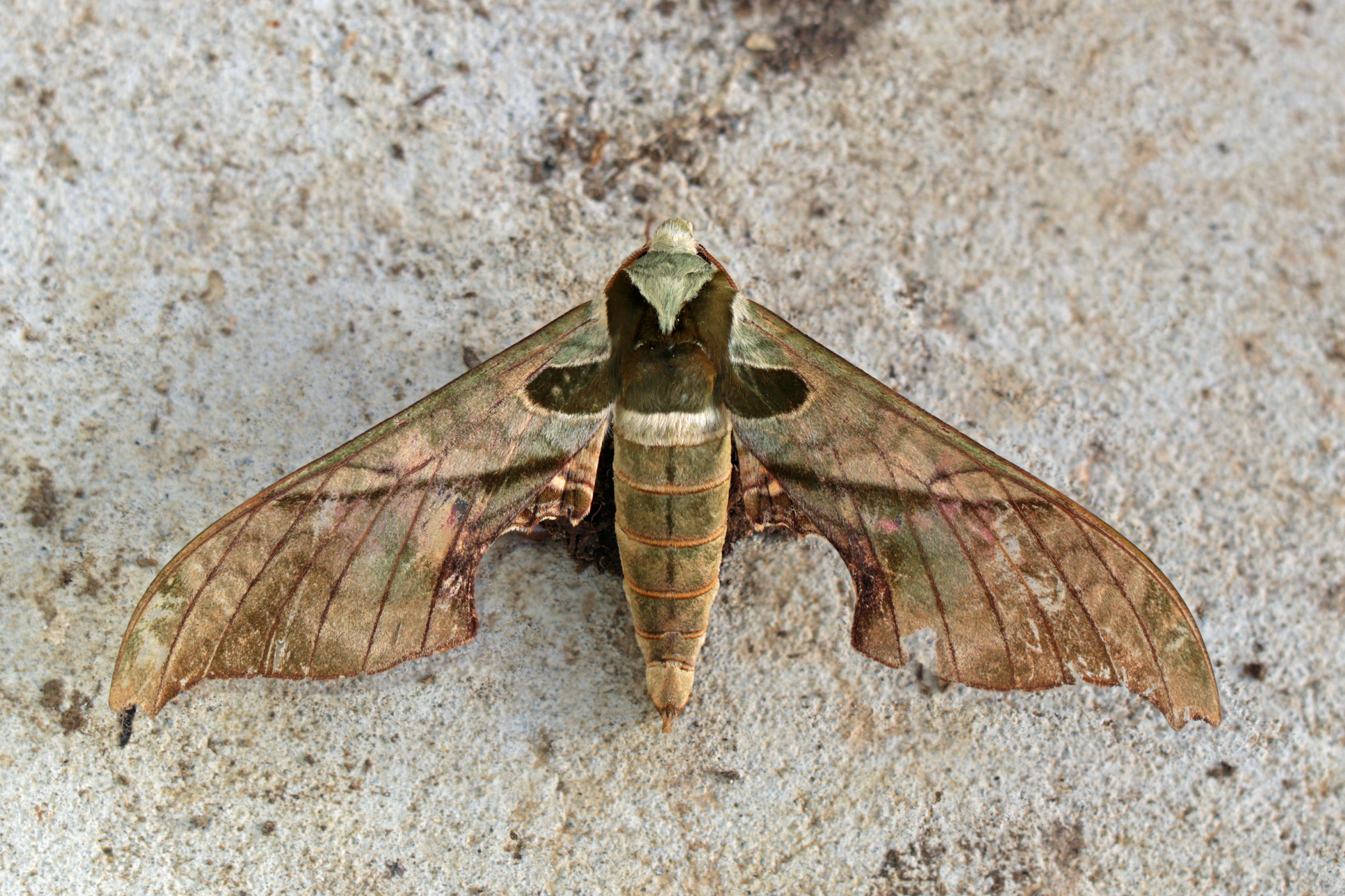
- Male from Mount Totumas cloud forest, Panama

Scientific classification
- Domain: Eukaryota
- Kingdom: Animalia
- Phylum: Arthropoda
- Class: Insecta
- Order: Lepidoptera
- Family: Sphingidae
- Genus: Adhemarius
- Species: A. donysa

Binomial name
- Adhemarius donysa (H. Druce, 1889)

Synonyms
- Ambulyx donysa H. Druce, 1889

= Adhemarius donysa =

Species of moth

Adhemarius donysa is a species of moth in the family Sphingidae. It was described by Herbert Druce in 1889, and is known from Mexico.

== Description ==
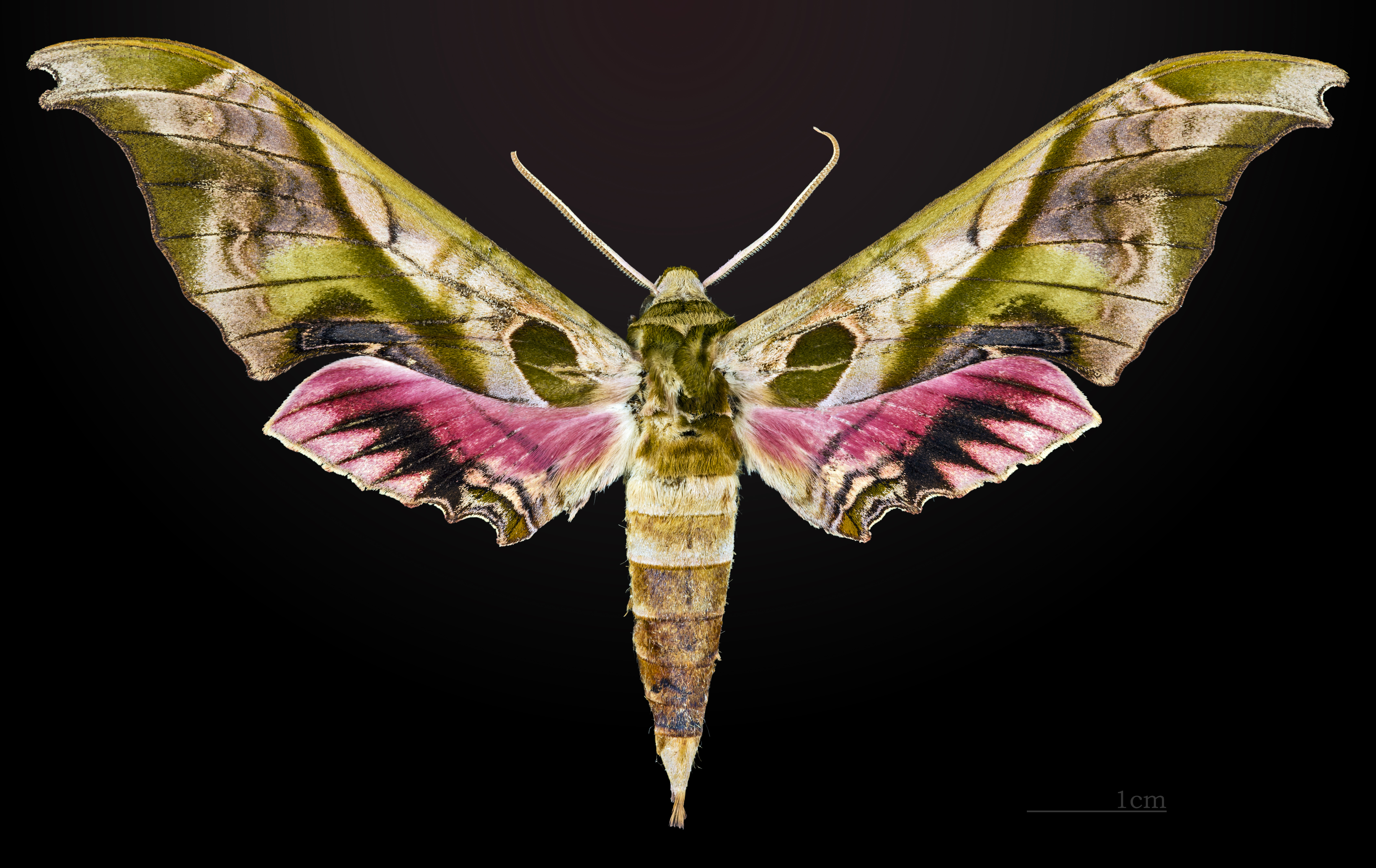
Dorsale male - MHNT

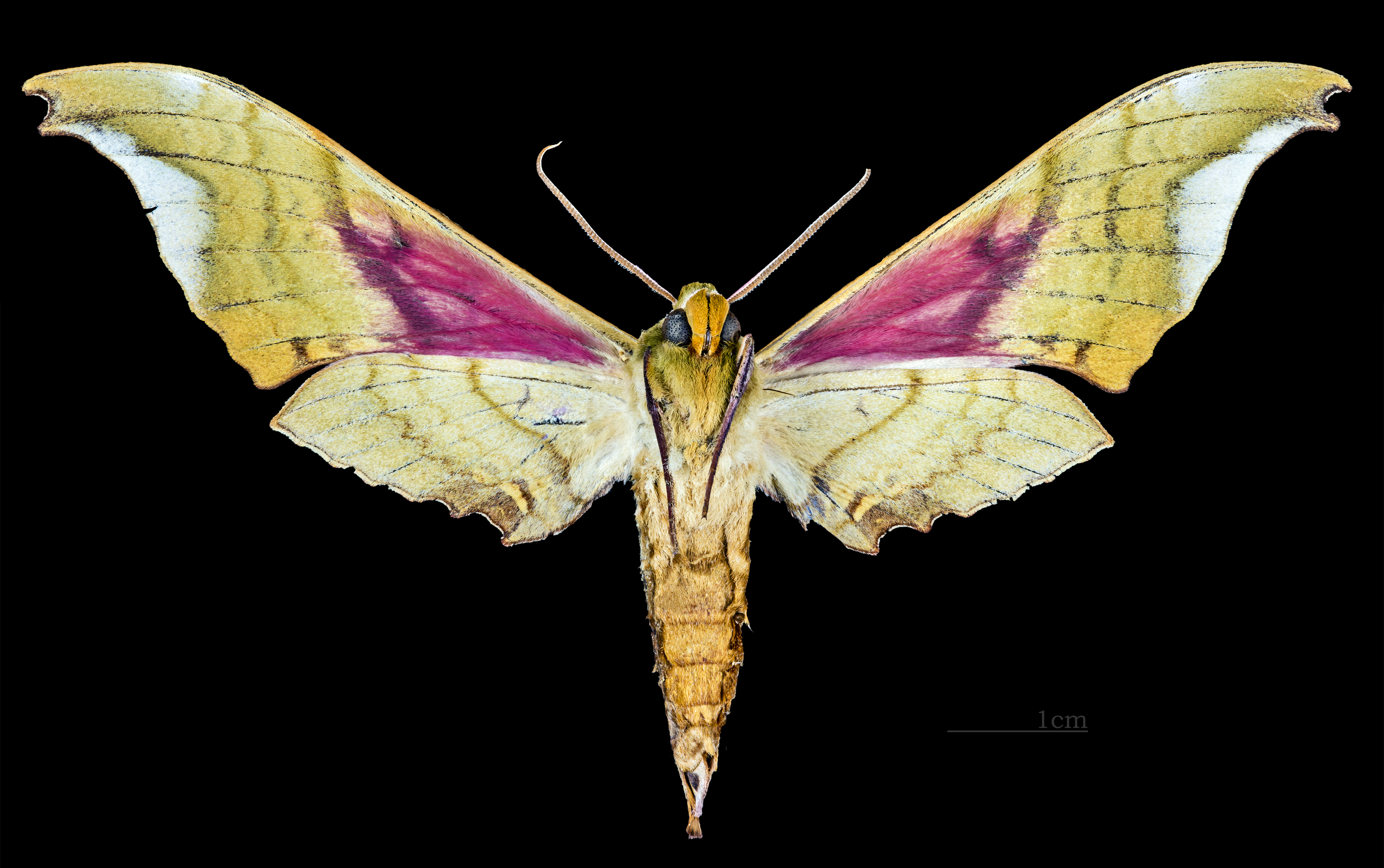
Underside male - MHNT

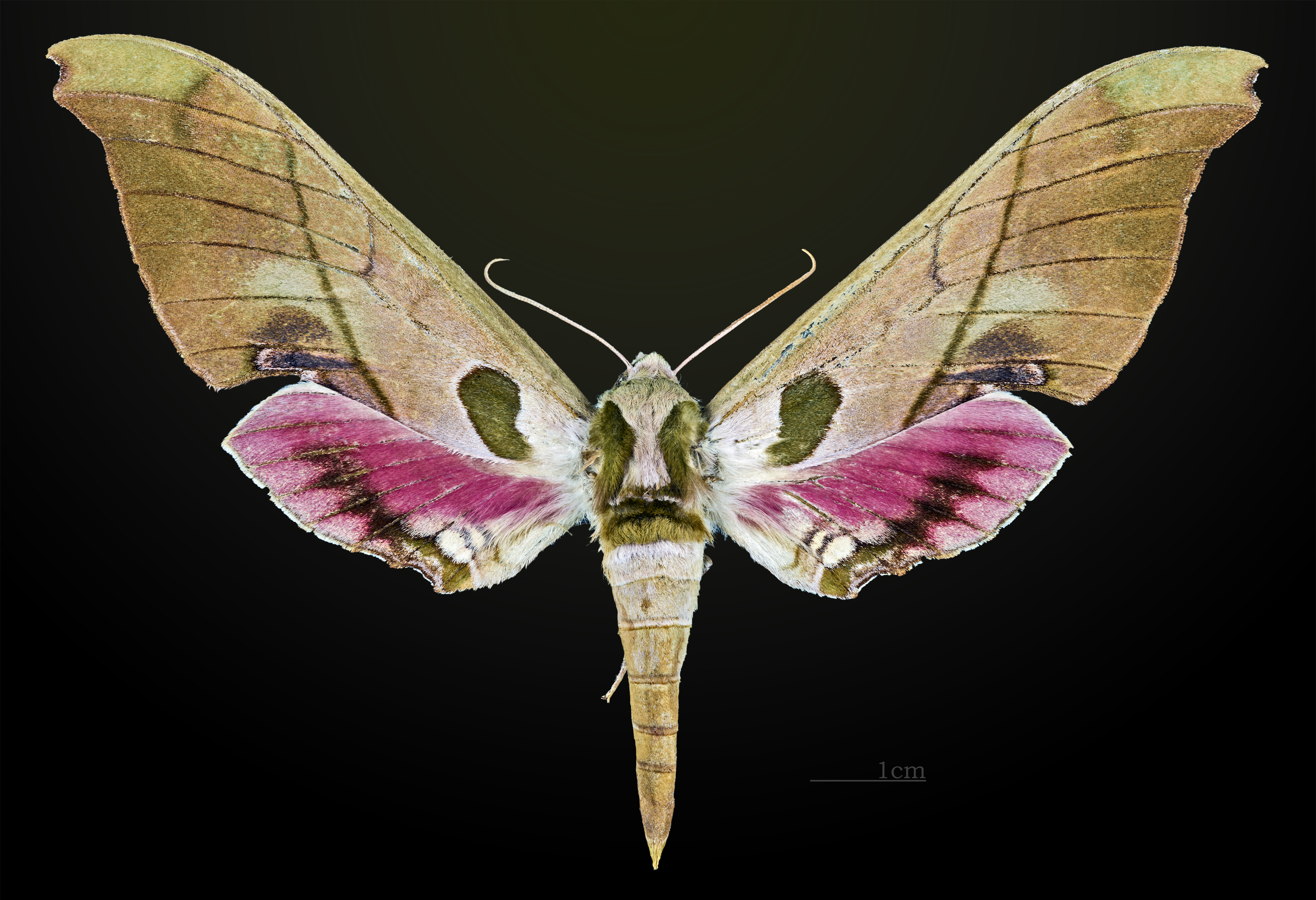
Dorsale female - MHNT

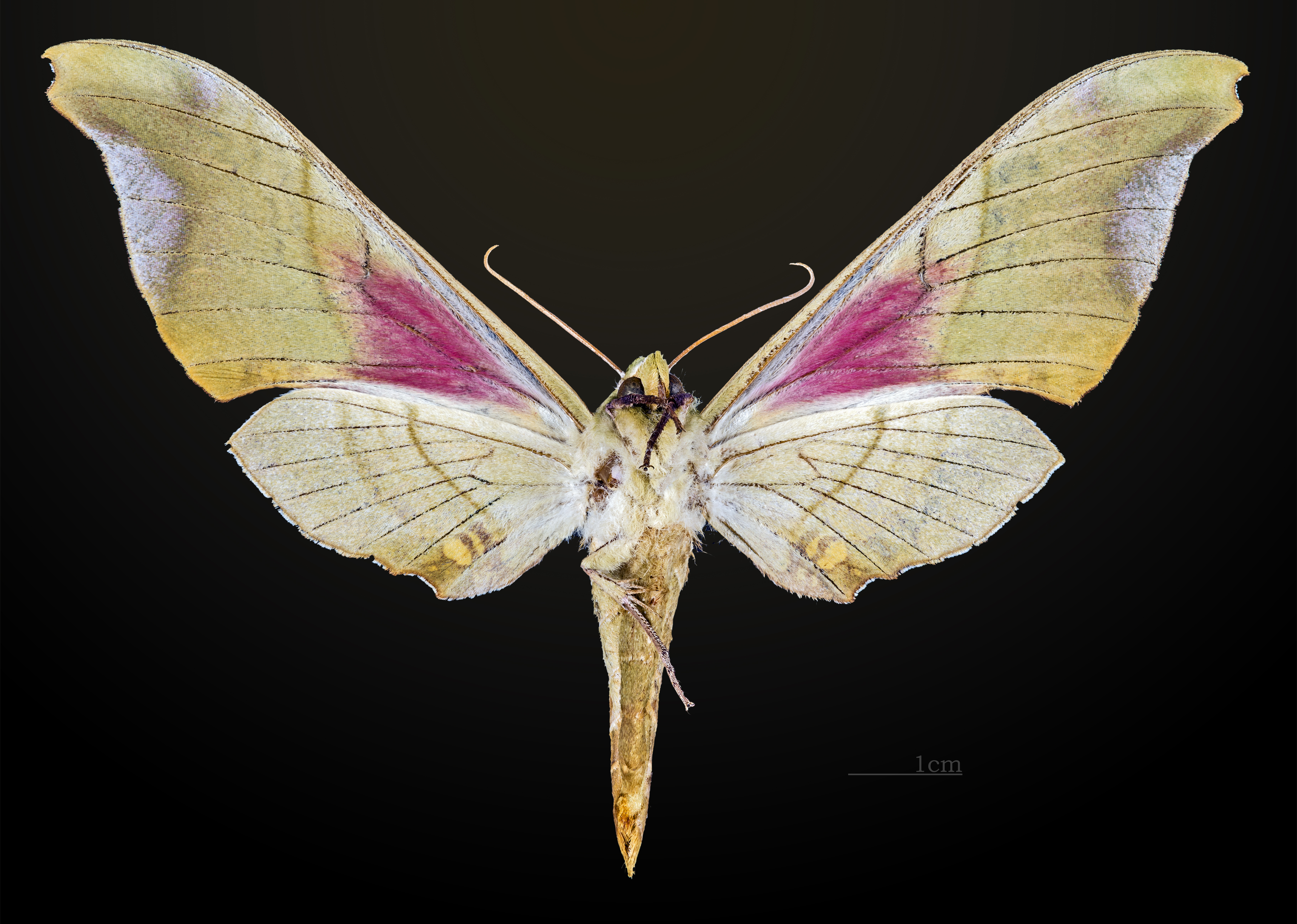
Underside female - MHNT

== Biology ==
There are probably at least two generations per year.
