= Phyllonorycter durangensis =

Scientific classification
- Kingdom: Animalia
- Phylum: Arthropoda
- Class: Insecta
- Order: Lepidoptera
- Family: Gracillariidae
- Genus: Phyllonorycter
- Species: P. durangensis

Binomial name
- Phyllonorycter durangensis Deschka, 1982

Species of moth

Phyllonorycter durangensis is a moth of the family Gracillariidae. It is known from Mexico.

The larvae feed on Alnus species. They mine the leaves of their host plant. The mine has the form of a very small gallery on the underside of the leaf.
