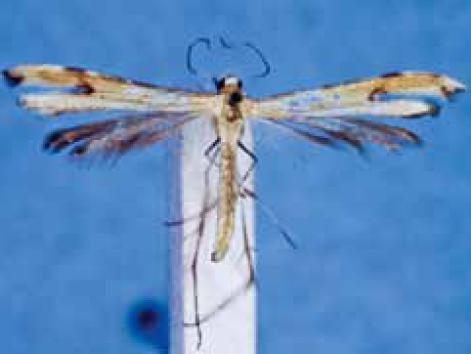

Scientific classification
- Domain: Eukaryota
- Kingdom: Animalia
- Phylum: Arthropoda
- Class: Insecta
- Order: Lepidoptera
- Family: Pterophoridae
- Genus: Hellinsia
- Species: H. tinctus

Binomial name
- Hellinsia tinctus (Walsingham, 1915)

Synonyms
- Pterophorus tinctus Walsingham, 1915; Oidaematophorus tinctus

= Hellinsia tinctus =

Species of moth

Hellinsia tinctus is a moth of the family Pterophoridae. It is found in Arizona and Mexico (including the type location, Guerrero).

The wingspan is about 15 mm. The antennae and palpi are whitish. The head and face are ochreous, but whitish on the crown. The thorax and abdomen are pale ochreous. The forewings are pale ochreous, strongly tinged with brownish ochreous on the costal half, along the cell, and nearly to the apex. On the apical lobe, an obliquely curved reddish-brown spot is found at the base of the fissure, as well as an elongate dark fuscous spot on the costa, above the basal half of the fissure, separated by a pale spot from a few fuscous scales beyond it. There is also a minute blackish spot on the lower edge of the apical lobe. The hindwings and cilia are shining yellowish brown. Adults are on wing in August and September.
