= Pyrausta salvia =

Scientific classification
- Domain: Eukaryota
- Kingdom: Animalia
- Phylum: Arthropoda
- Class: Insecta
- Order: Lepidoptera
- Family: Crambidae
- Genus: Pyrausta
- Species: P. salvia

Binomial name
- Pyrausta salvia (H. Druce, 1895)

Synonyms
- Syllythria salvia H. Druce, 1895

Species of moth

Pyrausta salvia is a moth in the family Crambidae. It was described by Herbert Druce in 1895. It is found in Guerrero, Mexico.
