= Eupithecia lechriotorna =

Scientific classification
- Kingdom: Animalia
- Phylum: Arthropoda
- Class: Insecta
- Order: Lepidoptera
- Family: Geometridae
- Genus: Eupithecia
- Species: E. lechriotorna

Binomial name
- Eupithecia lechriotorna (Dyar, 1922)

Synonyms
- Tephroclystia lechriotorna Dyar, 1922

Species of moth

Eupithecia lechriotorna is a moth in the family Geometridae. It is found in Mexico.
