= Eupithecia sellia =

Scientific classification
- Domain: Eukaryota
- Kingdom: Animalia
- Phylum: Arthropoda
- Class: Insecta
- Order: Lepidoptera
- Family: Geometridae
- Genus: Eupithecia
- Species: E. sellia

Binomial name
- Eupithecia sellia (Warren, 1906)

Synonyms
- Tephroclystia sellia Warren, 1906

Species of moth

Eupithecia sellia is a moth in the family Geometridae. It is found in Mexico.
