= Eupithecia glaucotincta =

Scientific classification
- Kingdom: Animalia
- Phylum: Arthropoda
- Class: Insecta
- Order: Lepidoptera
- Family: Geometridae
- Genus: Eupithecia
- Species: E. glaucotincta

Binomial name
- Eupithecia glaucotincta (Dyar, 1913)

Synonyms
- Tephroclystia glaucotincta Dyar, 1913

Species of moth

Eupithecia glaucotincta is a moth in the family Geometridae. It is found in Mexico.
