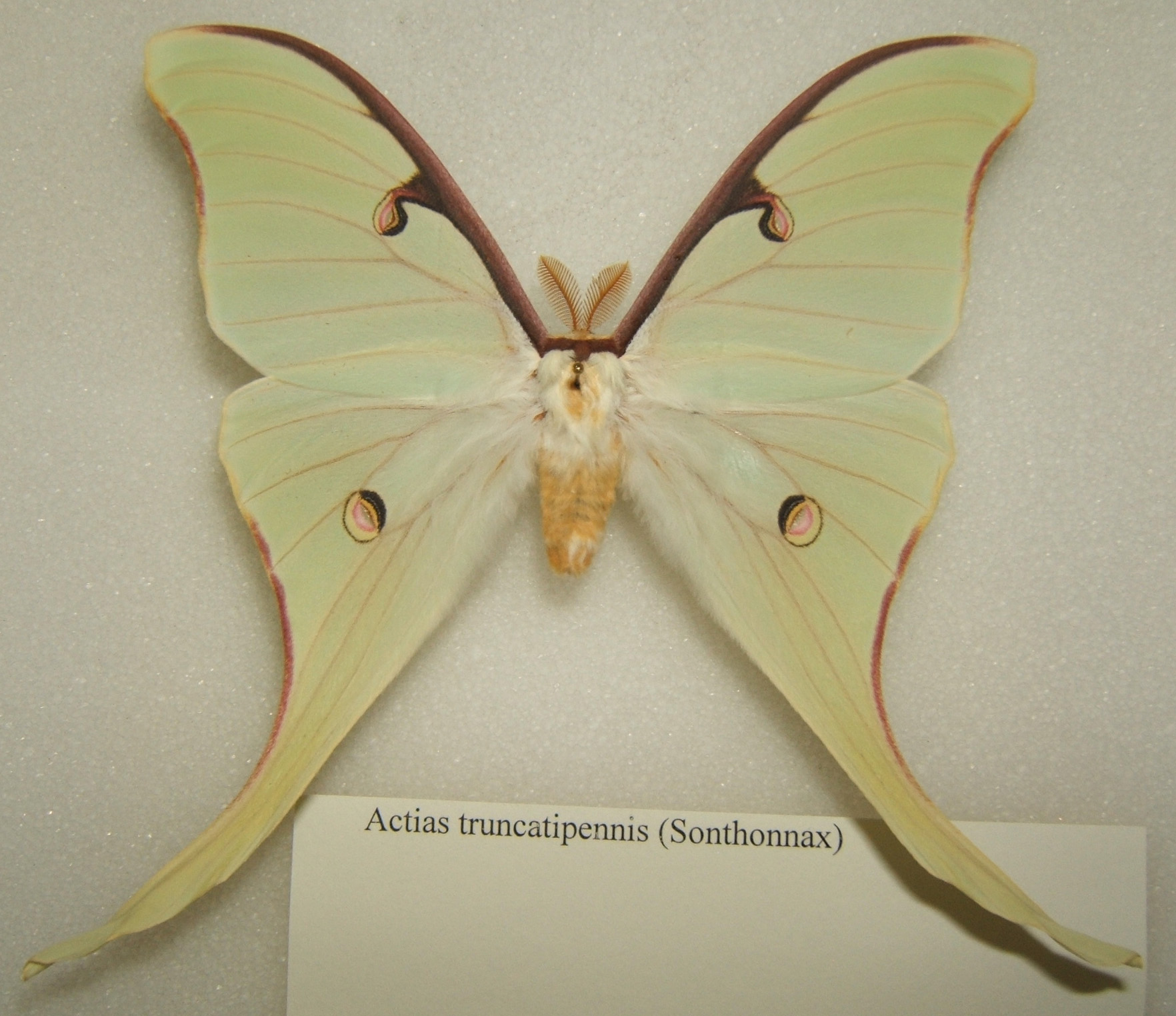
- Male
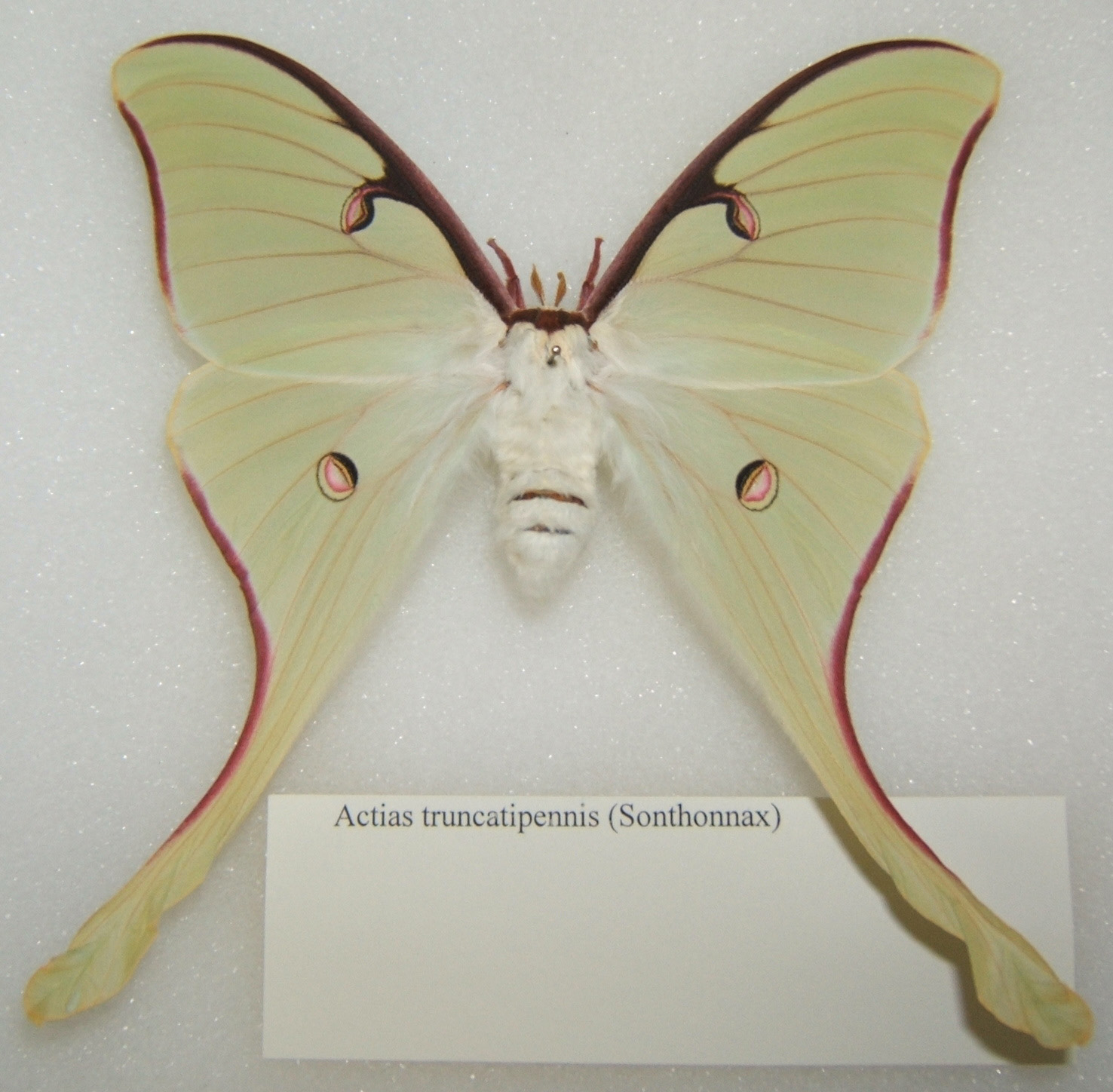
- Female

Scientific classification
- Kingdom: Animalia
- Phylum: Arthropoda
- Class: Insecta
- Order: Lepidoptera
- Family: Saturniidae
- Genus: Actias
- Species: A. truncatipennis

Binomial name
- Actias truncatipennis (Sonthonnax, 1899)

Synonyms
- Tropaea truncatipennis Sonthonnax, 1899

= Actias truncatipennis =

Species of moth

Actias truncatipennis is also known as the Mexican Moon Moth. It is an uncommon moth of the family Saturniidae, potentially the only species of the genus that is found in Mexico. The species was first described by Léon Sonthonnax in 1899.

It resembles the Luna moth but is considerably larger, and the bottom of its forewings are more curved. Larvae appear also almost identical to A. Luna, but are presumably larger.

Additionally, similar to A. Luna, this species has seasonal forms with slightly varying appearance, implying multiple yearly generations. This is shown in the lacking or addition of distinct red-brown edges of the wings, and longer, but more slender tails. This form with colored wing-edges may be the spring form.

== Host plants ==
Sweetgum (Liquidambar Stiraciflua), and a species of Walnut are used as food for larvae in the wild, in Mexico.

== Development and habitat ==
Larvae and adults are found between March to October in the wild. After this time, winter is spent in diapause in the pupal stage.

Development is divided into 5 instars, meaning the larvae shed their skins 4 times, excluding hatching from the egg. This takes remarkably little time, with some reared examples of the species only taking 18 days from hatching to spinning cocoon. Granted, these individuals were reduced in size. Development was possibly sped up due to extreme heat. The cocoon hatch time is typical, with some examples taking around 27 days.

Habitat is concentrated around the higher elevation, cloud forested regions in the south-east of Mexico, in the states of:

- Hidalgo
- Puebla
- Veracruz
- Querétaro
- San Luis Potosí
- Tlaxcala
- Estado de México
- Possibly parts of Morelos and northern Oaxaca

Their population in the wild seems rather stable, although their range is slowly being threatened by logging.

Just as with A. Luna, A. Truncatipennis is able to hybridize with other species of the Genus, and even with Graellsia. This is due to these two's shared evolution on the American continent, and migration there via the Bering Ice Bridge.

== Usage ==
It is reportedly used as a food source for locals of the Sierra Tarahumara and Chihuahua regions in Mexico. Here, the larvae are consumed, and are traditionally called Gusano Gordo or Papalotli.
