= Eupithecia classicata =

Scientific classification
- Domain: Eukaryota
- Kingdom: Animalia
- Phylum: Arthropoda
- Class: Insecta
- Order: Lepidoptera
- Family: Geometridae
- Genus: Eupithecia
- Species: E. classicata

Binomial name
- Eupithecia classicata Pearsall, 1909

Synonyms
- Eucymatoge penumbrata Pearsall, 1912; Eupithecia penumbrata

Species of moth

Eupithecia classicata is a moth in the family Geometridae, first described by Pearsall in 1909. It lives in the US state of Arizona and the Mexican state of Durango. The larvae feed on Arbutus arizonica flowers or leaf buds.
