= Eupithecia westonaria =

Scientific classification
- Domain: Eukaryota
- Kingdom: Animalia
- Phylum: Arthropoda
- Class: Insecta
- Order: Lepidoptera
- Family: Geometridae
- Genus: Eupithecia
- Species: E. westonaria

Binomial name
- Eupithecia westonaria (Warren, 1906)

Synonyms
- Tephroclystia westonaria Warren, 1906

Species of moth

Eupithecia westonaria is a moth in the family Geometridae. It is found in Mexico.

The wingspan is about 16 mm for males and 17 mm for females. The forewings are greenish ocherous, thickly dusted with blackish scales. There are parallel straight dark lines and shades on the hindwings.
