= Aethes tuxtlana =

Scientific classification
- Domain: Eukaryota
- Kingdom: Animalia
- Phylum: Arthropoda
- Class: Insecta
- Order: Lepidoptera
- Family: Tortricidae
- Genus: Aethes
- Species: A. tuxtlana

Binomial name
- Aethes tuxtlana Razowski, 1986

Species of moth

Aethes tuxtlana is a species of moth of the family Tortricidae. It was described by Razowski in 1986. It is found in Chiapas, Mexico.
