= Geitocochylis tarphionima =

Scientific classification
- Kingdom: Animalia
- Phylum: Arthropoda
- Class: Insecta
- Order: Lepidoptera
- Family: Tortricidae
- Genus: Geitocochylis
- Species: G. tarphionima

Binomial name
- Geitocochylis tarphionima Razowski, 1984

Species of moth

Geitocochylis tarphionima is a species of moth of the family Tortricidae. It is endemic to Chihuahua, Mexico.
