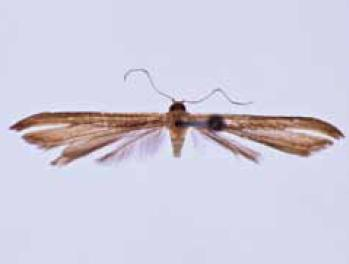

Scientific classification
- Kingdom: Animalia
- Phylum: Arthropoda
- Class: Insecta
- Order: Lepidoptera
- Family: Pterophoridae
- Genus: Hellinsia
- Species: H. socorroica

Binomial name
- Hellinsia socorroica (Gielis, 1991)

Synonyms
- Oidaematophorus socorroica Gielis, 1991

= Hellinsia socorroica =

Species of moth

Hellinsia socorroica is a species of plume moth of the family Pterophoridae. It is found in Mexico (Socorro Island).

Plume moths like Hellinsia socorroica are part of a group of slender moths with distinctive T-shaped wings. The wings resemble plumes or feathers when at rest. There are many species of the genus Hellinsia, some widely distributed.
