= Antaeotricha machetes =

Scientific classification
- Domain: Eukaryota
- Kingdom: Animalia
- Phylum: Arthropoda
- Class: Insecta
- Order: Lepidoptera
- Family: Depressariidae
- Genus: Antaeotricha
- Species: A. machetes

Binomial name
- Antaeotricha machetes (Walsingham, 1912)

Synonyms
- Stenoma machetes Walsingham, 1912

Species of moth

Antaeotricha machetes is a moth in the family Depressariidae. It was described by Lord Walsingham in 1912. It is found in Mexico (Guerrero).

The wingspan is 27–30 mm. The forewings are rather shining, white, with wavy mottled shades of bone-grey, and a strong greyish fuscous spot at the flexus, in which the scales, projecting over the margin, are in part white, but outwardly tawny purplish. The first indistinct mottled shade-line, commencing at the base of the costa, is bent downward at one-fourth, and merged in the more generally diffused bone-grey mottling along and below the fold. Beyond the base the costal area is unshaded, but below it, beyond the middle, are two, more or less confluent, obliquely sinuate shade-lines, directed to the outer end of the fold. These are followed before the termen by two comparatively straight, but slightly outward bowed, parallel shadelines, the first continuous, the second tending to become broken into spots. There is a rather distinct bone-grey marginal line around the apex and termen, followed by a series of about seven dark fuscous spots in the white cilia, which are also tipped with bone-grey. The hindwings are brown-grey.
