= Epicrisias =

Scientific classification
- Kingdom: Animalia
- Phylum: Arthropoda
- Class: Insecta
- Order: Lepidoptera
- Superfamily: Noctuoidea
- Family: Erebidae
- Subfamily: Arctiinae
- Genus: Epicrisias; Dyar, 1912
- Species: E. eschara

Binomial name
- Epicrisias eschara Dyar, 1912

Genus of moths

Epicrisias is a monotypic moth genus in the family Erebidae. Its only species, Epicrisias eschara, is found in Mexico. Both the genus and species were first described by Harrison Gray Dyar Jr. in 1912.
