= Antaeotricha frontalis =

Scientific classification
- Kingdom: Animalia
- Phylum: Arthropoda
- Clade: Pancrustacea
- Class: Insecta
- Order: Lepidoptera
- Family: Depressariidae
- Genus: Antaeotricha
- Species: A. frontalis

Binomial name
- Antaeotricha frontalis (Zeller, 1855)

Synonyms
- Cryptolechia frontalis Zeller, 1855

Species of moth

Antaeotricha frontalis is a moth in the family Depressariidae. It was described by Philipp Christoph Zeller in 1855. It is found in Mexico and Guatemala.
