= Scopula cavana =

Scientific classification
- Domain: Eukaryota
- Kingdom: Animalia
- Phylum: Arthropoda
- Class: Insecta
- Order: Lepidoptera
- Family: Geometridae
- Genus: Scopula
- Species: S. cavana

Binomial name
- Scopula cavana (H. H. Druce, 1892)

Synonyms
- Acidalia cavana H. H. Druce, 1892

Species of geometer moth in subfamily Sterrhinae

Scopula cavana is a moth of the family Geometridae. It was described by Hamilton Herbert Druce in 1892. It is found in Mexico.
