= Eupithecia muscula =

Scientific classification
- Domain: Eukaryota
- Kingdom: Animalia
- Phylum: Arthropoda
- Class: Insecta
- Order: Lepidoptera
- Family: Geometridae
- Genus: Eupithecia
- Species: E. muscula

Binomial name
- Eupithecia muscula (Bastelberger, 1907)

Synonyms
- Tephroclystia muscula Bastelberger, 1907

Species of moth

Eupithecia muscula is a moth in the family Geometridae. It is found in Mexico.
