= Eupithecia consors =

Scientific classification
- Domain: Eukaryota
- Kingdom: Animalia
- Phylum: Arthropoda
- Class: Insecta
- Order: Lepidoptera
- Family: Geometridae
- Genus: Eupithecia
- Species: E. consors

Binomial name
- Eupithecia consors (Warren, 1900)

Synonyms
- Tephroclystia consors Warren, 1900

Species of moth

Eupithecia consors is a moth in the family Geometridae. It is found in Mexico.
