= Eupithecia magnifacta =

Scientific classification
- Domain: Eukaryota
- Kingdom: Animalia
- Phylum: Arthropoda
- Class: Insecta
- Order: Lepidoptera
- Family: Geometridae
- Genus: Eupithecia
- Species: E. magnifacta

Binomial name
- Eupithecia magnifacta (Dyar, 1914)

Synonyms
- Tephroclystia magnifacta Dyar, 1914

Species of moth

Eupithecia magnifacta is a moth in the family Geometridae. It is found in Mexico.
