= Antaeotricha elaeodes =

Scientific classification
- Kingdom: Animalia
- Phylum: Arthropoda
- Clade: Pancrustacea
- Class: Insecta
- Order: Lepidoptera
- Family: Depressariidae
- Genus: Antaeotricha
- Species: A. elaeodes

Binomial name
- Antaeotricha elaeodes (Walsingham, 1913)

Synonyms
- Stenoma elaeodes Walsingham, 1913

Species of moth

Antaeotricha elaeodes is a moth in the family Depressariidae. It was described by Lord Walsingham in 1913. It is found in Mexico (Vera Cruz).

The wingspan is about 25 mm. The forewings are dark olive-grey, with a greenish wash especially along the costal half and terminal third. The costa is narrowly edged with tawny brown beneath which is a slight lilac reflection. At the lower angle of the cell is a single round white dot. The hindwings are bronzy brownish.
