= Scopula vittora =

Scientific classification
- Domain: Eukaryota
- Kingdom: Animalia
- Phylum: Arthropoda
- Class: Insecta
- Order: Lepidoptera
- Family: Geometridae
- Genus: Scopula
- Species: S. vittora

Binomial name
- Scopula vittora (Schaus, 1901)

Synonyms
- Craspedia vittora Schaus, 1901

Species of geometer moth in subfamily Sterrhinae

Scopula vittora is a moth of the family Geometridae. It is found in Mexico.
