= Scopula ordinaria =

Scientific classification
- Kingdom: Animalia
- Phylum: Arthropoda
- Class: Insecta
- Order: Lepidoptera
- Family: Geometridae
- Genus: Scopula
- Species: S. ordinaria

Binomial name
- Scopula ordinaria (Dyar, 1912)

Synonyms
- Emmiltis ordinaria Dyar, 1912

Species of geometer moth in subfamily Sterrhinae

Scopula ordinaria is a moth of the family Geometridae. It was described by Harrison Gray Dyar Jr. in 1912. It is endemic to Mexico.
