= Antaeotricha ceratistes =

Scientific classification
- Domain: Eukaryota
- Kingdom: Animalia
- Phylum: Arthropoda
- Class: Insecta
- Order: Lepidoptera
- Family: Depressariidae
- Genus: Antaeotricha
- Species: A. ceratistes

Binomial name
- Antaeotricha ceratistes (Walsingham, 1912)

Synonyms
- Stenoma ceratistes Walsingham, 1912

Species of moth

Antaeotricha ceratistes is a moth in the family Depressariidae. It was described by Lord Walsingham in 1912. It is found in Mexico (Guerrero).

The wingspan is 19–21 mm. The forewings are pale fawn-grey, with a slight brownish tinge, the costal third dirty whitish, widening outwardly to the middle of the termen, but traversed by diffused lines of pale fawn-brownish scales, following the neuration beyond the end of the cell. At the end of the cell is a small brownish fuscous spot, a narrow elongate spot of the same color placed in the middle of the fold, and a faint indication of two or three brownish fuscous dots on the lower part of the termen. The hindwings are very pale brownish grey, with a tuft of long ochreous hair-scales near the base of the costa on the upperside in the males.
