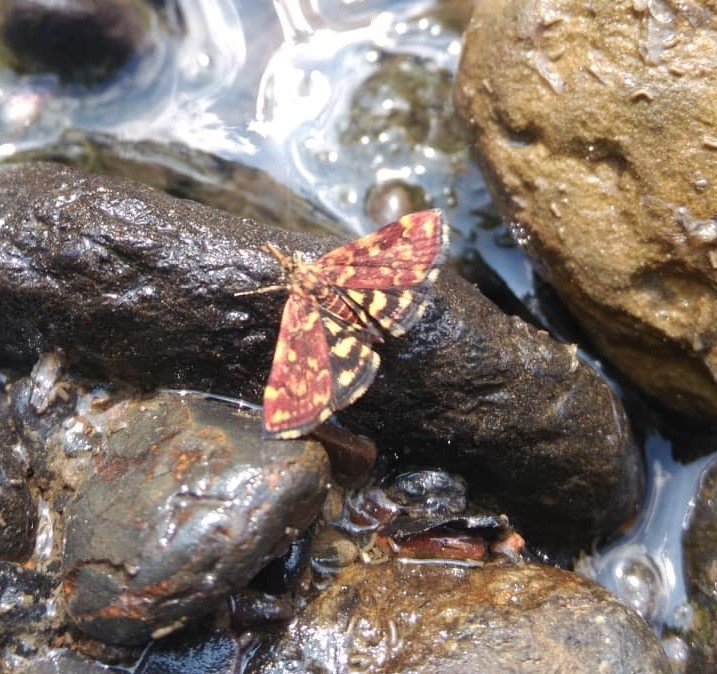

Scientific classification
- Kingdom: Animalia
- Phylum: Arthropoda
- Class: Insecta
- Order: Lepidoptera
- Family: Crambidae
- Genus: Pyrausta
- Species: P. trizonalis

Binomial name
- Pyrausta trizonalis Hampson, 1899

= Pyrausta trizonalis =

Species of moth

Pyrausta trizonalis is a moth in the family Crambidae described by George Hampson in 1899. It is found in Orizaba, Mexico.

The wingspan is about 16 mm. The forewings of the males are blackish, tinged with red. There is a diffuse orange antemedial band. The hindwings are black, with an orange subbasal band, as well as orange medial and subterminal bands. The forewings of the females are suffused with rufous and the orange and black markings are blurred and ill defined.
