= Phyllonorycter acanthus =

Scientific classification
- Kingdom: Animalia
- Phylum: Arthropoda
- Class: Insecta
- Order: Lepidoptera
- Family: Gracillariidae
- Genus: Phyllonorycter
- Species: P. acanthus

Binomial name
- Phyllonorycter acanthus Davis & Deschka, 2001

Species of moth

Phyllonorycter acanthus is a moth of the family Gracillariidae. It is found in scattered riparian habitats in otherwise generally arid, montane regions of the Trans-Mexican Volcanic Belt of Jalisco and Michoacán in Mexico.

The length of the forewings is 2.7–3.6 mm. Adults are on wing in August in one generation.

The larvae mostly feed on Salix bonplandiana mining the leaves of their host plant.
