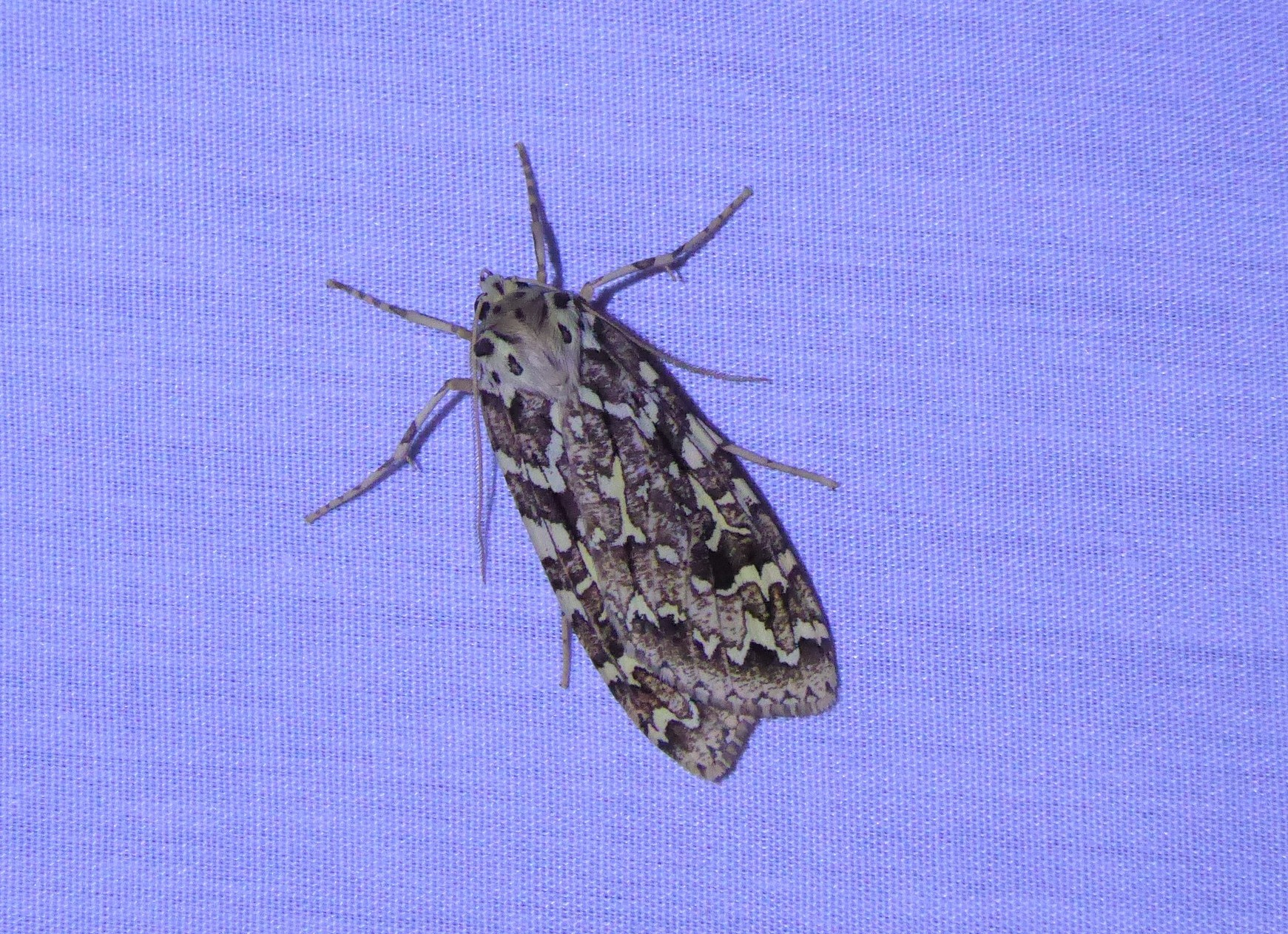
- Phaegoptera decrepida

Scientific classification
- Domain: Eukaryota
- Kingdom: Animalia
- Phylum: Arthropoda
- Class: Insecta
- Order: Lepidoptera
- Superfamily: Noctuoidea
- Family: Erebidae
- Subfamily: Arctiinae
- Subtribe: Phaegopterina
- Genus: Phaegoptera; Herrich-Schäffer, [1853]

= Phaegoptera =

Genus of moths

Phaegoptera is a genus of moths in the family Erebidae. The genus was proposed by Gottlieb August Wilhelm Herrich-Schäffer in 1853.

== Species ==
- Phaegoptera albescens Travassos, 1955
- Phaegoptera albimacula (E. D. Jones, 1908)
- Phaegoptera alipioi Travassos, 1955
- Phaegoptera chorima Schaus, 1896
- Phaegoptera decrepida (Herrich-Schäffer, [1855])
- Phaegoptera decrepidoides (Rothschild, 1909)
- Phaegoptera depicta (Herrich-Schäffer, [1855])
- Phaegoptera discisema (Hampson, 1916)
- Phaegoptera fasciatus (Rothschild, 1909)
- Phaegoptera flavopunctata (Herrich-Schäffer, [1855])
- Phaegoptera flavostrigata (Herrich-Schäffer, [1855])
- Phaegoptera fusca Travassos, 1955
- Phaegoptera granifera Schaus, 1892
- Phaegoptera hampsoni (Rothschild, 1909)
- Phaegoptera histrionica Herrich-Schäffer, [1853]
- Phaegoptera irregularis (Rothschild, 1916)
- Phaegoptera medionigra (Reich, 1934)
- Phaegoptera nexa (Herrich-Schäffer, [1855])
- Phaegoptera ochracea Joicey & Talbot, 1918
- Phaegoptera pseudocatenata Travassos, 1955
- Phaegoptera pulchra Travassos, 1955
- Phaegoptera punctularis (Herrich-Schäffer, [1855])
- Phaegoptera schaefferi (Schaus, 1892)
- Phaegoptera sestia (Druce, 1906)

== Former species ==
- Phaegoptera picturata (Burmeister, 1878)
- Phaegoptera superba (Druce, 1911)
