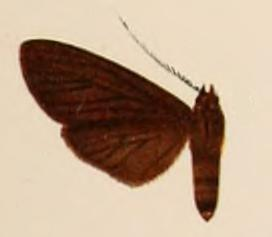
- Pelochyta atra

Scientific classification
- Kingdom: Animalia
- Phylum: Arthropoda
- Clade: Pancrustacea
- Class: Insecta
- Order: Lepidoptera
- Superfamily: Noctuoidea
- Family: Erebidae
- Subfamily: Arctiinae
- Tribe: Arctiini
- Subtribe: Phaegopterina
- Genus: Pelochyta; Hübner, [1819]

Synonyms
- Sontia Walker, 1856

= Pelochyta =

Genus of moths

Pelochyta is a genus of moths in the family Erebidae. The species was first described by Jacob Hübner in 1819. They are found in Africa, as well as throughout India, Myanmar, Sri Lanka, Australia, and New Britain.

== Description ==
Its palpi are correctly upturned and slender. Its antennae are nearly simple. The forewing has an arched costa. The outer margin is obliquely curved. Veins 3 to 5 from angle of cell. Vein 6 from below upper angle. Veins 7 to 9 are stalked. Vein 10 from cell. Hindwings have an anal angle. Its outer margin is nearly straight. Its apex is slightly acute.

== Species ==
- Pelochyta acuta Toulgoët, 1984
- Pelochyta adumbrata Dognin, 1922
- Pelochyta affinis Rothschild, 1909
- Pelochyta albipars (Hampson, 1914)
- Pelochyta albotestaceus (Rothschild, 1909)
- Pelochyta aliena (Maassen, 1890)
- Pelochyta arenacea (Schaus, 1901)
- Pelochyta arontes (Stoll, [1782])
- Pelochyta atra Rothschild, 1909
- Pelochyta bicolor Rothschild, 1909
- Pelochyta brunnescens Rothschild, 1909
- Pelochyta cervina (H. Edwards, 1884)
- Pelochyta cinerea (Walker, 1855)
- Pelochyta colombiana (Rothschild, 1916)
- Pelochyta dorsicincta Hampson, 1916
- Pelochyta draudti (Seitz, 1922)
- Pelochyta fassli Rothschild, 1911
- Pelochyta fergusoni Watson & Goodger, 1986
- Pelochyta gandolfii Schaus, 1933
- Pelochyta haemapleura Dognin, 1914
- Pelochyta joseensis Strand, 1921
- Pelochyta misera Schaus, 1911
- Pelochyta nigrescens (Dognin, 1891)
- Pelochyta pallida (Schaus, 1901)
- Pelochyta propinqua Toulgoët, 1984
- Pelochyta ruficollis (Druce, 1884)
- Pelochyta semivitrea (Dognin, 1907)
- Pelochyta songoa Schaus, 1933
- Pelochyta spitzi Rothschild, 1933
- Pelochyta umbrata Hampson, 1901

== Former species ==
- Pelochyta nabor Schaus, 1924
