= Pelochyta albipars =

Scientific classification
- Kingdom: Animalia
- Phylum: Arthropoda
- Class: Insecta
- Order: Lepidoptera
- Superfamily: Noctuoidea
- Family: Erebidae
- Subfamily: Arctiinae
- Genus: Pelochyta
- Species: P. albipars

Binomial name
- Pelochyta albipars (Hampson, 1916)

Species of moth

Pelochyta albipars is a moth of the family Erebidae. It was described by George Hampson in 1914. It is found in Peru, and French Guiana.
