= Elysius discopunctata =

Scientific classification
- Domain: Eukaryota
- Kingdom: Animalia
- Phylum: Arthropoda
- Class: Insecta
- Order: Lepidoptera
- Superfamily: Noctuoidea
- Family: Erebidae
- Subfamily: Arctiinae
- Genus: Elysius
- Species: E. discopunctata

Binomial name
- Elysius discopunctata Gaede, 1923

Synonyms
- Elysius joiceyi Talbot, 1928

Species of moth

Elysius discopunctata is a moth of the family Erebidae. It was described by Max Gaede in 1923. It is found in Brazil.
