= Pelochyta colombiana =

Scientific classification
- Domain: Eukaryota
- Kingdom: Animalia
- Phylum: Arthropoda
- Class: Insecta
- Order: Lepidoptera
- Superfamily: Noctuoidea
- Family: Erebidae
- Subfamily: Arctiinae
- Genus: Pelochyta
- Species: P. colombiana

Binomial name
- Pelochyta colombiana (Rothschild, 1916)

Synonyms
- Opharus colombiana Rothschild, 1916

Species of moth

Pelochyta colombiana is a moth of the family Erebidae. It was described by Walter Rothschild in 1916. It is found in Colombia.
