= Pelochyta draudti =

Scientific classification
- Domain: Eukaryota
- Kingdom: Animalia
- Phylum: Arthropoda
- Class: Insecta
- Order: Lepidoptera
- Superfamily: Noctuoidea
- Family: Erebidae
- Subfamily: Arctiinae
- Genus: Pelochyta
- Species: P. draudti

Binomial name
- Pelochyta draudti (Seitz, 1922)

Synonyms
- Opharus draudti Seitz, 1922

Species of moth

Pelochyta draudti is a moth of the family Erebidae. It was described by Adalbert Seitz in 1922. It is found in Mexico and French Guiana.
