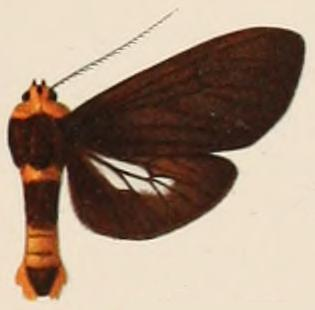

Scientific classification
- Domain: Eukaryota
- Kingdom: Animalia
- Phylum: Arthropoda
- Class: Insecta
- Order: Lepidoptera
- Superfamily: Noctuoidea
- Family: Erebidae
- Subfamily: Arctiinae
- Genus: Elysius
- Species: E. felderi

Binomial name
- Elysius felderi Rothschild, 1909

= Elysius felderi =

Species of moth

Elysius felderi is a moth of the family Erebidae first described by Walter Rothschild in 1909. It is found in Peru.
