= Opharus insulsa =

Scientific classification
- Domain: Eukaryota
- Kingdom: Animalia
- Phylum: Arthropoda
- Class: Insecta
- Order: Lepidoptera
- Superfamily: Noctuoidea
- Family: Erebidae
- Subfamily: Arctiinae
- Genus: Opharus
- Species: O. insulsa

Binomial name
- Opharus insulsa (Dognin, 1902)

Synonyms
- Elysius insulsa Dognin, 1902

Species of moth

Opharus insulsa is a moth of the family Erebidae. It was described by Paul Dognin in 1902. It is found in Ecuador.
