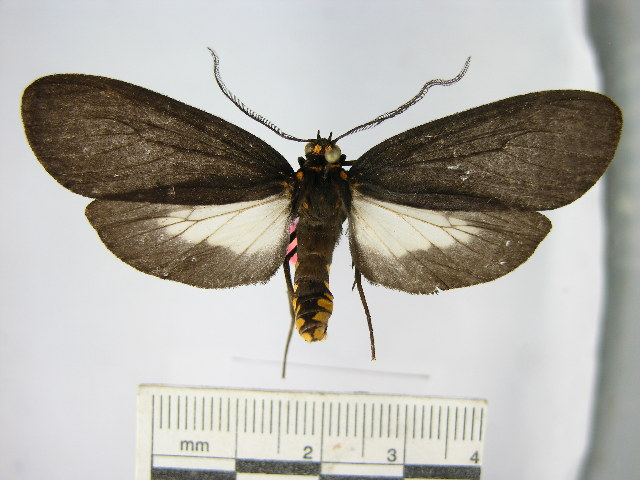

Scientific classification
- Domain: Eukaryota
- Kingdom: Animalia
- Phylum: Arthropoda
- Class: Insecta
- Order: Lepidoptera
- Superfamily: Noctuoidea
- Family: Erebidae
- Subfamily: Arctiinae
- Genus: Elysius
- Species: E. chimaera

Binomial name
- Elysius chimaera (H. Druce, 1893)

Synonyms
- Phaegoptera chimaera H. Druce, 1893; Calidota hadesia Schaus, 1927

= Elysius chimaera =

Species of moth

Elysius chimaera is a moth of the family Erebidae. It was described by Herbert Druce in 1893. It is found in southern Brazil and Paraguay.
