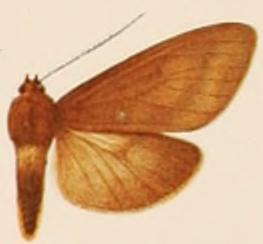
- Elysius castanea

Scientific classification
- Domain: Eukaryota
- Kingdom: Animalia
- Phylum: Arthropoda
- Class: Insecta
- Order: Lepidoptera
- Superfamily: Noctuoidea
- Family: Erebidae
- Subfamily: Arctiinae
- Subtribe: Phaegopterina
- Genus: Elysius; Walker, 1855

= Elysius (moth) =

Genus of moths

Elysius is a genus of moths in the family Erebidae. The genus was erected by Francis Walker in 1855.

== Species ==
- Elysius amapaensis Régo Barros, 1971
- Elysius anomala Jörgensen, 1935
- Elysius atrata (Felder & Rogenhofer, 1874)
- Elysius atrobrunnea Rothschild, 1909
- Elysius barnesi Schaus, 1904
- Elysius carbonarius (Dognin, 1891)
- Elysius castanea Rothschild, 1909
- Elysius chimaera (H. Druce, 1893)
- Elysius cingulata (Walker, 1856)
- Elysius conjunctus Rothschild, 1910
- Elysius conspersus Walker, 1855
- Elysius deceptura (H. Druce, 1905)
- Elysius disciplaga (Walker, 1856)
- Elysius discopunctata Gaede, 1923
- Elysius felderi Rothschild, 1909
- Elysius flavoabdominalis Rothschild, 1935
- Elysius gladysia Schaus, 1920
- Elysius hades (H. Druce, 1906)
- Elysius hampsoni Dognin, 1907
- Elysius hermia (Cramer, [1777])
- Elysius intensa Rothschild, 1935
- Elysius intensus Rothschild, 1910
- Elysius itaunensis Régo Barros, 1971
- Elysius jonesi Rothschild, 1910
- Elysius lavinia H. Druce, 1906
- Elysius melaleuca (Felder, 1874)
- Elysius melanoplaga Hampson, 1901
- Elysius meridionalis Rothschild, 1917
- Elysius ochrota Hampson, 1901
- Elysius ordinaria (Schaus, 1894)
- Elysius phantasma Schaus, 1905
- Elysius pretiosa Jörgensen, 1935
- Elysius proba (Schaus, 1892)
- Elysius pyrosticta Hampson, 1905
- Elysius rabusculum (Dognin, 1905)
- Elysius ruffin Schaus, 1924
- Elysius sebrus (H. Druce, 1899)
- Elysius subterra Rothschild, 1917
- Elysius superba (H. Druce, 1884)
- Elysius systron Schaus, 1904
- Elysius terra H. Druce, 1906
- Elysius terraoides Rothschild, 1909
- Elysius thrailkilli (Schaus, 1892)
