= Opharus laudia =

Scientific classification
- Domain: Eukaryota
- Kingdom: Animalia
- Phylum: Arthropoda
- Class: Insecta
- Order: Lepidoptera
- Superfamily: Noctuoidea
- Family: Erebidae
- Subfamily: Arctiinae
- Genus: Opharus
- Species: O. laudia

Binomial name
- Opharus laudia (H. Druce, 1890)

Synonyms
- Phaegoptera laudia H. Druce, 1890

Species of moth

Opharus laudia is a moth of the family Erebidae. It was described by Herbert Druce in 1890. It is found in Trinidad and Venezuela.
