= Elysius meridionalis =

Scientific classification
- Domain: Eukaryota
- Kingdom: Animalia
- Phylum: Arthropoda
- Class: Insecta
- Order: Lepidoptera
- Superfamily: Noctuoidea
- Family: Erebidae
- Subfamily: Arctiinae
- Genus: Elysius
- Species: E. meridionalis

Binomial name
- Elysius meridionalis Rothschild, 1917

Species of moth

Elysius meridionalis is a moth of the family Erebidae. It was described by Walter Rothschild in 1917. It is found in Brazil.
