= Opharus nigrocinctus =

Scientific classification
- Domain: Eukaryota
- Kingdom: Animalia
- Phylum: Arthropoda
- Class: Insecta
- Order: Lepidoptera
- Superfamily: Noctuoidea
- Family: Erebidae
- Subfamily: Arctiinae
- Genus: Opharus
- Species: O. nigrocinctus

Binomial name
- Opharus nigrocinctus Rothschild, 1935

Species of moth

Opharus nigrocinctus is a moth of the family Erebidae. It was described by Walter Rothschild in 1935. It is found in the Brazilian states of Rio Grande do Sul and Santa Catarina.
