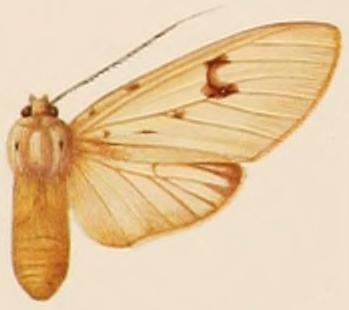

Scientific classification
- Domain: Eukaryota
- Kingdom: Animalia
- Phylum: Arthropoda
- Class: Insecta
- Order: Lepidoptera
- Superfamily: Noctuoidea
- Family: Erebidae
- Subfamily: Arctiinae
- Genus: Pelochyta
- Species: P. albotestaceus

Binomial name
- Pelochyta albotestaceus (Rothschild, 1909)

Synonyms
- Opharus albotestaceus Rothschild, 1909

= Pelochyta albotestaceus =

Species of moth

Pelochyta albotestaceus is a moth of the family Erebidae first described by Walter Rothschild in 1909. It is found in Venezuela.
