= Opharus calosoma =

Scientific classification
- Kingdom: Animalia
- Phylum: Arthropoda
- Class: Insecta
- Order: Lepidoptera
- Superfamily: Noctuoidea
- Family: Erebidae
- Subfamily: Arctiinae
- Genus: Opharus
- Species: O. calosoma

Binomial name
- Opharus calosoma (Dyar, 1913)

Synonyms
- Calidota calosoma Dyar, 1913

Species of moth

Opharus calosoma is a moth of the family Erebidae. It was described by Harrison Gray Dyar Jr. in 1913. It is found in Mexico.
