= Opharus bipunctatus =

Scientific classification
- Domain: Eukaryota
- Kingdom: Animalia
- Phylum: Arthropoda
- Class: Insecta
- Order: Lepidoptera
- Superfamily: Noctuoidea
- Family: Erebidae
- Subfamily: Arctiinae
- Genus: Opharus
- Species: O. bipunctatus

Binomial name
- Opharus bipunctatus Vincent & Laguerre, 2009

Species of moth

Opharus bipunctatus is a moth of the family Erebidae. It was described by Vincent and Laguerre in 2009. It is found in the Dominican Republic.
