= Opharus trama =

Scientific classification
- Domain: Eukaryota
- Kingdom: Animalia
- Phylum: Arthropoda
- Class: Insecta
- Order: Lepidoptera
- Superfamily: Noctuoidea
- Family: Erebidae
- Subfamily: Arctiinae
- Genus: Opharus
- Species: O. trama

Binomial name
- Opharus trama (Dognin, 1894)

Synonyms
- Pseudopistosia trama Dognin, 1894; Opharus euripides Druce, 1900

Species of moth

Opharus trama is a moth of the family Erebidae. It was described by Paul Dognin in 1894. It is found in Colombia, Bolivia and Ecuador.
