= Pelochyta umbrata =

Scientific classification
- Kingdom: Animalia
- Phylum: Arthropoda
- Class: Insecta
- Order: Lepidoptera
- Superfamily: Noctuoidea
- Family: Erebidae
- Subfamily: Arctiinae
- Genus: Pelochyta
- Species: P. umbrata

Binomial name
- Pelochyta umbrata Hampson, 1901

Species of moth

Pelochyta umbrata is a moth of the family Erebidae. It was described by George Hampson in 1901. It is found in Bolivia.
