= Phaegoptera chorima =

Scientific classification
- Domain: Eukaryota
- Kingdom: Animalia
- Phylum: Arthropoda
- Class: Insecta
- Order: Lepidoptera
- Superfamily: Noctuoidea
- Family: Erebidae
- Subfamily: Arctiinae
- Genus: Phaegoptera
- Species: P. chorima

Binomial name
- Phaegoptera chorima Schaus, 1896

Synonyms
- Opharus catharinae Rothschild, 1917

Species of moth

Phaegoptera chorima is a moth of the family Erebidae. It was described by William Schaus in 1896. It is found in southern Brazil.
