= Elysius amapaensis =

Scientific classification
- Domain: Eukaryota
- Kingdom: Animalia
- Phylum: Arthropoda
- Class: Insecta
- Order: Lepidoptera
- Superfamily: Noctuoidea
- Family: Erebidae
- Subfamily: Arctiinae
- Genus: Elysius
- Species: E. amapaensis

Binomial name
- Elysius amapaensis Rego Barros, 1971

Species of moth

Elysius amapaensis is a species of moth in the family Erebidae. It was first described by Rego Barros in 1971. It is found in Brazil.
