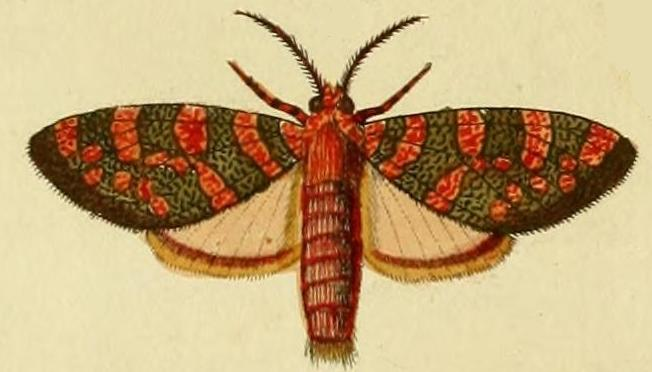

Scientific classification
- Domain: Eukaryota
- Kingdom: Animalia
- Phylum: Arthropoda
- Class: Insecta
- Order: Lepidoptera
- Superfamily: Noctuoidea
- Family: Erebidae
- Subfamily: Arctiinae
- Genus: Elysius
- Species: E. hermia

Binomial name
- Elysius hermia (Cramer, [1777])

Synonyms
- Phalaena hermia Cramer, [1777]

= Elysius hermia =

Species of moth

Elysius hermia is a moth of the family Erebidae first described by Pieter Cramer in 1777. It is found in French Guiana, Suriname, Guyana, Brazil, Venezuela and Colombia.
