= Elysius terra =

Scientific classification
- Domain: Eukaryota
- Kingdom: Animalia
- Phylum: Arthropoda
- Class: Insecta
- Order: Lepidoptera
- Superfamily: Noctuoidea
- Family: Erebidae
- Subfamily: Arctiinae
- Genus: Elysius
- Species: E. terra

Binomial name
- Elysius terra H. Druce, 1906

Species of moth

Elysius terra is a moth of the family Erebidae. It was described by Herbert Druce in 1906. It is found in Peru.
