= Opharus agramma =

Scientific classification
- Domain: Eukaryota
- Kingdom: Animalia
- Phylum: Arthropoda
- Class: Insecta
- Order: Lepidoptera
- Superfamily: Noctuoidea
- Family: Erebidae
- Subfamily: Arctiinae
- Genus: Opharus
- Species: O. agramma

Binomial name
- Opharus agramma (Dognin, 1906)

Synonyms
- Halysidota agramma Dognin, 1906; Halisidota agramma

Species of moth

Opharus agramma is a moth of the family Erebidae. It was described by Paul Dognin in 1906. It is found in Peru.
