= Opharus muricolor =

Mousey-gray tiger moth

Scientific classification
- Kingdom: Animalia
- Phylum: Arthropoda
- Class: Insecta
- Order: Lepidoptera
- Superfamily: Noctuoidea
- Family: Erebidae
- Subfamily: Arctiinae
- Genus: Opharus
- Species: O. muricolor

Binomial name
- Opharus muricolor (Dyar, 1898)

Synonyms
- Pygarctia muricolor Dyar, 1898

Species of moth

Opharus muricolor, the mousey-gray tiger moth, is a moth of the family Erebidae. It was described by Harrison Gray Dyar Jr. in 1898. It is found in the US states of Arizona, New Mexico and Texas.

Adults have been recorded on wing from May to August.
