= Pelochyta cervina =

Scientific classification
- Domain: Eukaryota
- Kingdom: Animalia
- Phylum: Arthropoda
- Class: Insecta
- Order: Lepidoptera
- Superfamily: Noctuoidea
- Family: Erebidae
- Subfamily: Arctiinae
- Genus: Pelochyta
- Species: P. cervina

Binomial name
- Pelochyta cervina (H. Edwards, 1884)

Synonyms
- Euchalisidota cervina H. Edwards, 1884; Pelochyta cervina ab. guatemalae Strand, 1919; Pelochyta cervina ab. brunnitricha Strand, 1919

Species of moth

Pelochyta cervina is a moth of the family Erebidae. It was described by Henry Edwards in 1884. It is found in Mexico and Guatemala.
