= Phaegoptera medionigra =

Scientific classification
- Domain: Eukaryota
- Kingdom: Animalia
- Phylum: Arthropoda
- Class: Insecta
- Order: Lepidoptera
- Superfamily: Noctuoidea
- Family: Erebidae
- Subfamily: Arctiinae
- Genus: Phaegoptera
- Species: P. medionigra

Binomial name
- Phaegoptera medionigra (Reich, 1934)

Synonyms
- Opharus medionigra Reich, 1934

Species of moth

Phaegoptera medionigra is a moth of the family Erebidae. It was described by Reich in 1934. It is found in Brazil.
