= Opharus rema =

Scientific classification
- Kingdom: Animalia
- Phylum: Arthropoda
- Class: Insecta
- Order: Lepidoptera
- Superfamily: Noctuoidea
- Family: Erebidae
- Subfamily: Arctiinae
- Genus: Opharus
- Species: O. rema

Binomial name
- Opharus rema (Dognin, 1891)

Synonyms
- Pseudapistosia rema Dognin, 1891

Species of moth

Opharus rema is a moth of the family Erebidae. It was described by Paul Dognin in 1891. It is found in Santa Catarina, Brazil.
