= Elysius pyrosticta =

Scientific classification
- Kingdom: Animalia
- Phylum: Arthropoda
- Class: Insecta
- Order: Lepidoptera
- Superfamily: Noctuoidea
- Family: Erebidae
- Subfamily: Arctiinae
- Genus: Elysius
- Species: E. pyrosticta

Binomial name
- Elysius pyrosticta Hampson, 1905

Species of moth

Elysius pyrosticta is a moth of the family Erebidae. It was described by George Hampson in 1905. It is found in Brazil.
