= Opharus rudis =

Scientific classification
- Domain: Eukaryota
- Kingdom: Animalia
- Phylum: Arthropoda
- Class: Insecta
- Order: Lepidoptera
- Superfamily: Noctuoidea
- Family: Erebidae
- Subfamily: Arctiinae
- Genus: Opharus
- Species: O. rudis

Binomial name
- Opharus rudis (Schaus, 1911)

Synonyms
- Calidota rudis Schaus, 1911

Species of moth

Opharus rudis is a moth of the family Erebidae. It was described by William Schaus in 1911. It is found in Costa Rica.
