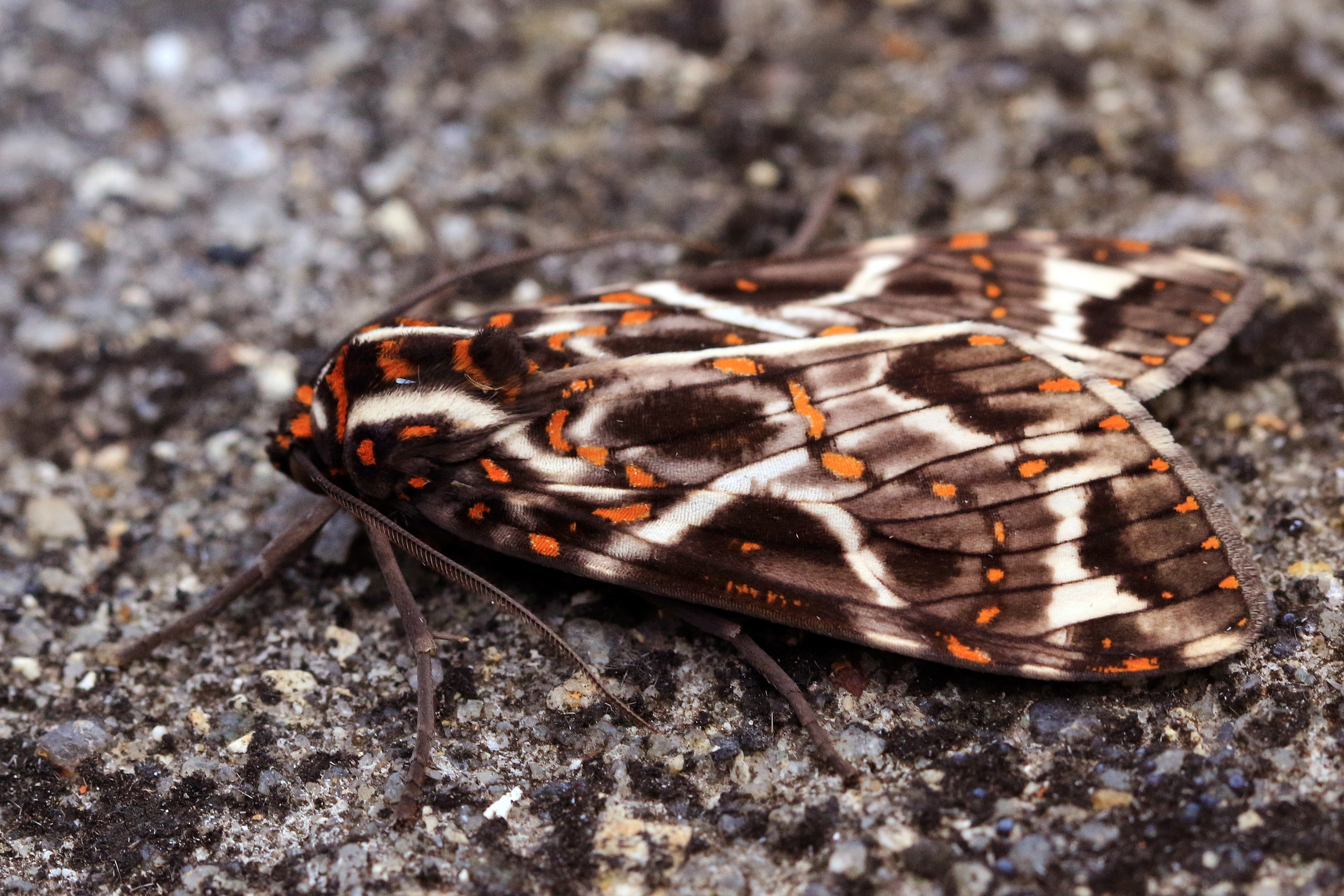

Scientific classification
- Kingdom: Animalia
- Phylum: Arthropoda
- Class: Insecta
- Order: Lepidoptera
- Superfamily: Noctuoidea
- Family: Erebidae
- Subfamily: Arctiinae
- Genus: Phaegoptera
- Species: P. flavopunctata

Binomial name
- Phaegoptera flavopunctata (Herrich-Schäffer, [1855])

Synonyms
- Phegoptera flavopunctata Herrich-Schäffer, [1855]; Halysidota catenata Walker, 1856; Phaegoptera fumosa Butler, 1876

= Phaegoptera flavopunctata =

Species of moth

Phaegoptera flavopunctata is a tiger moth of the family Erebidae. It was described by Gottlieb August Wilhelm Herrich-Schäffer in 1855. It is found in Brazil.
