= Phaegoptera granifera =

Scientific classification
- Domain: Eukaryota
- Kingdom: Animalia
- Phylum: Arthropoda
- Class: Insecta
- Order: Lepidoptera
- Superfamily: Noctuoidea
- Family: Erebidae
- Subfamily: Arctiinae
- Genus: Phaegoptera
- Species: P. granifera

Binomial name
- Phaegoptera granifera Schaus, 1892

Species of moth

Phaegoptera granifera is a moth of the family Erebidae. It was described by William Schaus in 1892. It is found in southern Brazil.
