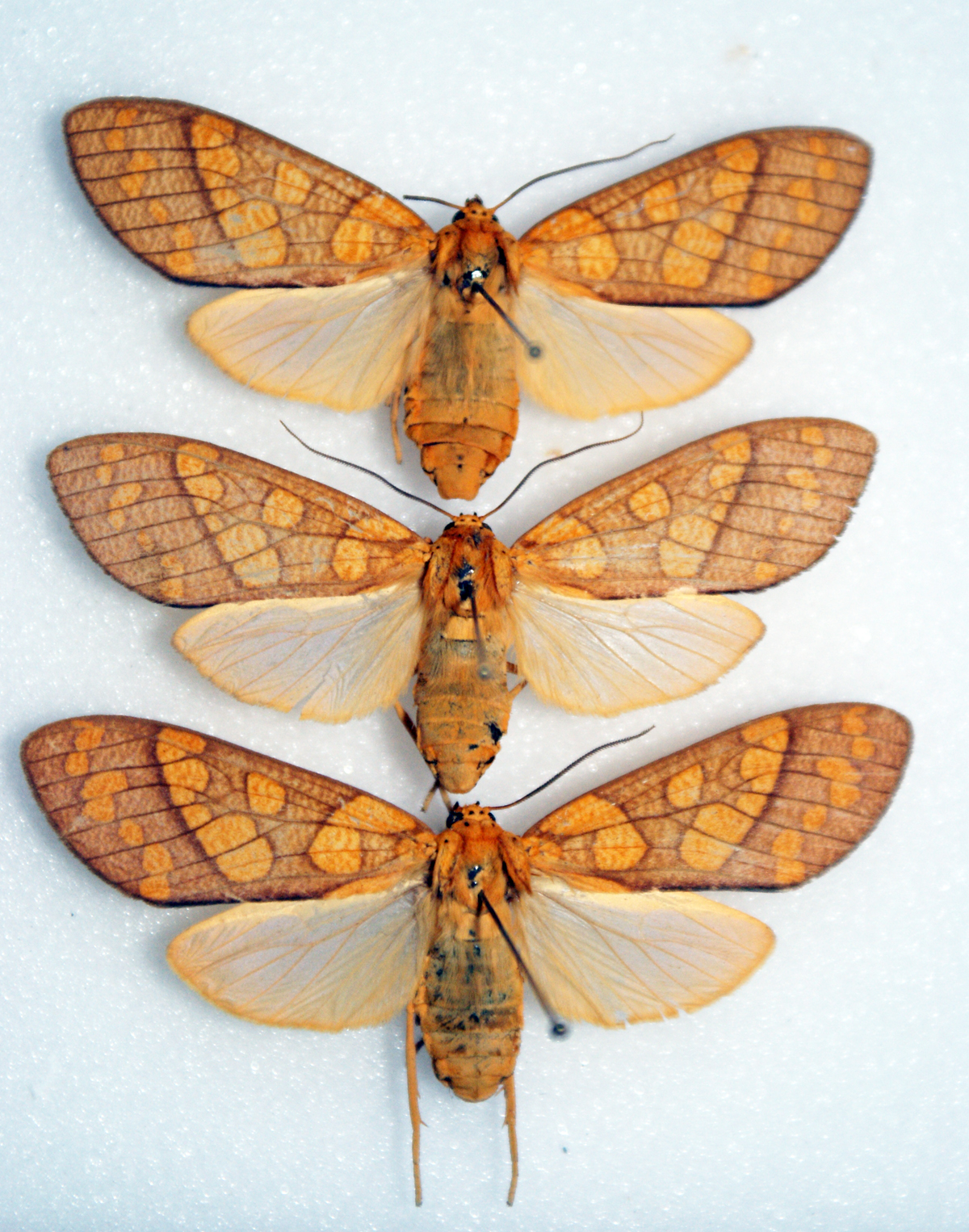
- Elysius sebrus

Scientific classification
- Domain: Eukaryota
- Kingdom: Animalia
- Phylum: Arthropoda
- Class: Insecta
- Order: Lepidoptera
- Superfamily: Noctuoidea
- Family: Erebidae
- Subfamily: Arctiinae
- Genus: Elysius
- Species: E. sebrus

Binomial name
- Elysius sebrus (H. Druce, 1899)

Synonyms
- Phaegoptera sebrus H. Druce, 1899

= Elysius sebrus =

Species of moth

Elysius sebrus is a moth of the family Erebidae. It was described by Herbert Druce in 1899. It is found in Brazil and Bolivia.
