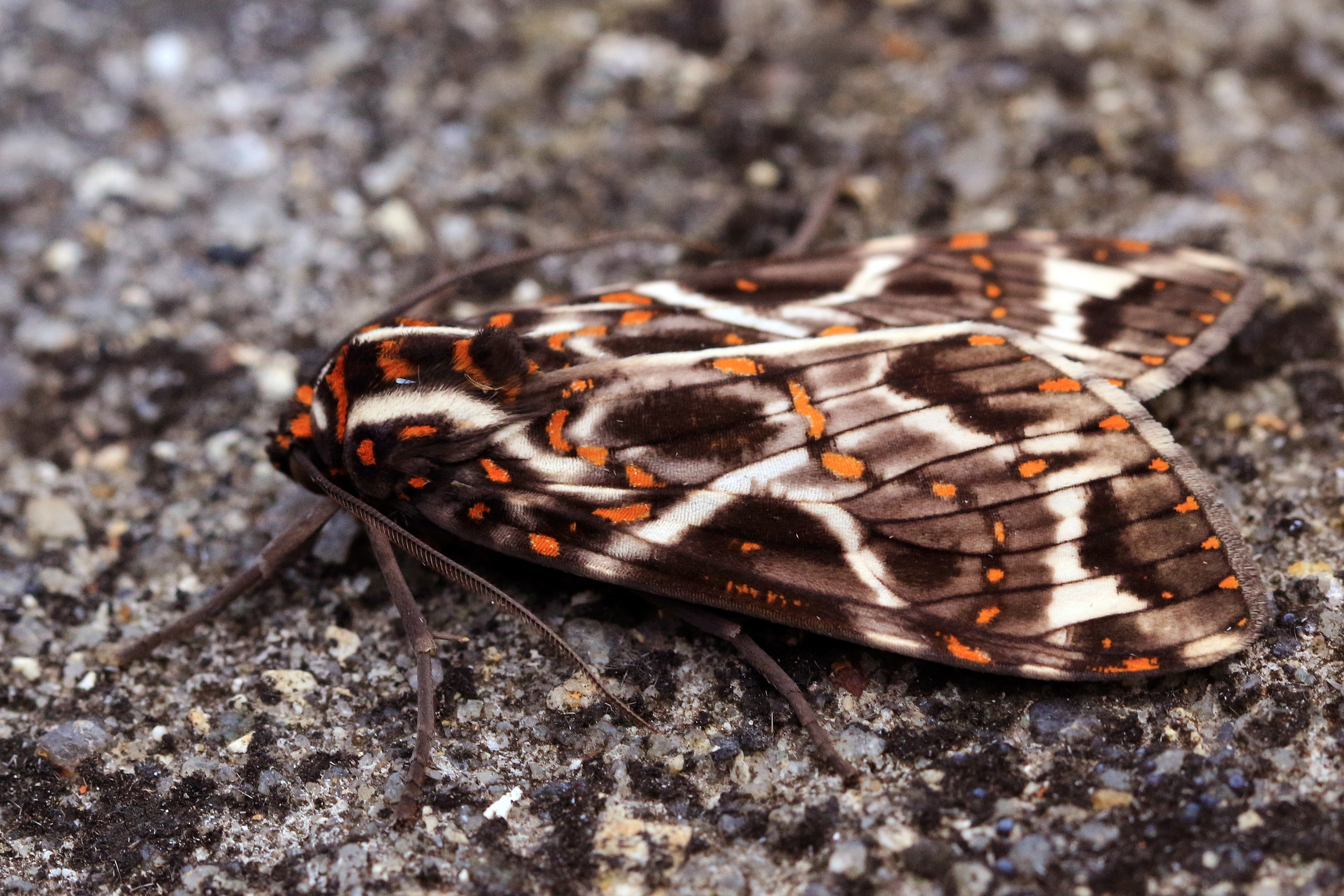
- Tiger moth (Phaegoptera histrionica)

Scientific classification
- Domain: Eukaryota
- Kingdom: Animalia
- Phylum: Arthropoda
- Class: Insecta
- Order: Lepidoptera
- Superfamily: Noctuoidea
- Family: Erebidae
- Subfamily: Arctiinae
- Genus: Phaegoptera
- Species: P. histrionica

Binomial name
- Phaegoptera histrionica Herrich-Schäffer, [1853]

= Phaegoptera histrionica =

Species of moth

Phaegoptera histrionica is a moth of the family Erebidae. It was described by Gottlieb August Wilhelm Herrich-Schäffer in 1853. It is found in Brazil.
