= Elysius thrailkilli =

Scientific classification
- Domain: Eukaryota
- Kingdom: Animalia
- Phylum: Arthropoda
- Class: Insecta
- Order: Lepidoptera
- Superfamily: Noctuoidea
- Family: Erebidae
- Subfamily: Arctiinae
- Genus: Elysius
- Species: E. thrailkilli

Binomial name
- Elysius thrailkilli (Schaus, 1892)

Synonyms
- Ammalo thrailkilli Schaus, 1892

Species of moth

Elysius thrailkilli is a moth of the family Erebidae. It was described by William Schaus in 1892. It is found in Mexico.
