= Elysius itaunensis =

Scientific classification
- Domain: Eukaryota
- Kingdom: Animalia
- Phylum: Arthropoda
- Class: Insecta
- Order: Lepidoptera
- Superfamily: Noctuoidea
- Family: Erebidae
- Subfamily: Arctiinae
- Genus: Elysius
- Species: E. itaunensis

Binomial name
- Elysius itaunensis Régo Barros, 1971

Species of moth

Elysius itaunensis is a moth of the family Erebidae. It was described by Alfredo Rei do Régo Barros in 1971. It is found in Brazil.
