= Elysius systron =

Scientific classification
- Domain: Eukaryota
- Kingdom: Animalia
- Phylum: Arthropoda
- Class: Insecta
- Order: Lepidoptera
- Superfamily: Noctuoidea
- Family: Erebidae
- Subfamily: Arctiinae
- Genus: Elysius
- Species: E. systron

Binomial name
- Elysius systron Schaus, 1904

Species of moth

Elysius systron is a moth of the family Erebidae. It was described by William Schaus in 1904. It is found in Brazil.
