= Elysius disciplaga =

Scientific classification
- Kingdom: Animalia
- Phylum: Arthropoda
- Class: Insecta
- Order: Lepidoptera
- Superfamily: Noctuoidea
- Family: Erebidae
- Subfamily: Arctiinae
- Genus: Elysius
- Species: E. disciplaga

Binomial name
- Elysius disciplaga (Walker, 1856)

Synonyms
- Halysidota disciplaga Walker, 1856; Halysidota breviuscula Walker, [1865]; Euhalisidota aperta H. Edwards, 1884; Synchesia breviuscula

Species of moth

Elysius disciplaga is a moth of the family Erebidae. It was described by Francis Walker in 1856. It is found in Mexico, Guatemala, Panama, Colombia, Bolivia.
