= Elysius jonesi =

Scientific classification
- Domain: Eukaryota
- Kingdom: Animalia
- Phylum: Arthropoda
- Class: Insecta
- Order: Lepidoptera
- Superfamily: Noctuoidea
- Family: Erebidae
- Subfamily: Arctiinae
- Genus: Elysius
- Species: E. jonesi

Binomial name
- Elysius jonesi Rothschild, 1910

Species of moth

Elysius jonesi is a moth of the family Erebidae. It was described by Walter Rothschild in 1910. It is found in Brazil.
