= Pelochyta aliena =

Scientific classification
- Domain: Eukaryota
- Kingdom: Animalia
- Phylum: Arthropoda
- Class: Insecta
- Order: Lepidoptera
- Superfamily: Noctuoidea
- Family: Erebidae
- Subfamily: Arctiinae
- Genus: Pelochyta
- Species: P. aliena

Binomial name
- Pelochyta aliena (Maassen, 1890)

Synonyms
- Sontia aliena Maassen, 1890; Agylla aliena (Maassen, 1890)

Species of moth

Pelochyta aliena is a moth of the subfamily Arctiinae. It was described by Peter Maassen in 1890. It is found in Colombia.
