= Elysius barnesi =

Scientific classification
- Kingdom: Animalia
- Phylum: Arthropoda
- Class: Insecta
- Order: Lepidoptera
- Superfamily: Noctuoidea
- Family: Erebidae
- Subfamily: Arctiinae
- Genus: Elysius
- Species: E. barnesi

Binomial name
- Elysius barnesi Schaus, 1904

Species of moth

Elysius barnesi is a moth of the family Erebidae. It was described by William Schaus in 1904. It is found on Cuba.
