= Elysius phantasma =

Scientific classification
- Domain: Eukaryota
- Kingdom: Animalia
- Phylum: Arthropoda
- Class: Insecta
- Order: Lepidoptera
- Superfamily: Noctuoidea
- Family: Erebidae
- Subfamily: Arctiinae
- Genus: Elysius
- Species: E. phantasma

Binomial name
- Elysius phantasma Schaus, 1905

Species of moth

Elysius phantasma is a moth of the family Erebidae. It was described by William Schaus in 1905. It is found in French Guiana and Suriname.
