= Opharus flavicostata =

Scientific classification
- Domain: Eukaryota
- Kingdom: Animalia
- Phylum: Arthropoda
- Class: Insecta
- Order: Lepidoptera
- Superfamily: Noctuoidea
- Family: Erebidae
- Subfamily: Arctiinae
- Genus: Opharus
- Species: O. flavicostata

Binomial name
- Opharus flavicostata Dognin, 1901

Species of moth

Opharus flavicostata is a moth of the family Erebidae. It was described by Paul Dognin in 1901. It is found in Colombia.
