= Pelochyta dorsicincta =

Scientific classification
- Kingdom: Animalia
- Phylum: Arthropoda
- Class: Insecta
- Order: Lepidoptera
- Superfamily: Noctuoidea
- Family: Erebidae
- Subfamily: Arctiinae
- Genus: Pelochyta
- Species: P. dorsicincta

Binomial name
- Pelochyta dorsicincta Hampson, 1916

Species of moth

Pelochyta dorsicincta is a moth of the family Erebidae. It was described by George Hampson in 1916. It is found in Colombia.
