= Phaegoptera albescens =

Scientific classification
- Domain: Eukaryota
- Kingdom: Animalia
- Phylum: Arthropoda
- Class: Insecta
- Order: Lepidoptera
- Superfamily: Noctuoidea
- Family: Erebidae
- Subfamily: Arctiinae
- Genus: Phaegoptera
- Species: P. albescens

Binomial name
- Phaegoptera albescens Travassos, 1955

Species of moth

Phaegoptera albescens is a moth of the family Erebidae. It was described by Travassos in 1955. It is found in Brazil.
