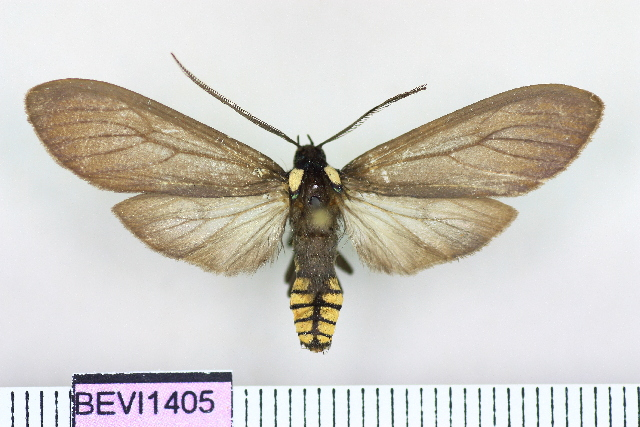

Scientific classification
- Domain: Eukaryota
- Kingdom: Animalia
- Phylum: Arthropoda
- Class: Insecta
- Order: Lepidoptera
- Superfamily: Noctuoidea
- Family: Erebidae
- Subfamily: Arctiinae
- Genus: Opharus
- Species: O. bimaculata

Binomial name
- Opharus bimaculata (Dewitz, 1877)

Synonyms
- Halysidota bimaculata Dewitz, 1877; Opharus albipunctatus Druce, 1884

= Opharus bimaculata =

Species of moth

Opharus bimaculata is a moth of the family Erebidae. It was described by Hermann Dewitz in 1877. It is found in Puerto Rico, Guatemala, Costa Rica, Honduras, Venezuela and Brazil.

== Subspecies ==
- Opharus bimaculata bimaculata (Puerto Rico)
- Opharus bimaculata major Rothschild, 1910 (Venezuela)
