= Elysius atrata =

Scientific classification
- Domain: Eukaryota
- Kingdom: Animalia
- Phylum: Arthropoda
- Class: Insecta
- Order: Lepidoptera
- Superfamily: Noctuoidea
- Family: Erebidae
- Subfamily: Arctiinae
- Genus: Elysius
- Species: E. atrata

Binomial name
- Elysius atrata (C. Felder, R. Felder & Rogenhofer, 1874)

Synonyms
- Lophocampa atrata C. Felder, R. Felder & Rogenhofer, 1874

Species of moth

Elysius atrata is a moth of the family Erebidae. It was described by Cajetan Felder, Rudolf Felder and Alois Friedrich Rogenhofer in 1874. It is found in Colombia, Ecuador, Bolivia and Peru.
