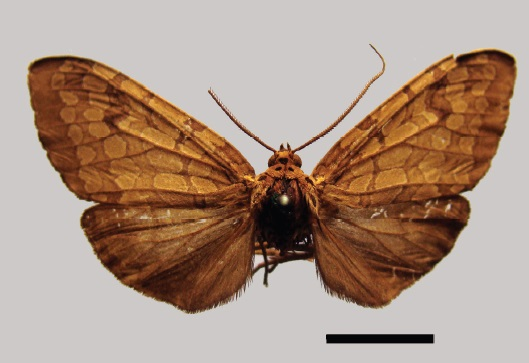
- Opharus picturata

Scientific classification
- Kingdom: Animalia
- Phylum: Arthropoda
- Clade: Pancrustacea
- Class: Insecta
- Order: Lepidoptera
- Superfamily: Noctuoidea
- Family: Erebidae
- Subfamily: Arctiinae
- Subtribe: Phaegopterina
- Genus: Opharus; Walker, 1855

= Opharus =

Genus of moths

Opharus is a genus of moths in the family Erebidae. The genus was erected by Francis Walker in 1855.

== Species ==
- Opharus aeschista (Dognin, 1911)
- Opharus agramma (Dognin, 1906)
- Opharus albiceps (Dognin, 1901)
- Opharus albijuncta Rothschild, 1916
- Opharus almopia (Druce, 1890)
- Opharus aurogutta (Schaus, 1896)
- Opharus basalis Walker, 1856
- Opharus belus Druce, 1897
- Opharus bimaculata (Dewitz, 1877)
- Opharus bipunctatus Vincent & Laguerre, 2009
- Opharus brasiliensis Vincent & Laguerre, 2009
- Opharus calosoma (Dyar, 1913)
- Opharus consimilis Hampson, 1901
- Opharus conspicuus Druce, 1906
- Opharus cortica (Walker, 1856)
- Opharus euchaetiformis H. Edwards, 1884
- Opharus fallax Toulgoët, 2002
- Opharus flavicostata Dognin, 1901
- Opharus flavimaculata Hampson, 1901
- Opharus franclemonti Watson & Goodger, 1986
- Opharus gemma Schaus, 1894
- Opharus immanis (H. Edwards, 1884)
- Opharus insulsa (Dognin, 1902)
- Opharus intermedia Rothschild, 1909
- Opharus laudia (Druce, 1890)
- Opharus lehmanni (Rothschild, 1910)
- Opharus linus Druce, 1897
- Opharus lugubris Toulgoët, 1981
- Opharus momis (Dyar, 1912)
- Opharus morosa Schaus, 1892
- Opharus muricolor (Dyar, 1898)
- Opharus navatteae Toulgoët, 2000
- Opharus nigrocinctus Rothschild, 1935
- Opharus notata (Schaus, 1892)
- Opharus omissoides Toulgoët, 1981
- Opharus palmeri Druce, 1909
- Opharus picturata (Burmeister, 1878)
- Opharus polystrigata Hampson, 1901
- Opharus procroides Walker, 1855
- Opharus quadripunctata (Schaus, 1910)
- Opharus rema (Dognin, 1891)
- Opharus rhodosoma (Butler, 1876)
- Opharus roseistriga Schaus, 1910
- Opharus rudis (Schaus, 1911)
- Opharus subflavus Toulgoët, 1981
- Opharus trama (Dognin, 1894)
- Opharus tricyphoides (Rothschild, 1909)
