= Pelochyta brunnescens =

Scientific classification
- Domain: Eukaryota
- Kingdom: Animalia
- Phylum: Arthropoda
- Class: Insecta
- Order: Lepidoptera
- Superfamily: Noctuoidea
- Family: Erebidae
- Subfamily: Arctiinae
- Genus: Pelochyta
- Species: P. brunnescens

Binomial name
- Pelochyta brunnescens Rothschild, 1909

Species of moth

Pelochyta brunnescens is a moth of the family Erebidae. It was described by Walter Rothschild in 1909. It is found in Peru, Ecuador and Panama.
