= Opharus albiceps =

Scientific classification
- Kingdom: Animalia
- Phylum: Arthropoda
- Class: Insecta
- Order: Lepidoptera
- Superfamily: Noctuoidea
- Family: Erebidae
- Subfamily: Arctiinae
- Genus: Opharus
- Species: O. albiceps

Binomial name
- Opharus albiceps (Dognin, 1901)

Synonyms
- Calidota albiceps Dognin, 1901; Ischnocampa farinosa Druce, 1906

Species of moth

Opharus albiceps is a moth of the family Erebidae. It was described by Paul Dognin in 1901. It is found in Venezuela.
