= Elysius proba =

Scientific classification
- Domain: Eukaryota
- Kingdom: Animalia
- Phylum: Arthropoda
- Class: Insecta
- Order: Lepidoptera
- Superfamily: Noctuoidea
- Family: Erebidae
- Subfamily: Arctiinae
- Genus: Elysius
- Species: E. proba

Binomial name
- Elysius proba (Schaus, 1892)

Synonyms
- Phaegoptera proba Schaus, 1892

Species of moth

Elysius proba is a moth of the family Erebidae. Described by William Schaus in 1892, it is found in Mexico and Honduras.
