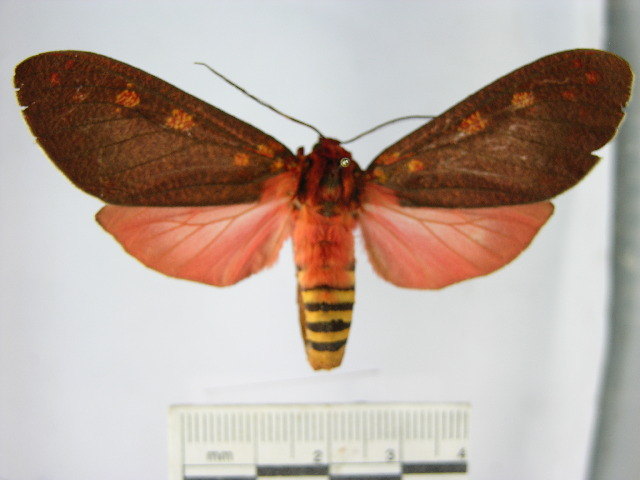

Scientific classification
- Kingdom: Animalia
- Phylum: Arthropoda
- Clade: Pancrustacea
- Class: Insecta
- Order: Lepidoptera
- Superfamily: Noctuoidea
- Family: Erebidae
- Subfamily: Arctiinae
- Genus: Elysius
- Species: E. cingulata

Binomial name
- Elysius cingulata (Walker, 1856)

Synonyms
- Halesidota cingulata Walker, 1856; Elysius cingulata ab. deleta Hulstaert, 1924; Elysius cingulata ab. pauper Hulstaert, 1924; Elysius cingulata f. demaculata Spitz, 1930

= Elysius cingulata =

Species of moth

Elysius cingulata is a moth of the family Erebidae. It is found on Jamaica and in South America, including Brazil, Paraguay and Argentina.
