= Opharus flavimaculata =

Scientific classification
- Kingdom: Animalia
- Phylum: Arthropoda
- Class: Insecta
- Order: Lepidoptera
- Superfamily: Noctuoidea
- Family: Erebidae
- Subfamily: Arctiinae
- Genus: Opharus
- Species: O. flavimaculata

Binomial name
- Opharus flavimaculata Hampson, 1901

Species of moth

Opharus flavimaculata is a moth of the family Erebidae. It was described by George Hampson in 1901. It is found in Brazil and Peru.
