= Opharus belus =

Scientific classification
- Domain: Eukaryota
- Kingdom: Animalia
- Phylum: Arthropoda
- Class: Insecta
- Order: Lepidoptera
- Superfamily: Noctuoidea
- Family: Erebidae
- Subfamily: Arctiinae
- Genus: Opharus
- Species: O. belus

Binomial name
- Opharus belus H. Druce, 1897

Species of moth

Opharus belus is a moth of the family Erebidae. It was described by Herbert Druce in 1897. It is found in Panama.
