= Pelochyta nigrescens =

Scientific classification
- Domain: Eukaryota
- Kingdom: Animalia
- Phylum: Arthropoda
- Class: Insecta
- Order: Lepidoptera
- Superfamily: Noctuoidea
- Family: Erebidae
- Subfamily: Arctiinae
- Genus: Pelochyta
- Species: P. nigrescens

Binomial name
- Pelochyta nigrescens (Dognin, 1891)

Synonyms
- Eucereon nigrescens Dognin, 1891

Species of moth

Pelochyta nigrescens is a moth of the family Erebidae. It was described by Paul Dognin in 1891. It is found in Ecuador, Bolivia and Peru.
