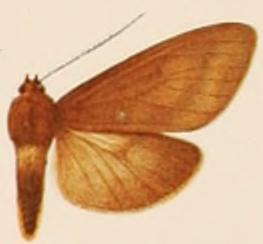

Scientific classification
- Domain: Eukaryota
- Kingdom: Animalia
- Phylum: Arthropoda
- Class: Insecta
- Order: Lepidoptera
- Superfamily: Noctuoidea
- Family: Erebidae
- Subfamily: Arctiinae
- Genus: Elysius
- Species: E. castanea

Binomial name
- Elysius castanea Rothschild, 1909

Synonyms
- Opharus jacca Druce, 1897; Pelochyta suffusa Joicey & Talbot, 1916

= Elysius castanea =

Species of moth

Elysius castanea is a moth of the family Erebidae first described by Walter Rothschild in 1909. It is found in Peru.
