= Opharus conspicuus =

Scientific classification
- Domain: Eukaryota
- Kingdom: Animalia
- Phylum: Arthropoda
- Class: Insecta
- Order: Lepidoptera
- Superfamily: Noctuoidea
- Family: Erebidae
- Subfamily: Arctiinae
- Genus: Opharus
- Species: O. conspicuus

Binomial name
- Opharus conspicuus H. Druce, 1906

Species of moth

Opharus conspicuus is a moth of the family Erebidae. It was described by Herbert Druce in 1906. It is found in Peru.
