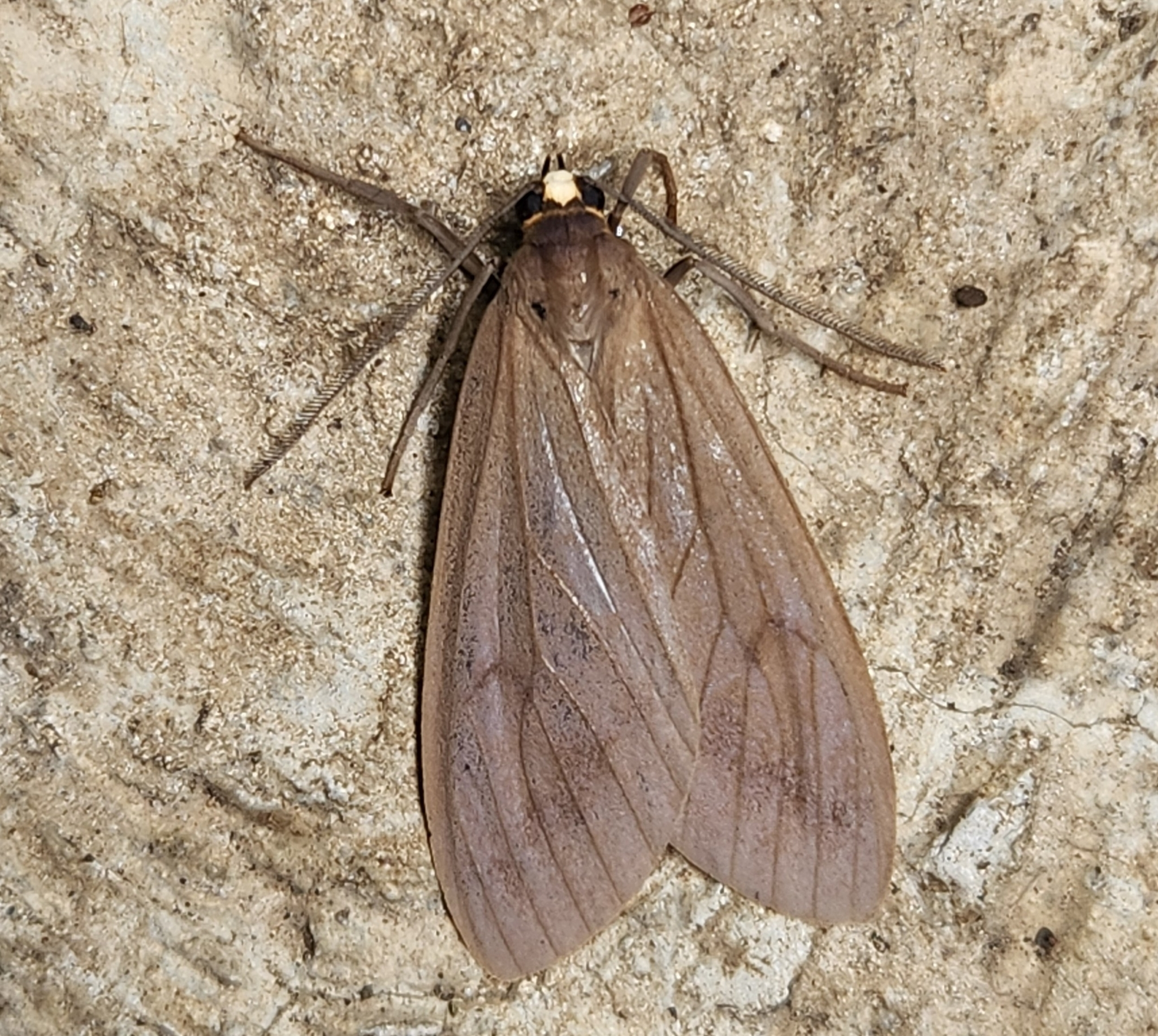

Scientific classification
- Kingdom: Animalia
- Phylum: Arthropoda
- Clade: Pancrustacea
- Class: Insecta
- Order: Lepidoptera
- Superfamily: Noctuoidea
- Family: Erebidae
- Subfamily: Arctiinae
- Genus: Opharus
- Species: O. immanis

Binomial name
- Opharus immanis (H. Edwards, 1884)

Synonyms
- Euchaeta immanis H. Edwards, 1884; Hemihyalea ochraceovirida Strand, 1921

= Opharus immanis =

Species of moth

Opharus immanis is a species of moth in the family Erebidae. It was first described by Henry Edwards in 1884. It is found in Mexico, Panama and Venezuela.
