= Phaegoptera punctularis =

Scientific classification
- Domain: Eukaryota
- Kingdom: Animalia
- Phylum: Arthropoda
- Class: Insecta
- Order: Lepidoptera
- Superfamily: Noctuoidea
- Family: Erebidae
- Subfamily: Arctiinae
- Genus: Phaegoptera
- Species: P. punctularis

Binomial name
- Phaegoptera punctularis (Herrich-Schäffer, [1855])

Synonyms
- Phegoptera punctularis Herrich-Schäffer, [1855]

Species of moth

Phaegoptera punctularis is a moth of the family Erebidae. It was described by Gottlieb August Wilhelm Herrich-Schäffer in 1855. It is found in Brazil.
