= Pelochyta cinerea =

Scientific classification
- Kingdom: Animalia
- Phylum: Arthropoda
- Class: Insecta
- Order: Lepidoptera
- Superfamily: Noctuoidea
- Family: Erebidae
- Subfamily: Arctiinae
- Genus: Pelochyta
- Species: P. cinerea

Binomial name
- Pelochyta cinerea (Walker, 1855)

Synonyms
- Halesidota cinerea Walker, 1855; Pseudapistosia lystra Druce, 1884

Species of moth

Pelochyta cinerea is a moth of the family Erebidae. It was described by Francis Walker in 1855. It is found in Costa Rica, Panama, Colombia, Venezuela, Ecuador, Bolivia and Brazil.
