= Opharus momis =

Scientific classification
- Kingdom: Animalia
- Phylum: Arthropoda
- Class: Insecta
- Order: Lepidoptera
- Superfamily: Noctuoidea
- Family: Erebidae
- Subfamily: Arctiinae
- Genus: Opharus
- Species: O. momis

Binomial name
- Opharus momis (Dyar, 1912)

Synonyms
- Calidota momis Dyar, 1912

Species of moth

Opharus momis is a moth of the family Erebidae. It was described by Harrison Gray Dyar Jr. in 1912. It is found in Mexico.
