= Pelochyta ruficollis =

Scientific classification
- Domain: Eukaryota
- Kingdom: Animalia
- Phylum: Arthropoda
- Class: Insecta
- Order: Lepidoptera
- Superfamily: Noctuoidea
- Family: Erebidae
- Subfamily: Arctiinae
- Genus: Pelochyta
- Species: P. ruficollis

Binomial name
- Pelochyta ruficollis (H. Druce, 1884)

Synonyms
- Opharus ruficollis H. Druce, 1884

Species of moth

Pelochyta ruficollis is a moth of the family Erebidae. It was described by Herbert Druce in 1884. It is found in Panama.
