= Opharus procroides =

Scientific classification
- Kingdom: Animalia
- Phylum: Arthropoda
- Class: Insecta
- Order: Lepidoptera
- Superfamily: Noctuoidea
- Family: Erebidae
- Subfamily: Arctiinae
- Genus: Opharus
- Species: O. procroides

Binomial name
- Opharus procroides Walker, 1855

Species of moth

Opharus procroides is a moth of the family Erebidae. It was described by Francis Walker in 1855. It is found in Panama, Brazil, Bolivia, Peru, Venezuela and Ecuador.
