= Phaegoptera irregularis =

Scientific classification
- Domain: Eukaryota
- Kingdom: Animalia
- Phylum: Arthropoda
- Class: Insecta
- Order: Lepidoptera
- Superfamily: Noctuoidea
- Family: Erebidae
- Subfamily: Arctiinae
- Genus: Phaegoptera
- Species: P. irregularis

Binomial name
- Phaegoptera irregularis (Rothschild, 1916)

Synonyms
- Opharus irregularis Rothschild, 1916

Species of moth

Phaegoptera irregularis is a moth of the family Erebidae. It was described by Walter Rothschild in 1916. It is found in Colombia.
