= Elysius anomala =

Scientific classification
- Domain: Eukaryota
- Kingdom: Animalia
- Phylum: Arthropoda
- Class: Insecta
- Order: Lepidoptera
- Superfamily: Noctuoidea
- Family: Erebidae
- Subfamily: Arctiinae
- Genus: Elysius
- Species: E. anomala

Binomial name
- Elysius anomala Jörgensen, 1935

Species of moth

Elysius anomala is a moth of the family Erebidae. It was described by Peter Jörgensen in 1935. It is found in Paraguay.
