= Pelochyta joseensis =

Scientific classification
- Domain: Eukaryota
- Kingdom: Animalia
- Phylum: Arthropoda
- Class: Insecta
- Order: Lepidoptera
- Superfamily: Noctuoidea
- Family: Erebidae
- Subfamily: Arctiinae
- Genus: Pelochyta
- Species: P. joseensis

Binomial name
- Pelochyta joseensis Strand, 1921

Species of moth

Pelochyta joseensis is a moth of the family Erebidae. It was described by Embrik Strand in 1921. It is found in Costa Rica.
