= Elysius ordinaria =

Scientific classification
- Domain: Eukaryota
- Kingdom: Animalia
- Phylum: Arthropoda
- Class: Insecta
- Order: Lepidoptera
- Superfamily: Noctuoidea
- Family: Erebidae
- Subfamily: Arctiinae
- Genus: Elysius
- Species: E. ordinaria

Binomial name
- Elysius ordinaria (Schaus, 1894)

Synonyms
- Pseudopistosia ordinaria Schaus, 1894

Species of moth

Elysius ordinaria is a moth of the family Erebidae. It was described by William Schaus in 1894. It is found in Brazil.
