= Opharus palmeri =

Scientific classification
- Domain: Eukaryota
- Kingdom: Animalia
- Phylum: Arthropoda
- Class: Insecta
- Order: Lepidoptera
- Superfamily: Noctuoidea
- Family: Erebidae
- Subfamily: Arctiinae
- Genus: Opharus
- Species: O. palmeri

Binomial name
- Opharus palmeri H. Druce, 1909

Species of moth

Opharus palmeri is a moth of the family Erebidae and the Sub-family Arctiinae. It was described by Herbert Druce in 1909. It is found in Colombia.
