= Opharus franclemonti =

Scientific classification
- Domain: Eukaryota
- Kingdom: Animalia
- Phylum: Arthropoda
- Class: Insecta
- Order: Lepidoptera
- Superfamily: Noctuoidea
- Family: Erebidae
- Subfamily: Arctiinae
- Genus: Opharus
- Species: O. franclemonti

Binomial name
- Opharus franclemonti Watson & Goodger, 1986

Synonyms
- Opharus muricolor Rothschild, 1933 (preocc. Dyar, 1898)

Species of moth

Opharus franclemonti is a moth of the family Erebidae. It was described by Watson and Goodger in 1986. It is found in Peru.
