= Opharus aeschista =

Scientific classification
- Domain: Eukaryota
- Kingdom: Animalia
- Phylum: Arthropoda
- Class: Insecta
- Order: Lepidoptera
- Superfamily: Noctuoidea
- Family: Erebidae
- Subfamily: Arctiinae
- Genus: Opharus
- Species: O. aeschista

Binomial name
- Opharus aeschista (Dognin, 1911)

Synonyms
- Elysius aeschista Dognin, 1911

Species of moth

Opharus aeschista is a moth of the family Erebidae. It was described by Paul Dognin in 1911. It is found in Colombia.
