= Pelochyta semivitrea =

Scientific classification
- Domain: Eukaryota
- Kingdom: Animalia
- Phylum: Arthropoda
- Class: Insecta
- Order: Lepidoptera
- Superfamily: Noctuoidea
- Family: Erebidae
- Subfamily: Arctiinae
- Genus: Pelochyta
- Species: P. semivitrea

Binomial name
- Pelochyta semivitrea (Dognin, 1907)

Synonyms
- Halysidota semivitrea Dognin, 1907

Species of moth

Pelochyta semivitrea is a moth of the family Erebidae. It was first described by Paul Dognin in 1907. It is found in Peru.
