= Opharus basalis =

Scientific classification
- Kingdom: Animalia
- Phylum: Arthropoda
- Class: Insecta
- Order: Lepidoptera
- Superfamily: Noctuoidea
- Family: Erebidae
- Subfamily: Arctiinae
- Genus: Opharus
- Species: O. basalis

Binomial name
- Opharus basalis Walker, 1856

Species of moth

Opharus basalis is a moth of the family Erebidae. It was described by Francis Walker in 1856. It is found in Venezuela, Brazil and Bolivia.
