= Pelochyta arontes =

Scientific classification
- Domain: Eukaryota
- Kingdom: Animalia
- Phylum: Arthropoda
- Class: Insecta
- Order: Lepidoptera
- Superfamily: Noctuoidea
- Family: Erebidae
- Subfamily: Arctiinae
- Genus: Pelochyta
- Species: P. arontes

Binomial name
- Pelochyta arontes (Stoll, [1782])

Synonyms
- Sphinx arontes Stoll, [1782]; Phalaena neuroptera Sepp, [1848]; Halesidota degenera Walker, 1855

Species of moth

Pelochyta arontes is a moth of the family Erebidae. It was described by Stoll in 1782. It is found in Guatemala, Costa Rica, Panama, Peru, Venezuela, Paraguay, Trinidad, Ecuador, Suriname and Bolivia.
