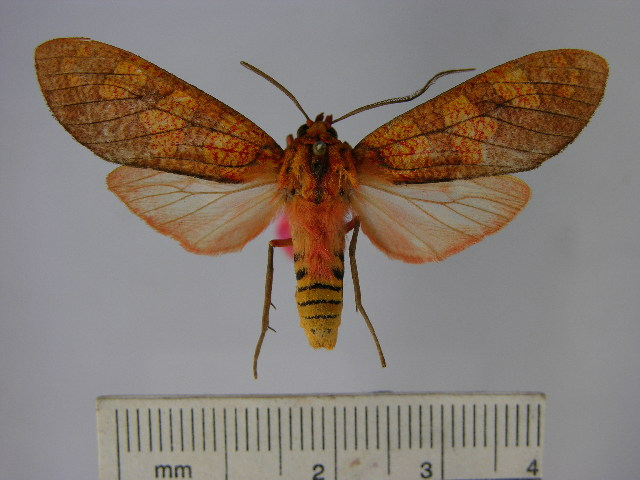

Scientific classification
- Kingdom: Animalia
- Phylum: Arthropoda
- Class: Insecta
- Order: Lepidoptera
- Superfamily: Noctuoidea
- Family: Erebidae
- Subfamily: Arctiinae
- Genus: Elysius
- Species: E. conspersus

Binomial name
- Elysius conspersus Walker, 1855

Synonyms
- Elysius conspersa

= Elysius conspersus =

Species of moth

Elysius conspersus is a moth of the family Erebidae. It was described by Francis Walker in 1855. It is found in Panama, Colombia, Venezuela, Peru, Brazil, Paraguay and Ecuador.
