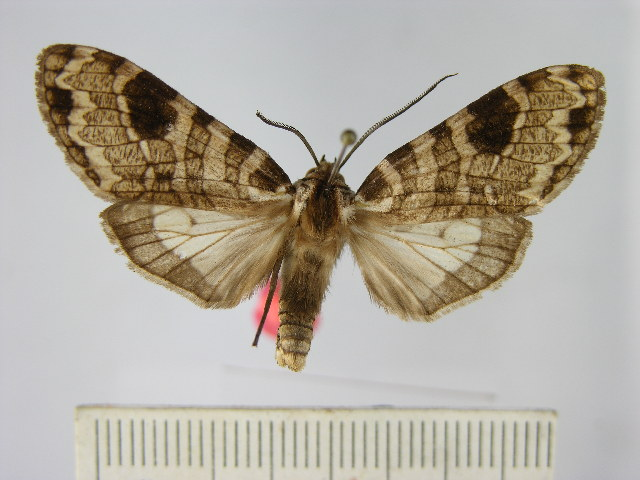

Scientific classification
- Domain: Eukaryota
- Kingdom: Animalia
- Phylum: Arthropoda
- Class: Insecta
- Order: Lepidoptera
- Superfamily: Noctuoidea
- Family: Erebidae
- Subfamily: Arctiinae
- Genus: Elysius
- Species: E. rabusculum

Binomial name
- Elysius rabusculum (Dognin, 1905)

Synonyms
- Eucereon rabusculum Dognin, 1905

= Elysius rabusculum =

Species of moth

Elysius rabusculum is a moth of the family Erebidae first described by Paul Dognin in 1905. It is found in Peru.
