= Phaegoptera ochracea =

Scientific classification
- Domain: Eukaryota
- Kingdom: Animalia
- Phylum: Arthropoda
- Class: Insecta
- Order: Lepidoptera
- Superfamily: Noctuoidea
- Family: Erebidae
- Subfamily: Arctiinae
- Genus: Phaegoptera
- Species: P. ochracea

Binomial name
- Phaegoptera ochracea Joicey & Talbot, 1918

Species of moth

Phaegoptera ochracea is a moth of the family Erebidae. It was described by James John Joicey and George Talbot in 1918. It is found in Peru.
