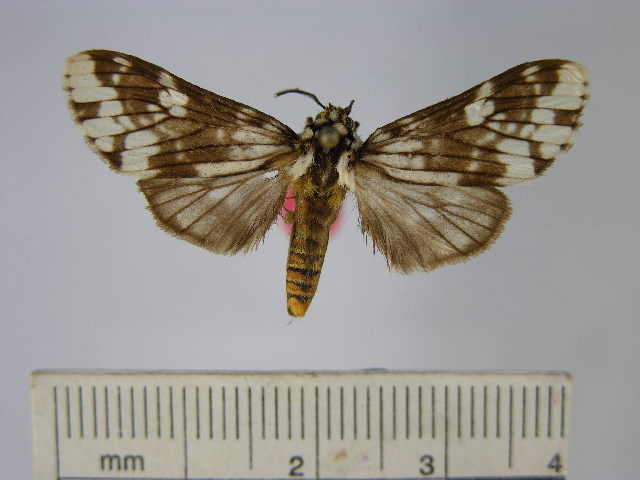

Scientific classification
- Domain: Eukaryota
- Kingdom: Animalia
- Phylum: Arthropoda
- Class: Insecta
- Order: Lepidoptera
- Superfamily: Noctuoidea
- Family: Erebidae
- Subfamily: Arctiinae
- Genus: Phaegoptera
- Species: P. sestia

Binomial name
- Phaegoptera sestia (H. Druce, 1906)

Synonyms
- Opharus sestia H. Druce, 1906

= Phaegoptera sestia =

Species of moth

Phaegoptera sestia is a moth of the family Erebidae. It was described by Herbert Druce in 1906. It is found in Peru.
