= Opharus corticea =

Scientific classification
- Kingdom: Animalia
- Phylum: Arthropoda
- Clade: Pancrustacea
- Class: Insecta
- Order: Lepidoptera
- Superfamily: Noctuoidea
- Family: Erebidae
- Subfamily: Arctiinae
- Genus: Opharus
- Species: O. corticea

Binomial name
- Opharus corticea (Walker, (1856)

Synonyms
- Halysidota corticea Walker, 1856; Phaegoptera corticea (Walker, 1856); Opharus cortica (Walker, 1856)

Species of moth

Opharus corticea is a moth of the family Erebidae. It was described by Francis Walker in 1856. It is found in Venezuela.

== Taxonomy ==
This species was first described by Francis Walker using female specimens from Mr. Saunders collection, collected in Venezuela, and named Halysidota corticea. In 1892 Kirby placed this species within the genus Phaegoptera. In 1919 Embrik Strand placed this species within the genus Opharus.

== Description ==
Walker described the adult female of the species as follows:

Female. Greenish yellow, much like H. basipennis in structure. Proboscis tawny. Palpi striped with green. Antennae pale yellow. Abdomen dull luteous, with a row of black spots along each side. Tibiae and tarsi with brown bands. Fore wings are pale testaceous, mostly thickly covered with brown flecks, which are frequently confluent, the intermediate parts form slight undulating bands; veins with black bands. Hind wings bright cinereous. Length of the body seven lines; of the wings twenty-two lines.

== Research and studies ==
- Taxonomic Studies:
  - Michel Laguerre's 2014 catalogue provides a comprehensive overview of the Neotropical Arctiini, including O. corticea.
