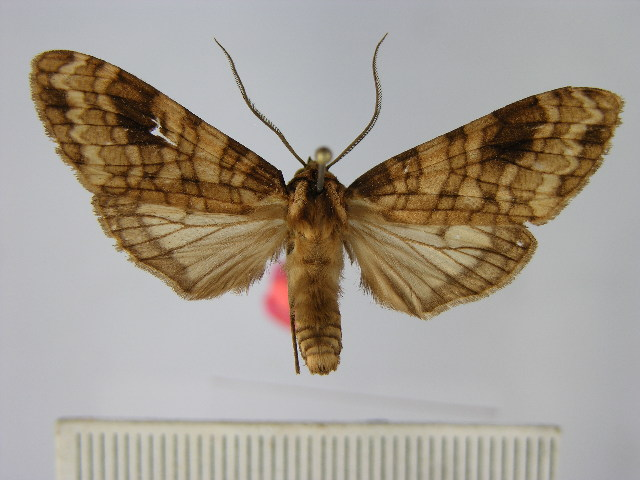

Scientific classification
- Kingdom: Animalia
- Phylum: Arthropoda
- Class: Insecta
- Order: Lepidoptera
- Superfamily: Noctuoidea
- Family: Erebidae
- Subfamily: Arctiinae
- Genus: Elysius
- Species: E. melanoplaga

Binomial name
- Elysius melanoplaga Hampson, 1901

Synonyms
- Elysius amarua Seitz, 1922

= Elysius melanoplaga =

Species of moth

Elysius melanoplaga is a moth of the family Erebidae first described by George Hampson in 1901. It is found in Ecuador and Bolivia.

== Subspecies ==
- Elysius melanoplaga melanoplaga (Ecuador)
- Elysius melanoplaga amarua Seitz, 1922 (Bolivia)
