= Phaegoptera albimacula =

Scientific classification
- Domain: Eukaryota
- Kingdom: Animalia
- Phylum: Arthropoda
- Class: Insecta
- Order: Lepidoptera
- Superfamily: Noctuoidea
- Family: Erebidae
- Subfamily: Arctiinae
- Genus: Phaegoptera
- Species: P. albimacula

Binomial name
- Phaegoptera albimacula (E. D. Jones, 1908)

Synonyms
- Opharus albimacula E. D. Jones, 1908

Species of moth

Phaegoptera albimacula is a moth of the family Erebidae. It was described by E. Dukinfield Jones in 1908. It is found in Brazil.
