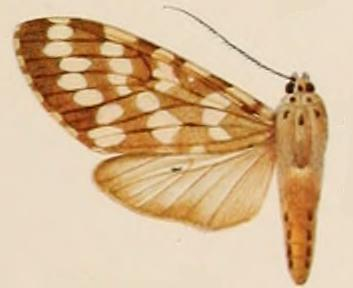

Scientific classification
- Domain: Eukaryota
- Kingdom: Animalia
- Phylum: Arthropoda
- Class: Insecta
- Order: Lepidoptera
- Superfamily: Noctuoidea
- Family: Erebidae
- Subfamily: Arctiinae
- Genus: Phaegoptera
- Species: P. fasciatus

Binomial name
- Phaegoptera fasciatus (Rothschild, 1909)

Synonyms
- Opharus fasciatus Rothschild, 1909

= Phaegoptera fasciatus =

Species of moth

Phaegoptera fasciatus is a moth of the family Erebidae first described by Walter Rothschild in 1909. It is found in Venezuela.
