= Pelochyta arenacea =

Scientific classification
- Domain: Eukaryota
- Kingdom: Animalia
- Phylum: Arthropoda
- Class: Insecta
- Order: Lepidoptera
- Superfamily: Noctuoidea
- Family: Erebidae
- Subfamily: Arctiinae
- Genus: Pelochyta
- Species: P. arenacea

Binomial name
- Pelochyta arenacea (Schaus, 1901)

Synonyms
- Halisidota arenacea Schaus, 1901

Species of moth

Pelochyta arenacea is a moth of the family Erebidae. It was described by William Schaus in 1901. It is found in Ecuador.
