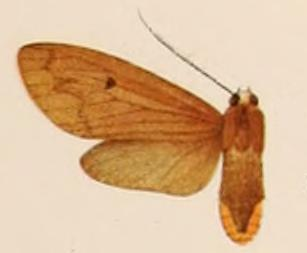

Scientific classification
- Domain: Eukaryota
- Kingdom: Animalia
- Phylum: Arthropoda
- Class: Insecta
- Order: Lepidoptera
- Superfamily: Noctuoidea
- Family: Erebidae
- Subfamily: Arctiinae
- Genus: Opharus
- Species: O. tricyphoides

Binomial name
- Opharus tricyphoides (Rothschild, 1909)

Synonyms
- Elysius tricyphoides Rothschild, 1909

= Opharus tricyphoides =

Species of moth

Opharus tricyphoides is a moth of the family Erebidae first described by Walter Rothschild in 1909. It is found in Brazil, Peru and Costa Rica.
