= Opharus lehmanni =

Scientific classification
- Domain: Eukaryota
- Kingdom: Animalia
- Phylum: Arthropoda
- Class: Insecta
- Order: Lepidoptera
- Superfamily: Noctuoidea
- Family: Erebidae
- Subfamily: Arctiinae
- Genus: Opharus
- Species: O. lehmanni

Binomial name
- Opharus lehmanni (Rothschild, 1910)

Synonyms
- Elysius lehmanni Rothschild, 1910; Amastus lehmanni

Species of moth

Opharus lehmanni is a moth of the family Erebidae. It was described by Walter Rothschild in 1910. It is found in Colombia.
