= Phaegoptera flavostrigata =

Scientific classification
- Domain: Eukaryota
- Kingdom: Animalia
- Phylum: Arthropoda
- Class: Insecta
- Order: Lepidoptera
- Superfamily: Noctuoidea
- Family: Erebidae
- Subfamily: Arctiinae
- Genus: Phaegoptera
- Species: P. flavostrigata

Binomial name
- Phaegoptera flavostrigata (Herrich-Schäffer, [1855])

Synonyms
- Phegoptera flavostrigata Herrich-Schäffer, [1855]; Opharus f. dissimilis Reich, 1934

Species of moth

Phaegoptera flavostrigata is a moth of the family Erebidae. It was described by Gottlieb August Wilhelm Herrich-Schäffer in 1855. It is found in Brazil.
