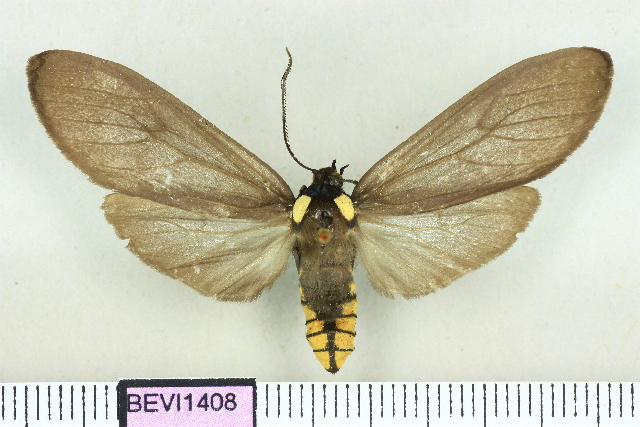

Scientific classification
- Domain: Eukaryota
- Kingdom: Animalia
- Phylum: Arthropoda
- Class: Insecta
- Order: Lepidoptera
- Superfamily: Noctuoidea
- Family: Erebidae
- Subfamily: Arctiinae
- Genus: Opharus
- Species: O. brasiliensis

Binomial name
- Opharus brasiliensis Vincent & Laguerre, 2009

= Opharus brasiliensis =

Species of moth

Opharus brasiliensis is a moth of the family Erebidae. It was described by Vincent and Laguerre in 2009. It is found in Brazil (Santa Catarina).
