= Pelochyta fassli =

Scientific classification
- Domain: Eukaryota
- Kingdom: Animalia
- Phylum: Arthropoda
- Class: Insecta
- Order: Lepidoptera
- Superfamily: Noctuoidea
- Family: Erebidae
- Subfamily: Arctiinae
- Genus: Pelochyta
- Species: P. fassli

Binomial name
- Pelochyta fassli Rothschild, 1911

Species of moth

Pelochyta fassli is a moth of the family Erebidae. It was described by Walter Rothschild in 1911. It is found in Colombia.
