= Opharus almopia =

Scientific classification
- Domain: Eukaryota
- Kingdom: Animalia
- Phylum: Arthropoda
- Class: Insecta
- Order: Lepidoptera
- Superfamily: Noctuoidea
- Family: Erebidae
- Subfamily: Arctiinae
- Genus: Opharus
- Species: O. almopia

Binomial name
- Opharus almopia (H. Druce, 1890)

Synonyms
- Phaegoptera almopia H. Druce, 1890

Species of moth

Opharus almopia is a moth of the family Erebidae. It was described by Herbert Druce in 1890. It is found in Colombia.
