= Elysius flavoabdominalis =

Scientific classification
- Domain: Eukaryota
- Kingdom: Animalia
- Phylum: Arthropoda
- Class: Insecta
- Order: Lepidoptera
- Superfamily: Noctuoidea
- Family: Erebidae
- Subfamily: Arctiinae
- Genus: Elysius
- Species: E. flavoabdominalis

Binomial name
- Elysius flavoabdominalis Rothschild, 1935

Species of moth

Elysius flavoabdominalis is a moth of the family Erebidae. It was described by Walter Rothschild in 1935. It is found in São Paulo, Brazil.
