= Opharus navatteae =

Scientific classification
- Kingdom: Animalia
- Phylum: Arthropoda
- Class: Insecta
- Order: Lepidoptera
- Superfamily: Noctuoidea
- Family: Erebidae
- Subfamily: Arctiinae
- Genus: Opharus
- Species: O. navatteae

Binomial name
- Opharus navatteae Toulgoët, 2000

Species of moth

Opharus navatteae is a moth of the family Erebidae. It was described by Hervé de Toulgoët in 2000. It is found in Peru.
