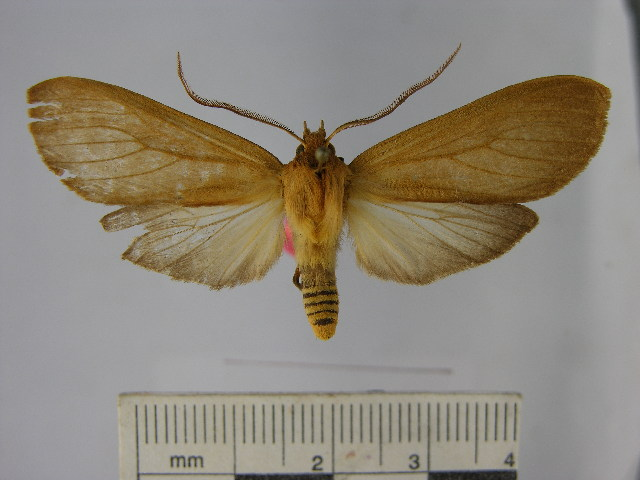

Scientific classification
- Kingdom: Animalia
- Phylum: Arthropoda
- Class: Insecta
- Order: Lepidoptera
- Superfamily: Noctuoidea
- Family: Erebidae
- Subfamily: Arctiinae
- Genus: Elysius
- Species: E. ochrota

Binomial name
- Elysius ochrota Hampson, 1901

= Elysius ochrota =

Species of moth

Elysius ochrota is a moth of the family Erebidae first described by George Hampson in 1901. It is found in Bolivia.
