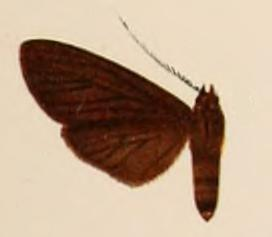
- Male
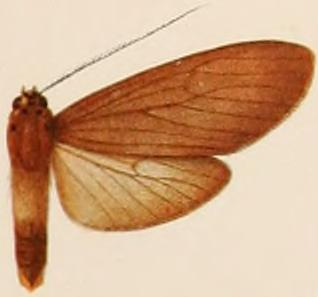
- Female

Scientific classification
- Domain: Eukaryota
- Kingdom: Animalia
- Phylum: Arthropoda
- Class: Insecta
- Order: Lepidoptera
- Superfamily: Noctuoidea
- Family: Erebidae
- Subfamily: Arctiinae
- Genus: Pelochyta
- Species: P. atra

Binomial name
- Pelochyta atra Rothschild, 1909

= Pelochyta atra =

Species of moth

Pelochyta atra is a moth belonging to the family Erebidae. It was first described as a first described by Walter Rothschild in 1909. The moth is found in Peru.
