= Pelochyta adumbrata =

Scientific classification
- Domain: Eukaryota
- Kingdom: Animalia
- Phylum: Arthropoda
- Class: Insecta
- Order: Lepidoptera
- Superfamily: Noctuoidea
- Family: Erebidae
- Subfamily: Arctiinae
- Genus: Pelochyta
- Species: P. adumbrata

Binomial name
- Pelochyta adumbrata Dognin, 1922

Species of moth

Pelochyta adumbrata is a moth of the family Erebidae. It was described by Paul Dognin in 1922. It is found in Bolivia.
