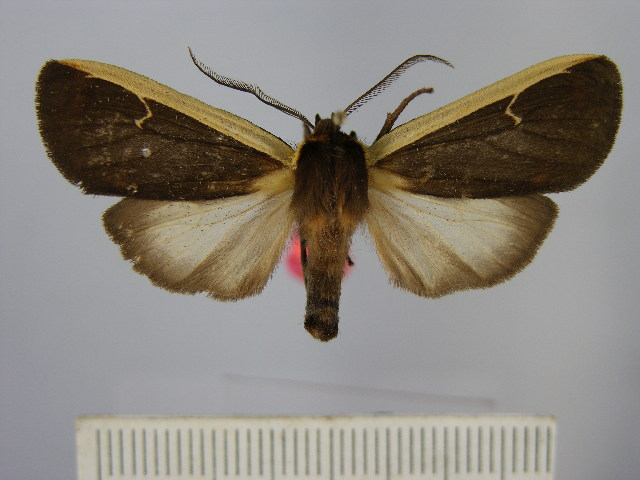

Scientific classification
- Domain: Eukaryota
- Kingdom: Animalia
- Phylum: Arthropoda
- Class: Insecta
- Order: Lepidoptera
- Superfamily: Noctuoidea
- Family: Erebidae
- Subfamily: Arctiinae
- Genus: Elysius
- Species: E. lavinia

Binomial name
- Elysius lavinia H. Druce, 1906

Synonyms
- Elysius lavinea

= Elysius lavinia =

Species of moth

Elysius lavinia is a moth of the family Erebidae first described by Herbert Druce in 1906. It is found in Peru.
