= Opharus aurogutta =

Scientific classification
- Domain: Eukaryota
- Kingdom: Animalia
- Phylum: Arthropoda
- Class: Insecta
- Order: Lepidoptera
- Superfamily: Noctuoidea
- Family: Erebidae
- Subfamily: Arctiinae
- Genus: Opharus
- Species: O. aurogutta

Binomial name
- Opharus aurogutta (Schaus, 1896)

Synonyms
- Phegoptera aurogutta Schaus, 1896

Species of moth

Opharus aurogutta is a moth of the family Erebidae. It was described by William Schaus in 1896. It is found in Colombia.
