= Opharus lugubris =

Scientific classification
- Kingdom: Animalia
- Phylum: Arthropoda
- Class: Insecta
- Order: Lepidoptera
- Superfamily: Noctuoidea
- Family: Erebidae
- Subfamily: Arctiinae
- Genus: Opharus
- Species: O. lugubris

Binomial name
- Opharus lugubris Toulgoët, 1981

Species of moth

Opharus lugubris is a moth of the family Erebidae. It was described by Hervé de Toulgoët in 1981. It is found in Ecuador.
