= Elysius melaleuca =

Scientific classification
- Domain: Eukaryota
- Kingdom: Animalia
- Phylum: Arthropoda
- Class: Insecta
- Order: Lepidoptera
- Superfamily: Noctuoidea
- Family: Erebidae
- Subfamily: Arctiinae
- Genus: Elysius
- Species: E. melaleuca

Binomial name
- Elysius melaleuca (Felder & Rogenhofer, 1874)

Synonyms
- Halysidota melaleuca (Felder, 1874); Lophocampa melaleuca Felder, 1874

Species of moth

Elysius melaleuca is a moth of the family Erebidae. It was described by Felder and Rogenhofer in 1874. It is found in Colombia.
