= Elysius hampsoni =

Scientific classification
- Domain: Eukaryota
- Kingdom: Animalia
- Phylum: Arthropoda
- Class: Insecta
- Order: Lepidoptera
- Superfamily: Noctuoidea
- Family: Erebidae
- Subfamily: Arctiinae
- Genus: Elysius
- Species: E. hampsoni

Binomial name
- Elysius hampsoni Dognin, 1907

Synonyms
- Elysius superba hampsoni (Dognin, 1907)

Species of moth

Elysius hampsoni is a moth of the family Erebidae first described by Paul Dognin in 1907. It is found in Peru.
