= Opharus fallax =

Scientific classification
- Kingdom: Animalia
- Phylum: Arthropoda
- Class: Insecta
- Order: Lepidoptera
- Superfamily: Noctuoidea
- Family: Erebidae
- Subfamily: Arctiinae
- Genus: Opharus
- Species: O. fallax

Binomial name
- Opharus fallax Toulgoët, 2002

Species of moth

Opharus fallax is a moth of the family Erebidae. It was described by Hervé de Toulgoët in 2002. It is found in Bolivia.
