= Pelochyta acuta =

Scientific classification
- Kingdom: Animalia
- Phylum: Arthropoda
- Class: Insecta
- Order: Lepidoptera
- Superfamily: Noctuoidea
- Family: Erebidae
- Subfamily: Arctiinae
- Genus: Pelochyta
- Species: P. acuta

Binomial name
- Pelochyta acuta Toulgoët, 1984

Species of moth

Pelochyta acuta is a moth of the family Erebidae. It was described by Hervé de Toulgoët in 1984. It is found in Ecuador.
