= Pelochyta misera =

Scientific classification
- Domain: Eukaryota
- Kingdom: Animalia
- Phylum: Arthropoda
- Class: Insecta
- Order: Lepidoptera
- Superfamily: Noctuoidea
- Family: Erebidae
- Subfamily: Arctiinae
- Genus: Pelochyta
- Species: P. misera

Binomial name
- Pelochyta misera Schaus, 1911

Species of moth

Pelochyta misera is a moth of the family Erebidae. It was described by William Schaus in 1911. It is found in Costa Rica.
