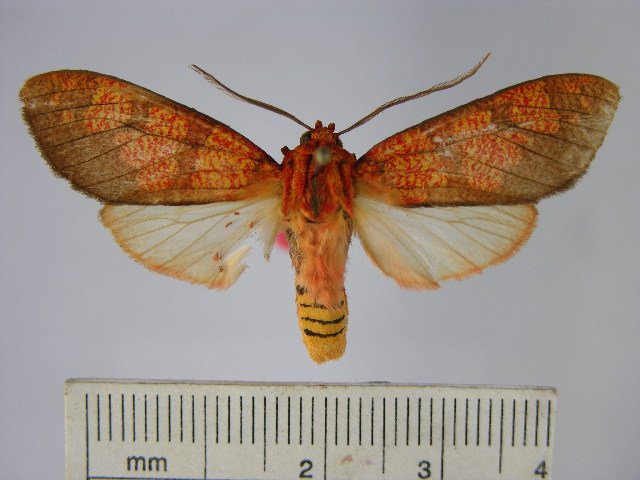

Scientific classification
- Domain: Eukaryota
- Kingdom: Animalia
- Phylum: Arthropoda
- Class: Insecta
- Order: Lepidoptera
- Superfamily: Noctuoidea
- Family: Erebidae
- Subfamily: Arctiinae
- Genus: Elysius
- Species: E. conjunctus

Binomial name
- Elysius conjunctus Rothschild, 1910

= Elysius conjunctus =

Species of moth

Elysius conjunctus is a moth of the family Erebidae. It was described by Walter Rothschild in 1910. It is found in Brazil and Venezuela.
