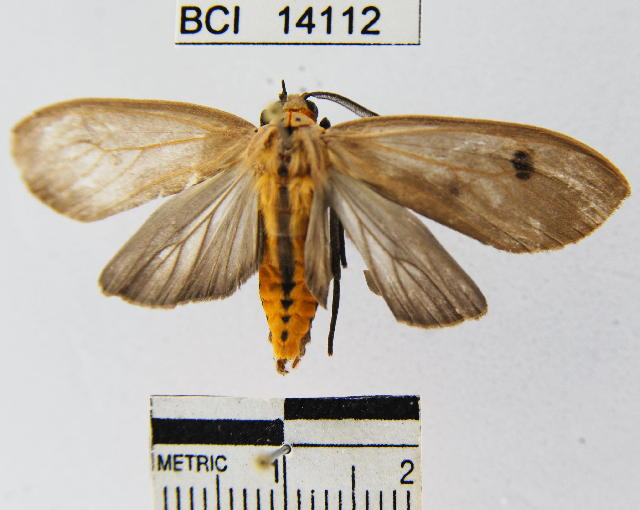

Scientific classification
- Domain: Eukaryota
- Kingdom: Animalia
- Phylum: Arthropoda
- Class: Insecta
- Order: Lepidoptera
- Superfamily: Noctuoidea
- Family: Erebidae
- Subfamily: Arctiinae
- Genus: Opharus
- Species: O. gemma

Binomial name
- Opharus gemma Schaus, 1894

= Opharus gemma =

Species of moth

Opharus gemma is a moth of the family Erebidae. It was described by William Schaus in 1894. It is found in French Guiana, Bolivia, Venezuela and the Brazilian state of Rio Grande do Sul.
