= Elysius carbonarius =

Scientific classification
- Domain: Eukaryota
- Kingdom: Animalia
- Phylum: Arthropoda
- Class: Insecta
- Order: Lepidoptera
- Superfamily: Noctuoidea
- Family: Erebidae
- Subfamily: Arctiinae
- Genus: Elysius
- Species: E. carbonarius

Binomial name
- Elysius carbonarius (Dognin, 1891)

Synonyms
- Sychesia carbonarius Dognin, 1891; Elysius fuliginosus Rothschild, 1909

Species of moth

Elysius carbonarius is a moth of the family Erebidae. It was described by Paul Dognin in 1891. It is found in Bolivia and Peru.
