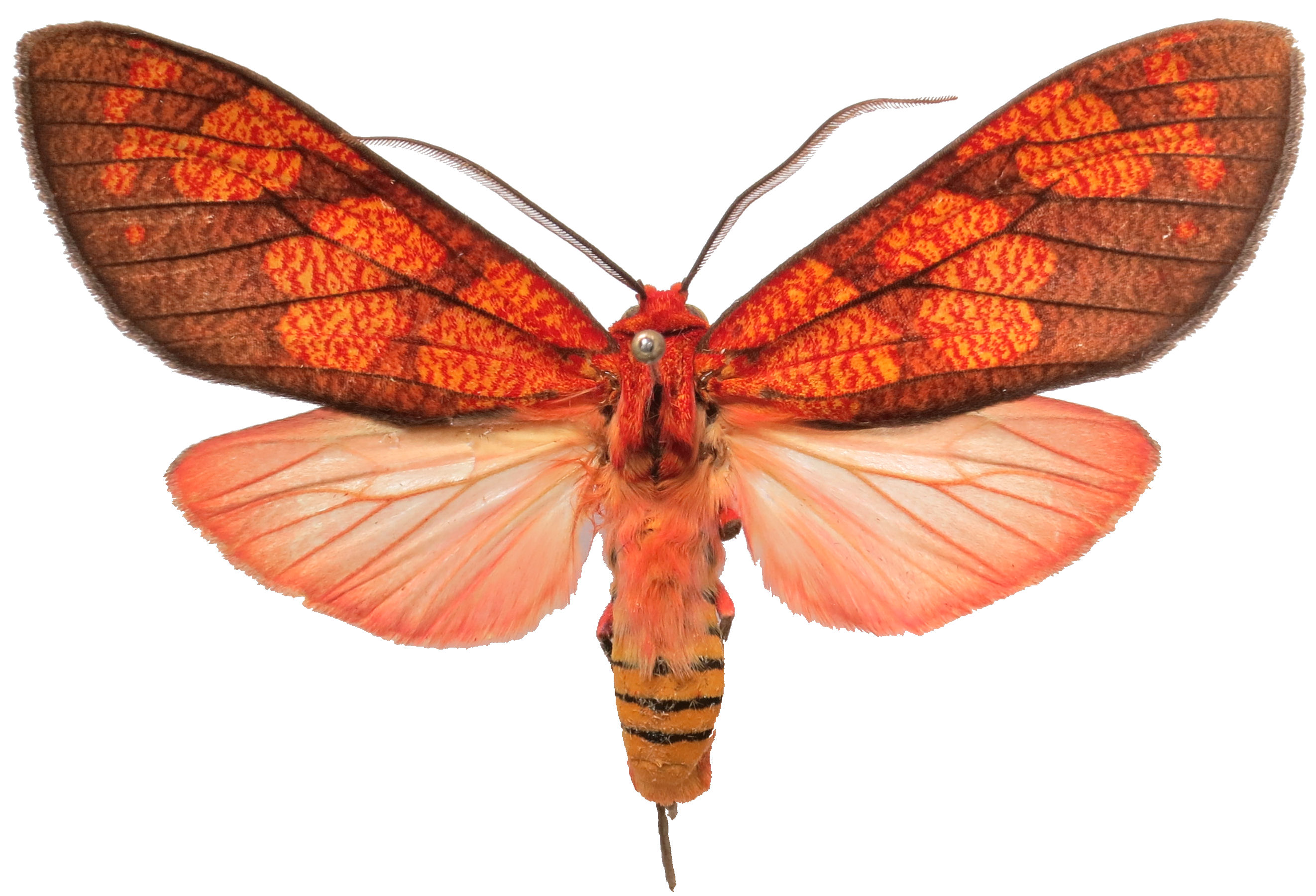
- E. ruffin, Caranavi Province, Yungas, Bolivia

Scientific classification
- Domain: Eukaryota
- Kingdom: Animalia
- Phylum: Arthropoda
- Class: Insecta
- Order: Lepidoptera
- Superfamily: Noctuoidea
- Family: Erebidae
- Subfamily: Arctiinae
- Genus: Elysius
- Species: E. ruffin

Binomial name
- Elysius ruffin Schaus, 1924

= Elysius ruffin =

Species of moth

Elysius ruffin is a moth of the family Erebidae. It was described by William Schaus in 1924. It is found in French Guiana, Brazil, Venezuela, Ecuador and Peru.
