= Opharus morosa =

Scientific classification
- Domain: Eukaryota
- Kingdom: Animalia
- Phylum: Arthropoda
- Class: Insecta
- Order: Lepidoptera
- Superfamily: Noctuoidea
- Family: Erebidae
- Subfamily: Arctiinae
- Genus: Opharus
- Species: O. morosa

Binomial name
- Opharus morosa Schaus, 1892

Species of moth

Opharus morosa is a moth of the family Erebidae. It was described by William Schaus in 1892. It is found in Peru.
