= Pelochyta fergusoni =

Scientific classification
- Domain: Eukaryota
- Kingdom: Animalia
- Phylum: Arthropoda
- Class: Insecta
- Order: Lepidoptera
- Superfamily: Noctuoidea
- Family: Erebidae
- Subfamily: Arctiinae
- Genus: Pelochyta
- Species: P. fergusoni

Binomial name
- Pelochyta fergusoni Watson & Goodger, 1986

Synonyms
- Pelochyta pallida Dognin, 1910 (preocc. Schaus, 1901)

Species of moth

Pelochyta fergusoni is a moth of the family Erebidae. It was described by Watson and Goodger in 1986. It is found in Peru.
