= Elysius superba =

Scientific classification
- Domain: Eukaryota
- Kingdom: Animalia
- Phylum: Arthropoda
- Class: Insecta
- Order: Lepidoptera
- Superfamily: Noctuoidea
- Family: Erebidae
- Subfamily: Arctiinae
- Genus: Elysius
- Species: E. superba

Binomial name
- Elysius superba (H. Druce, 1884)

Synonyms
- Phaegoptera superba H. Druce, 1884

Species of moth

Elysius superba is a moth of the family Erebidae. It was described by Herbert Druce in 1884. It is found in Mexico, Costa Rica and Panama.
