= Elysius deceptura =

Scientific classification
- Domain: Eukaryota
- Kingdom: Animalia
- Phylum: Arthropoda
- Class: Insecta
- Order: Lepidoptera
- Superfamily: Noctuoidea
- Family: Erebidae
- Subfamily: Arctiinae
- Genus: Elysius
- Species: E. deceptura

Binomial name
- Elysius deceptura (H. Druce, 1905)

Synonyms
- Ischnocampa deceptura H. Druce, 1905; Pelochyta nabor Schaus, 1924; Pelochyta songoa Schaus, 1933

Species of moth

Elysius deceptura is a moth of the family Erebidae. It was described by Herbert Druce in 1905. It is found in Peru.
