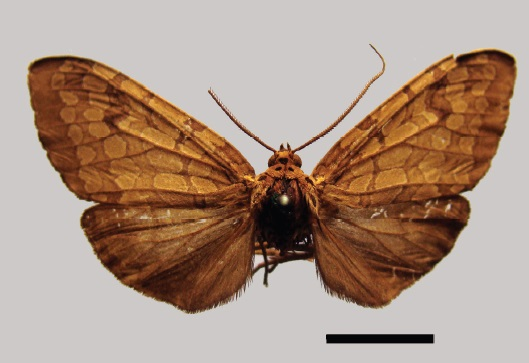

Scientific classification
- Kingdom: Animalia
- Phylum: Arthropoda
- Class: Insecta
- Order: Lepidoptera
- Superfamily: Noctuoidea
- Family: Erebidae
- Subfamily: Arctiinae
- Genus: Opharus
- Species: O. picturata

Binomial name
- Opharus picturata (Burmeister, 1878)

Synonyms
- Halysidota picturata Burmeister, 1878; Phaegoptera picturata; Opharus brunnea Gaede, 1923

= Opharus picturata =

Species of moth

Opharus picturata is a moth of the family Erebidae. It was described by Hermann Burmeister in 1878. It is found in Uruguay, Argentina and Brazil.
