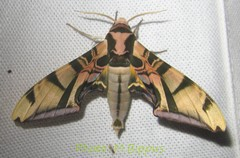

Scientific classification
- Domain: Eukaryota
- Kingdom: Animalia
- Phylum: Arthropoda
- Class: Insecta
- Order: Lepidoptera
- Family: Sphingidae
- Genus: Batocnema
- Species: B. coquerelii

Binomial name
- Batocnema coquerelii (Boisduval, 1875)

Synonyms
- Ambulyx coquerelii Boisduval, 1875

= Batocnema coquerelii =

Species of moth

Batocnema coquerelii is a moth of the family Sphingidae. It is known from Madagascar, the Aldabra Islands and the Comoro Islands.

It is similar to Batocnema africanus, but the general pattern comprises a much better developed series of bands and patches. The forewing upperside has six, rather than two, conspicuous costal patches and stripes, the most apical of which is small, triangular and subapical.

== Subspecies ==
- Batocnema coquerelii coquerelii (Madagascar)
- Batocnema coquerelii aldabrensis - Aurivillius, 1909 (Aldabra Island)
- Batocnema coquerelii anjouanensis - Viette, 1982 (Anjouan)
- Batocnema coquerelii comorana - Rothschild & Jordan, 1903 (Grande Comore)
- Batocnema coquerelii occidentalis - Griveaud, 1971 (Madagascar)
