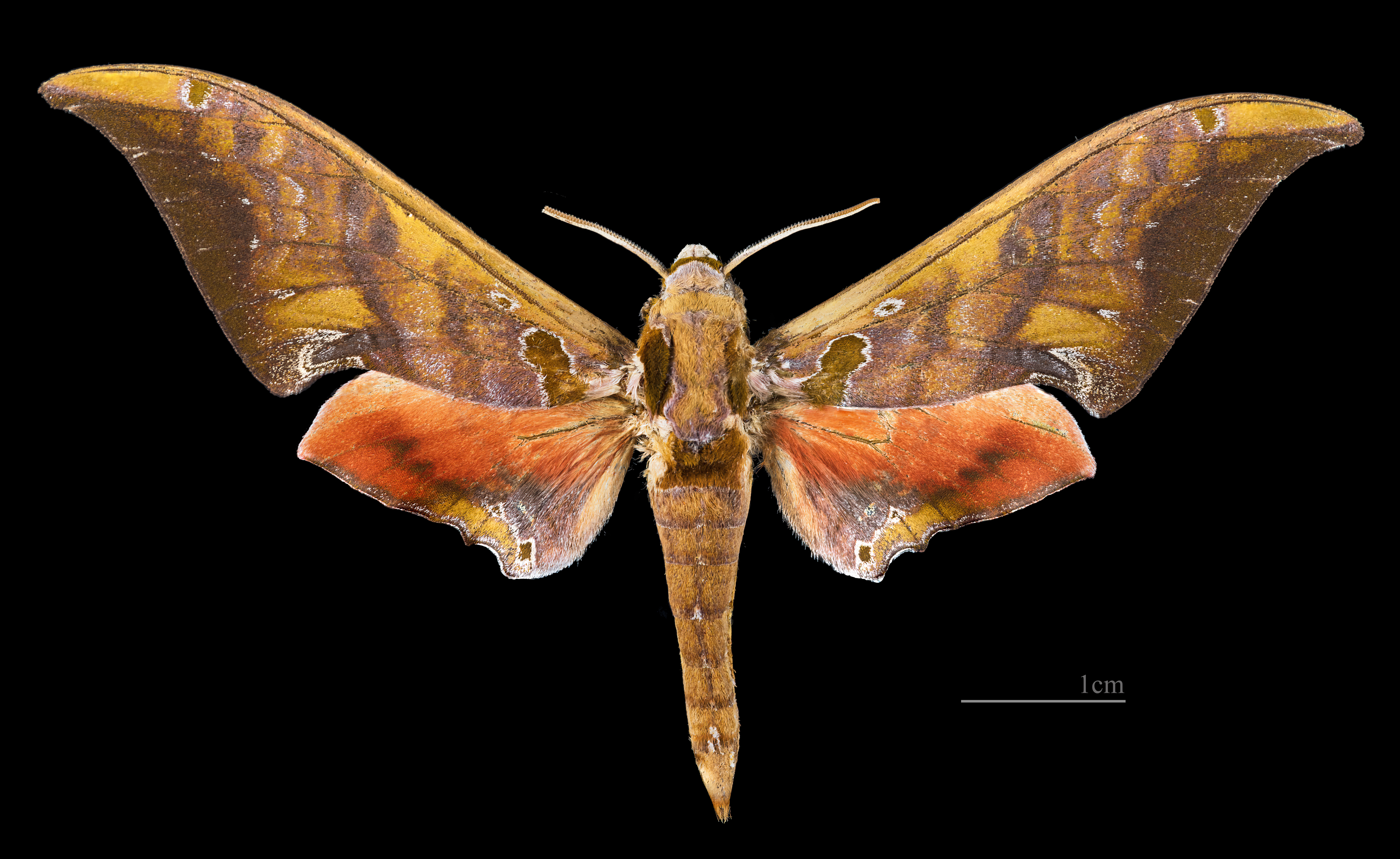
- Male dorsal
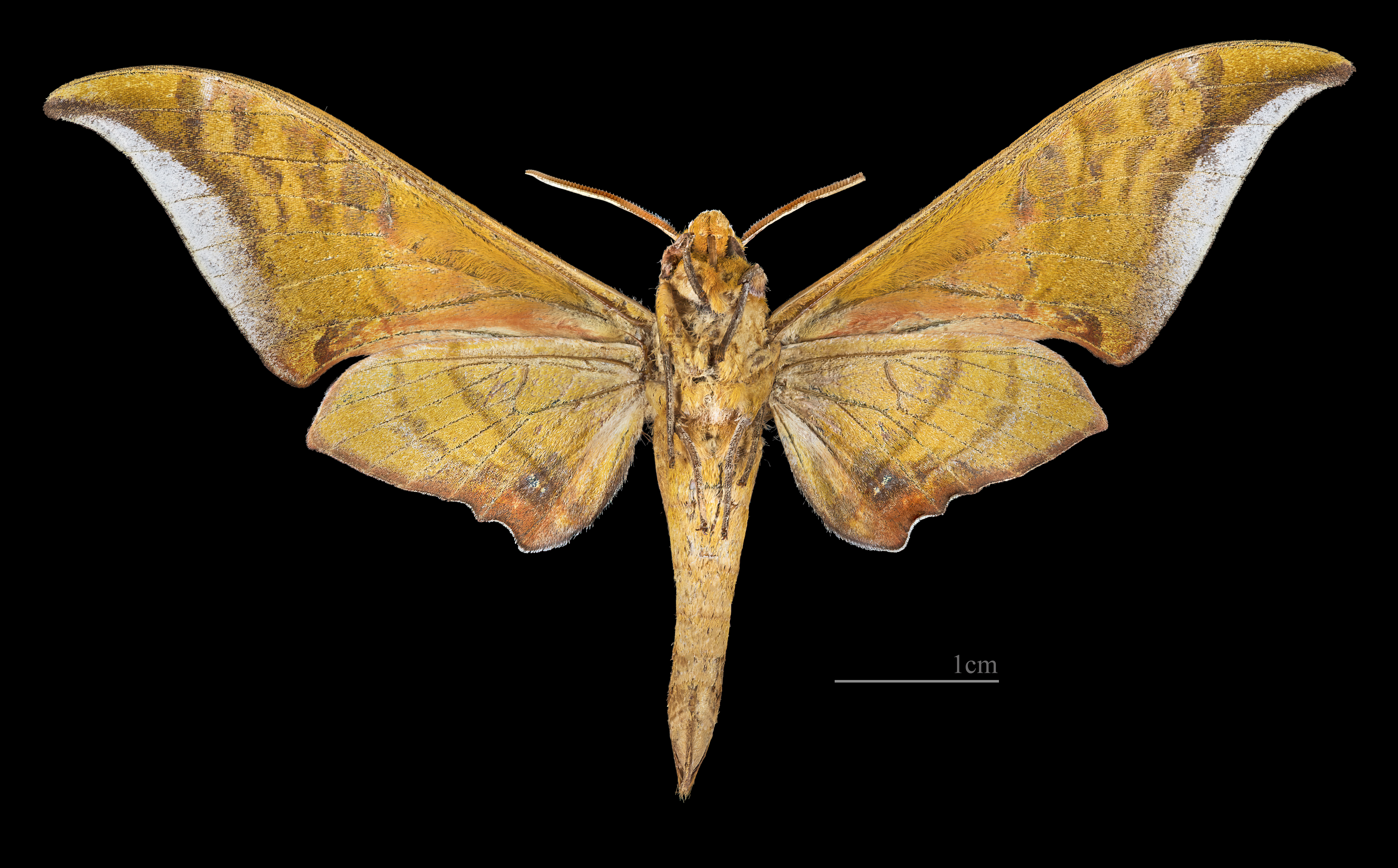
- Male ventral

Scientific classification
- Domain: Eukaryota
- Kingdom: Animalia
- Phylum: Arthropoda
- Class: Insecta
- Order: Lepidoptera
- Family: Sphingidae
- Genus: Orecta
- Species: O. fruhstorferi

Binomial name
- Orecta fruhstorferi Clark, 1916

= Orecta fruhstorferi =

Species of moth

Orecta fruhstorferi is a species of moth of the family Sphingidae. It is known from Venezuela.

The length of the forewings is about 34 mm. It is similar to Orecta lycidas but darker and more strongly marked. The forewing and hindwing upperside markings are chocolate brown, light brown on the forewing or reddish-brown on the hindwing.
