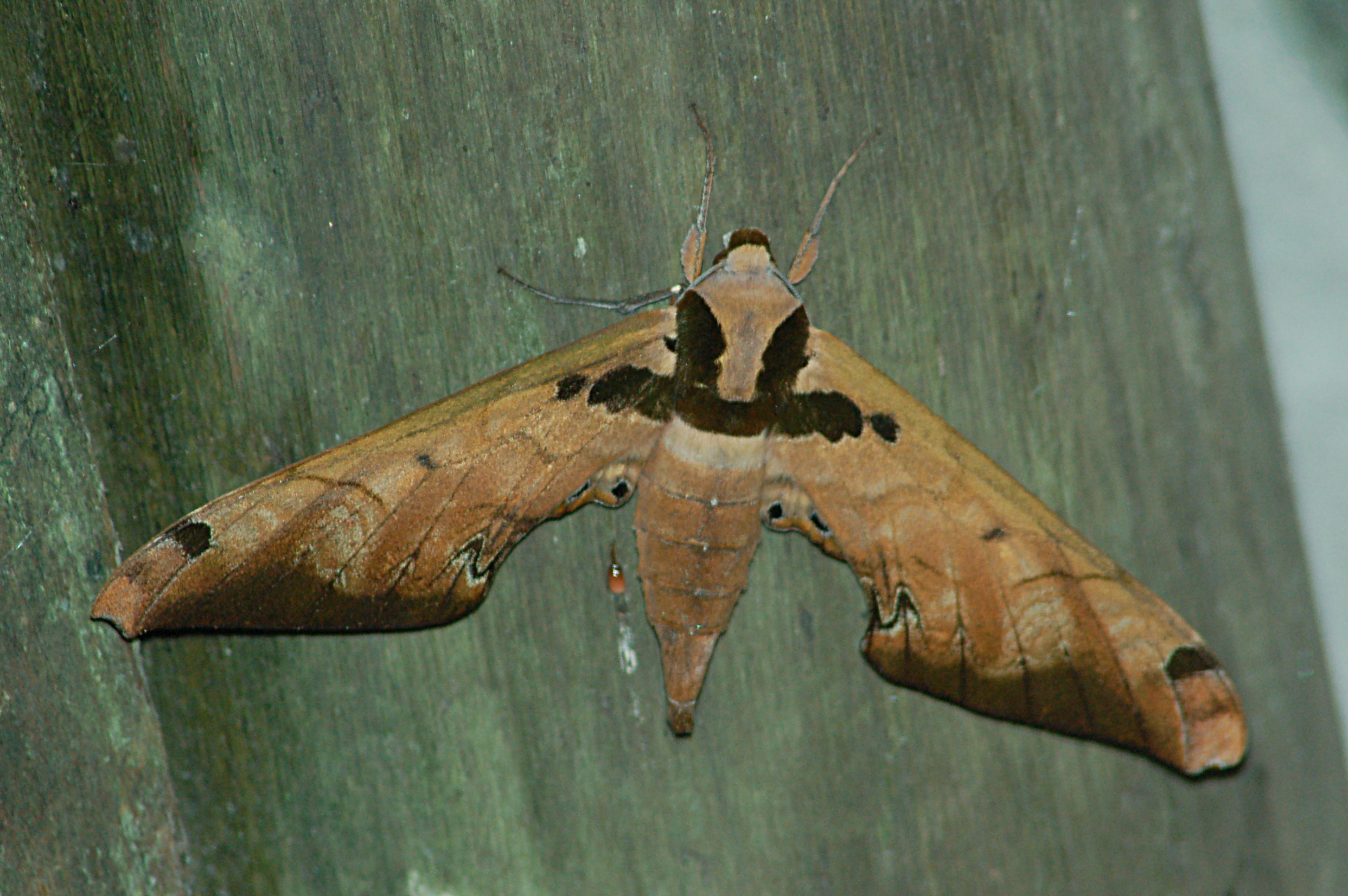
- Adhemarius sexoculata from Napo Province, Ecuador

Scientific classification
- Kingdom: Animalia
- Phylum: Arthropoda
- Class: Insecta
- Order: Lepidoptera
- Family: Sphingidae
- Subfamily: Smerinthinae
- Tribe: Ambulycini
- Genus: Adhemarius
- Species: A. sexoculata

Binomial name
- Adhemarius sexoculata (Grote, 1865)

Synonyms
- Ambulyx sexoculata Grote, 1865; Ambulyx depuiseti Oberthür, 1881

= Adhemarius sexoculata =

Species of moth

Adhemarius sexoculata is a species of moth in the family Sphingidae. It was described by Augustus Radcliffe Grote in 1865.

== Distribution ==
Is known from Brazil, Venezuela, Ecuador, Bolivia and Peru.

== Description ==
The length of the forewings is 55–61 mm. There are at least two generations per year with peak flights in February and from July to August.

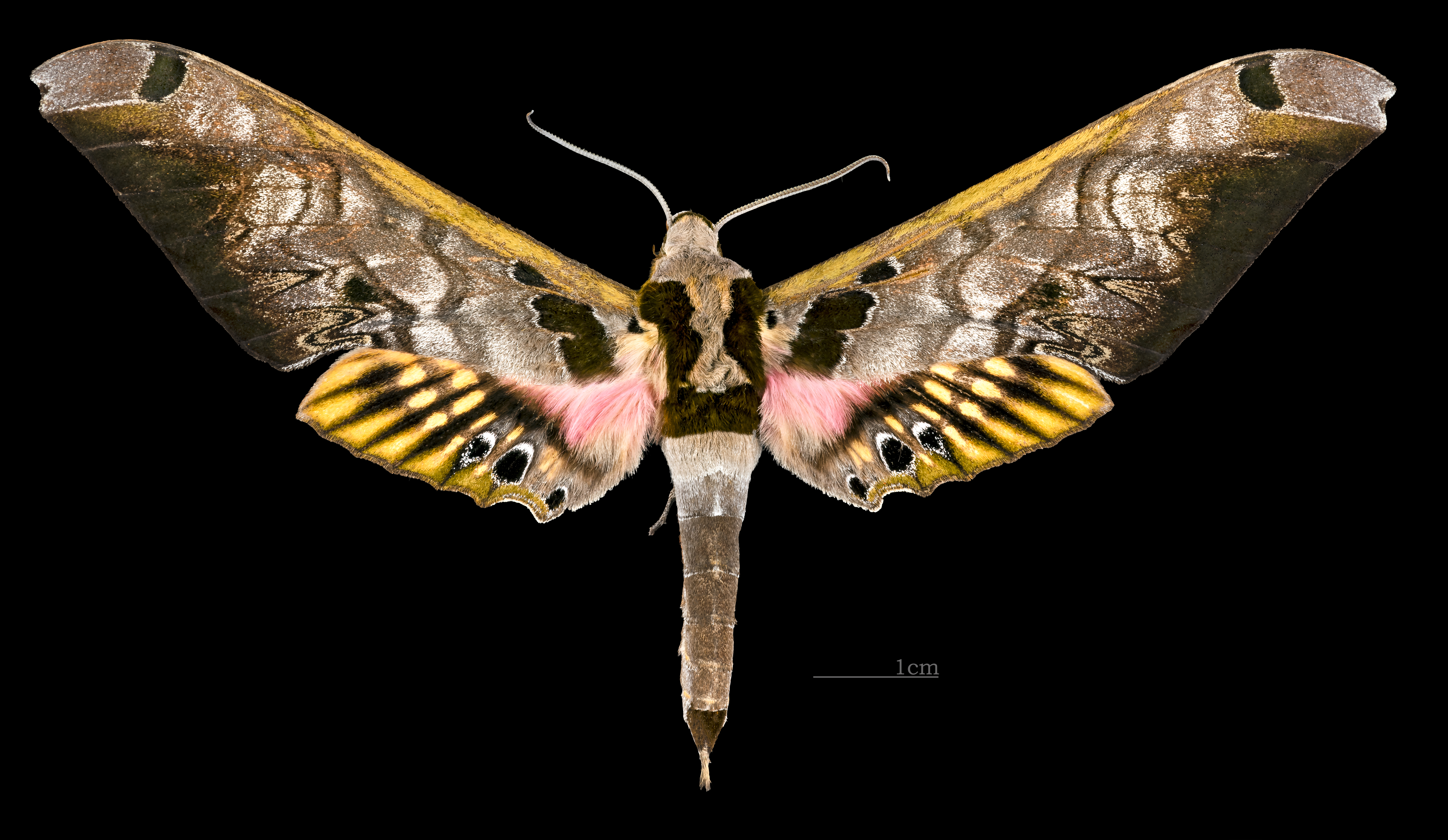
Male dorsal

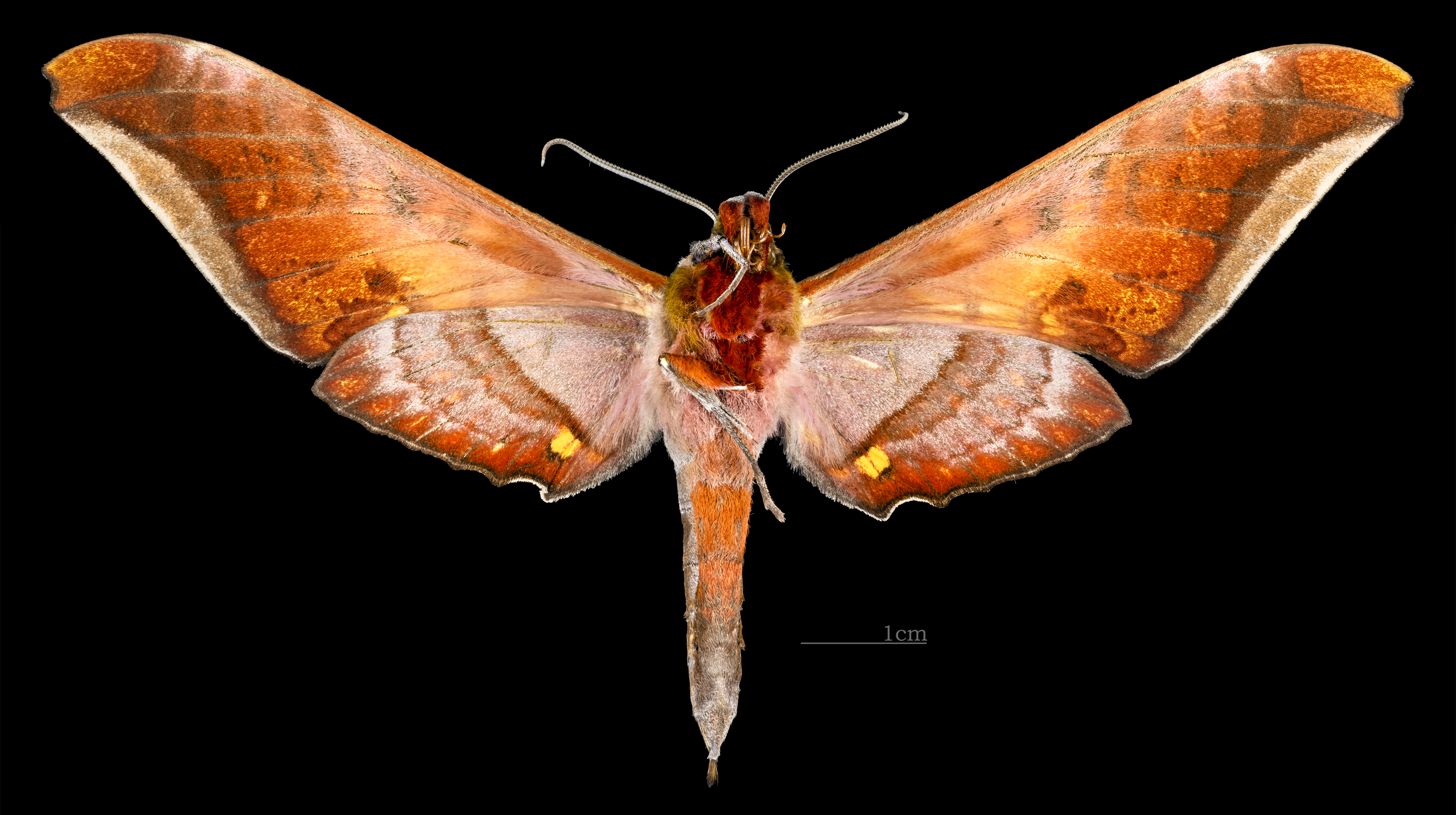
Male ventral

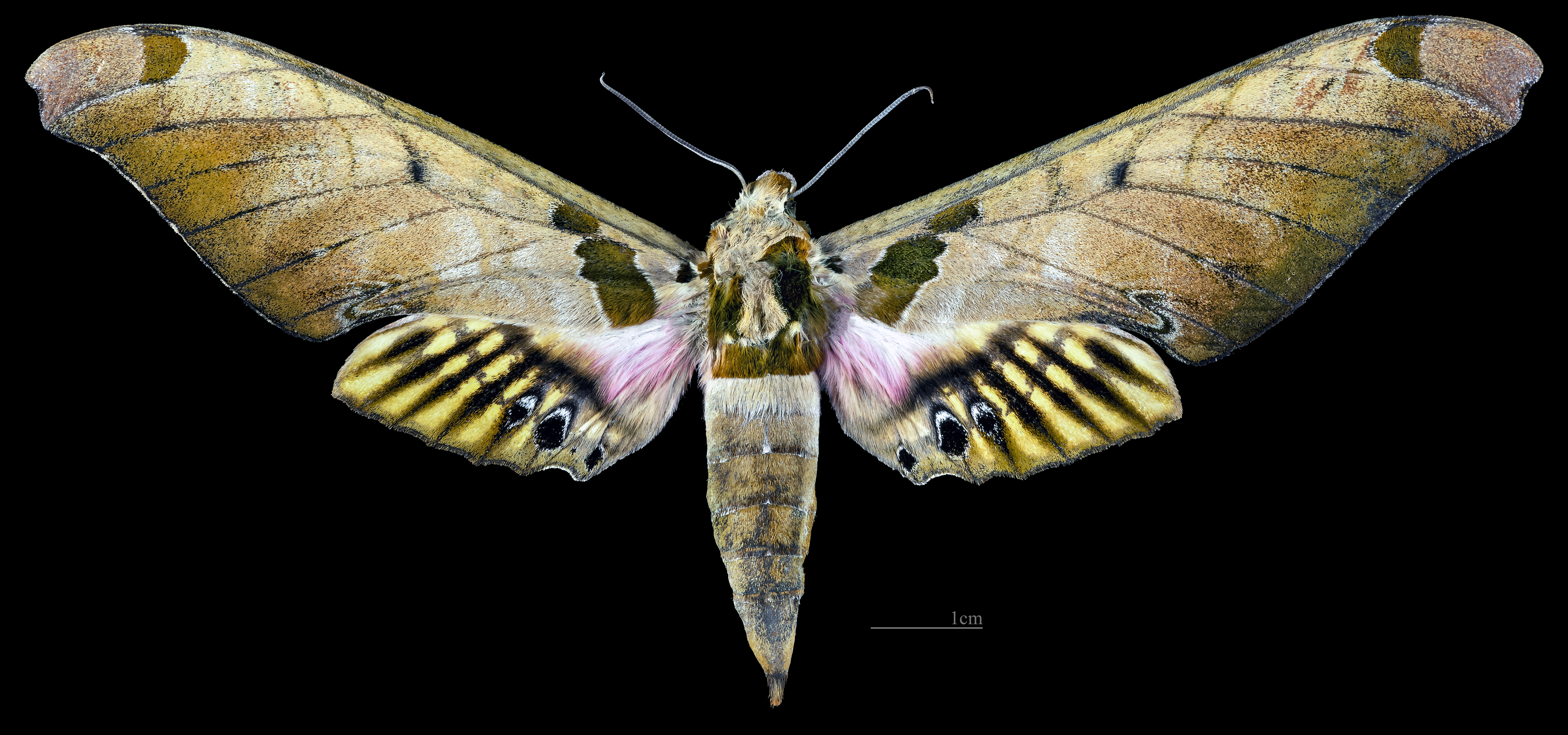
Female dorsal

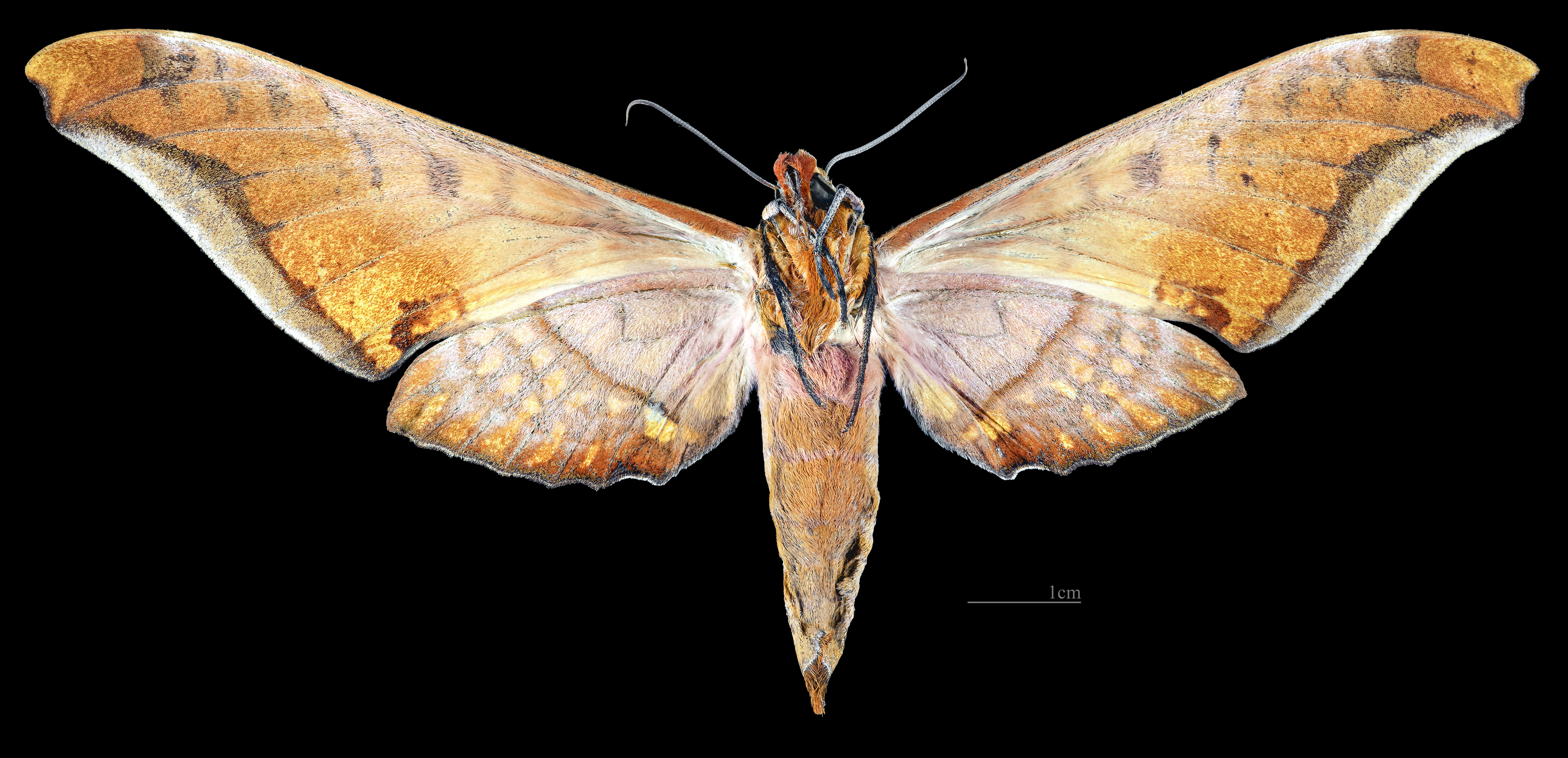
Female dorsal

== Biology ==
The larvae feed on Ocotea atirrensis, Ocotea dendrodaphne, and Ocotea veraguensis.
