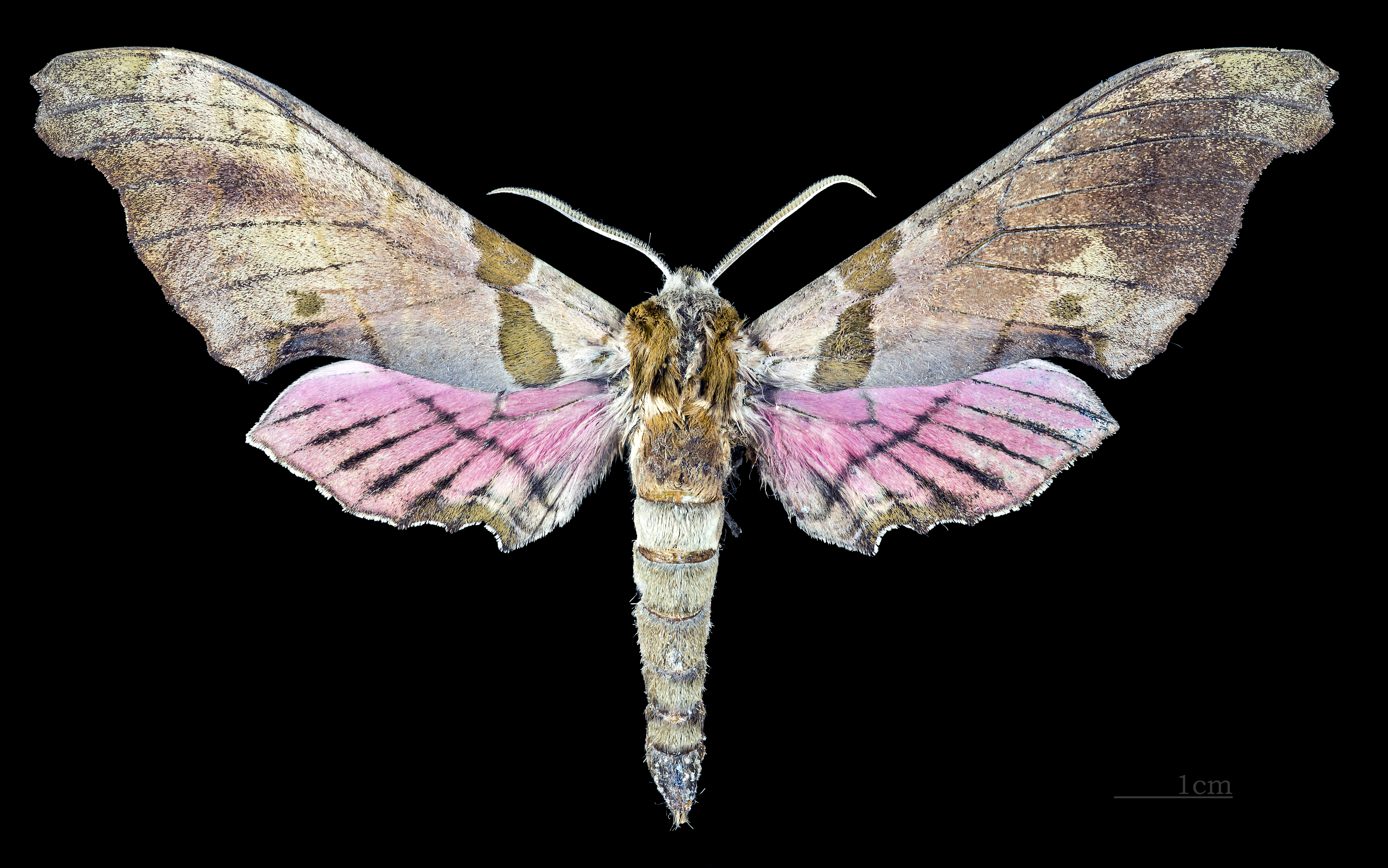
- Dorsal of male MHNT
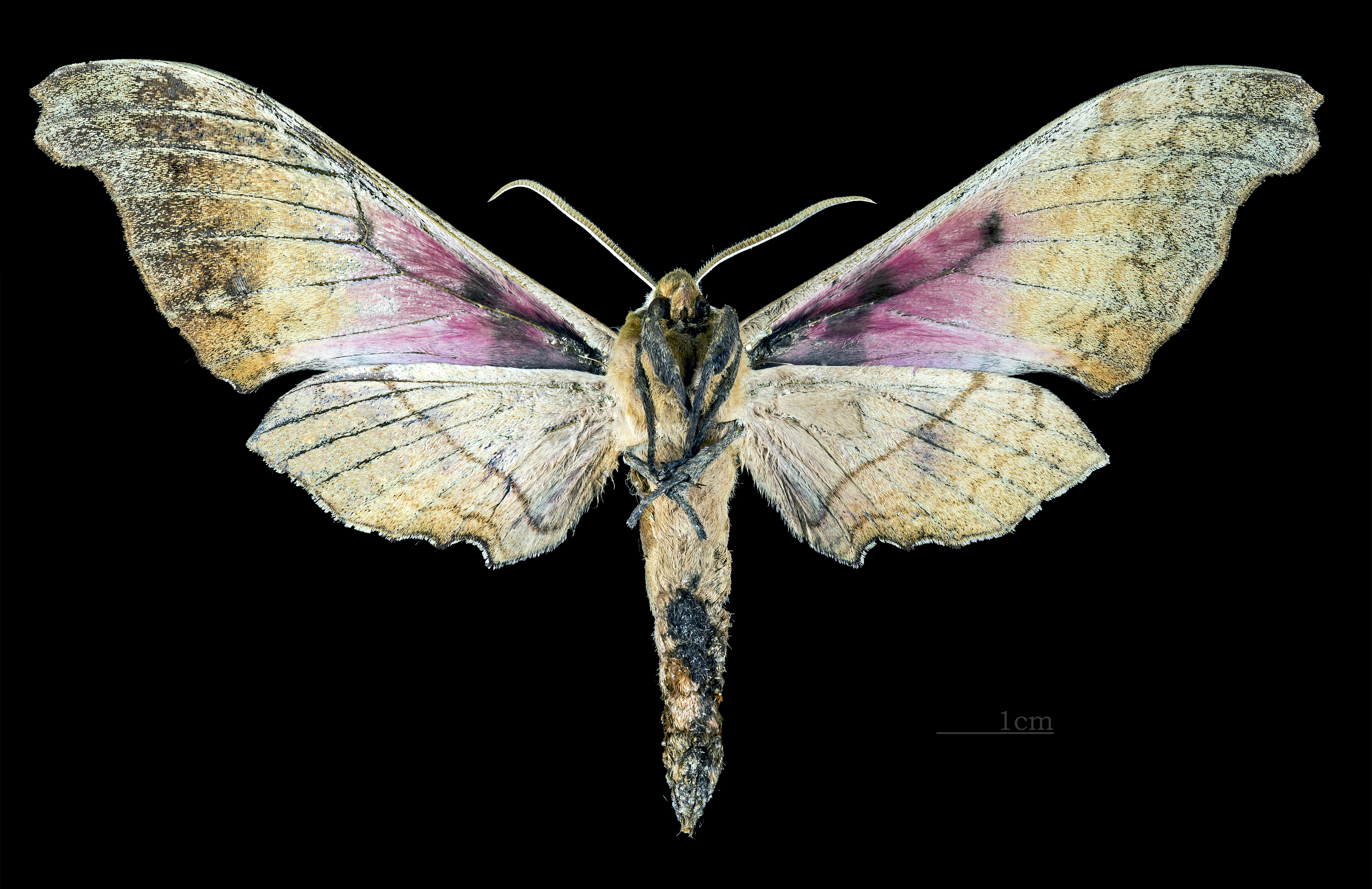
- Ventral of male MHNT

Scientific classification
- Domain: Eukaryota
- Kingdom: Animalia
- Phylum: Arthropoda
- Class: Insecta
- Order: Lepidoptera
- Family: Sphingidae
- Tribe: Ambulycini
- Genus: Trogolegnum; Rothschild & Jordan, 1903
- Species: T. pseudambulyx

Binomial name
- Trogolegnum pseudambulyx (Boisduval, 1875)

Synonyms
- Smerinthus pseudambulyx Boisduval, 1875

= Trogolegnum =

Genus of moths

Trogolegnum is a genus of moths in the family Sphingidae, containing only one species, Trogolegnum pseudambulyx, which is known from Mexico.

== Description ==
The forewing is strongly excavate below the apex especially in males. The proboscis is very short and weak. The forewing colour and pattern are similar to Adhemarius donysa but the subbasal band extends to the costal edge.
