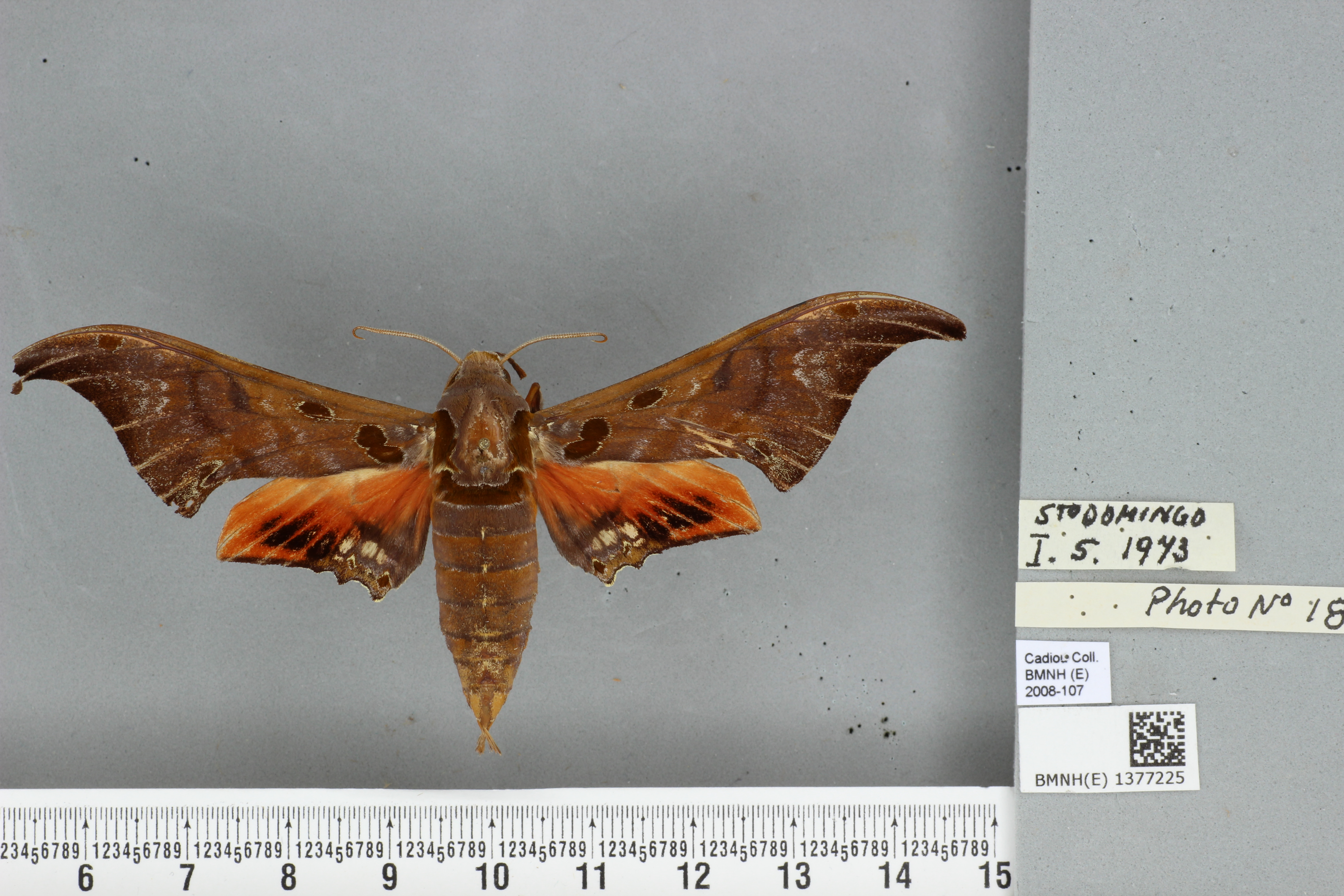

Scientific classification
- Kingdom: Animalia
- Phylum: Arthropoda
- Clade: Pancrustacea
- Class: Insecta
- Order: Lepidoptera
- Family: Sphingidae
- Genus: Orecta
- Species: O. venedictoffae

Binomial name
- Orecta venedictoffae Cadiou, 1995

= Orecta venedictoffae =

Species of moth

Orecta venedictoffae is a species of moth of the family Sphingidae. It is known from Ecuador and Costa Rica.

Adults have been recorded in mid June and early July in Costa Rica.
