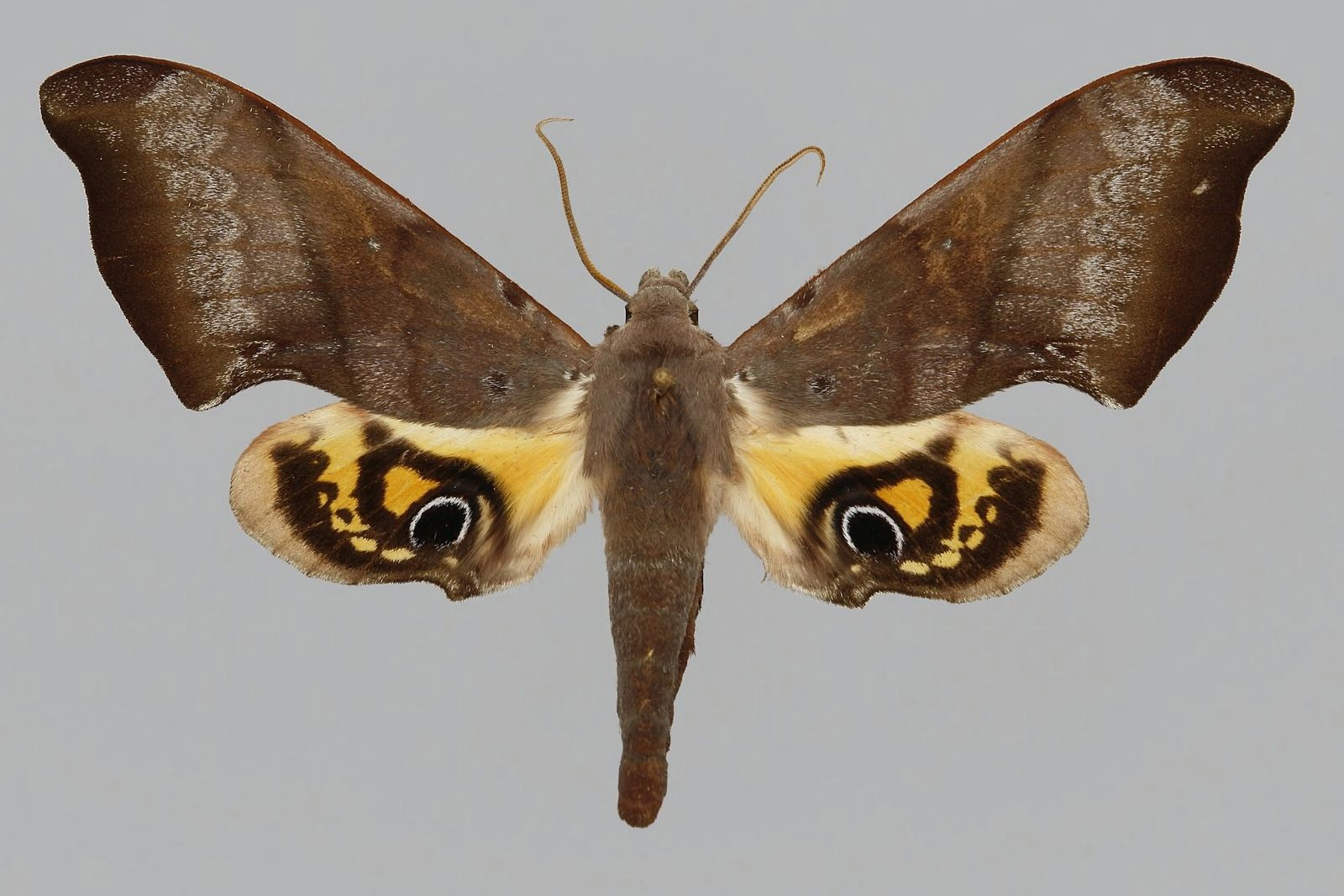
- Male

Scientific classification
- Kingdom: Animalia
- Phylum: Arthropoda
- Clade: Pancrustacea
- Class: Insecta
- Order: Lepidoptera
- Family: Sphingidae
- Tribe: Ambulycini
- Genus: Compsulyx; Holloway, 1979
- Species: C. cochereaui

Binomial name
- Compsulyx cochereaui (Viette, 1971)

Synonyms
- Compsogene cochereaui Viette, 1971

= Compsulyx =

Compsulyx cochereaui

Genus of moths

Compsulyx is a genus of moths in the family Sphingidae. It contains only one species, Compsulyx cochereaui, which is known from New Caledonia.
