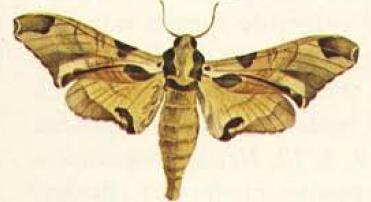
- Batocnema africanus

Scientific classification
- Domain: Eukaryota
- Kingdom: Animalia
- Phylum: Arthropoda
- Class: Insecta
- Order: Lepidoptera
- Family: Sphingidae
- Tribe: Ambulycini
- Genus: Batocnema; Rothschild & Jordan, 1903

= Batocnema =

Genus of moths

Batocnema is a genus of moths in the family Sphingidae first described by Walter Rothschild and Karl Jordan in 1903.

== Species ==
- Batocnema africanus (Distand 1899)
- Batocnema coquerelii (Boisduval 1875)
