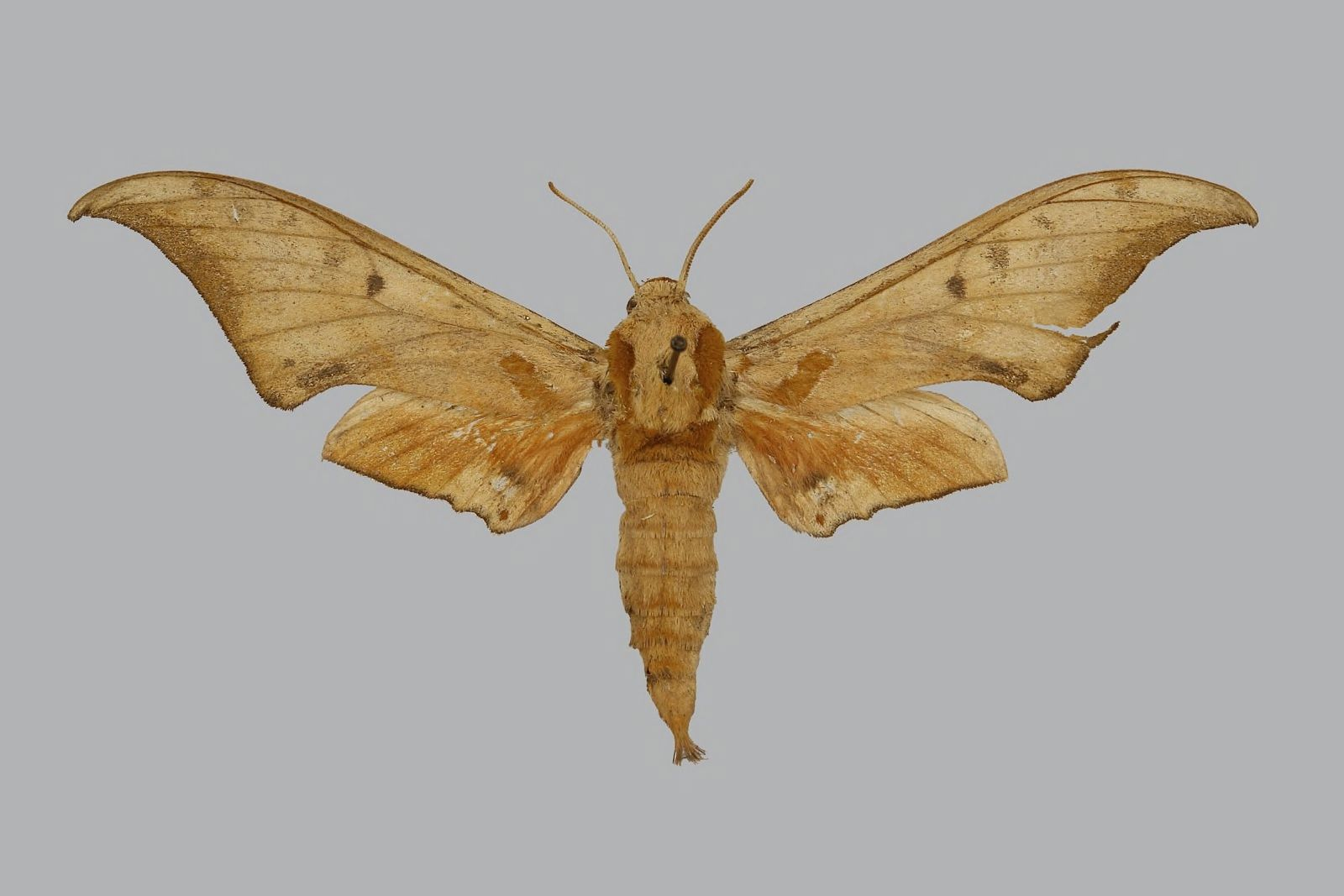

Scientific classification
- Domain: Eukaryota
- Kingdom: Animalia
- Phylum: Arthropoda
- Class: Insecta
- Order: Lepidoptera
- Family: Sphingidae
- Genus: Orecta
- Species: O. acuminata

Binomial name
- Orecta acuminata Clark, 1923

= Orecta acuminata =

Species of Sphingidae moth

Orecta acuminata is a species of moth of the family Sphingidae. It is known from Argentina.

Adults are on wing in January.
