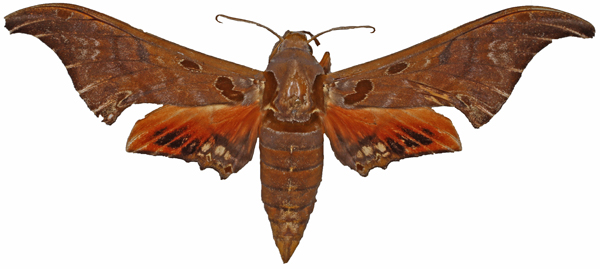
- Orecta venedictoffae holotype male upperside

Scientific classification
- Domain: Eukaryota
- Kingdom: Animalia
- Phylum: Arthropoda
- Class: Insecta
- Order: Lepidoptera
- Family: Sphingidae
- Tribe: Ambulycini
- Genus: Orecta; Rothschild & Jordan, 1903

= Orecta =

Genus of moths

Orecta is a genus of moths in the family Sphingidae first described by Walter Rothschild and Karl Jordan in 1903.

== Species ==
- Orecta acuminata Clark 1923
- Orecta fruhstorferi Clark 1916
- Orecta lycidas (Boisduval 1875)
- Orecta venedictoffae Cadiou 1995
