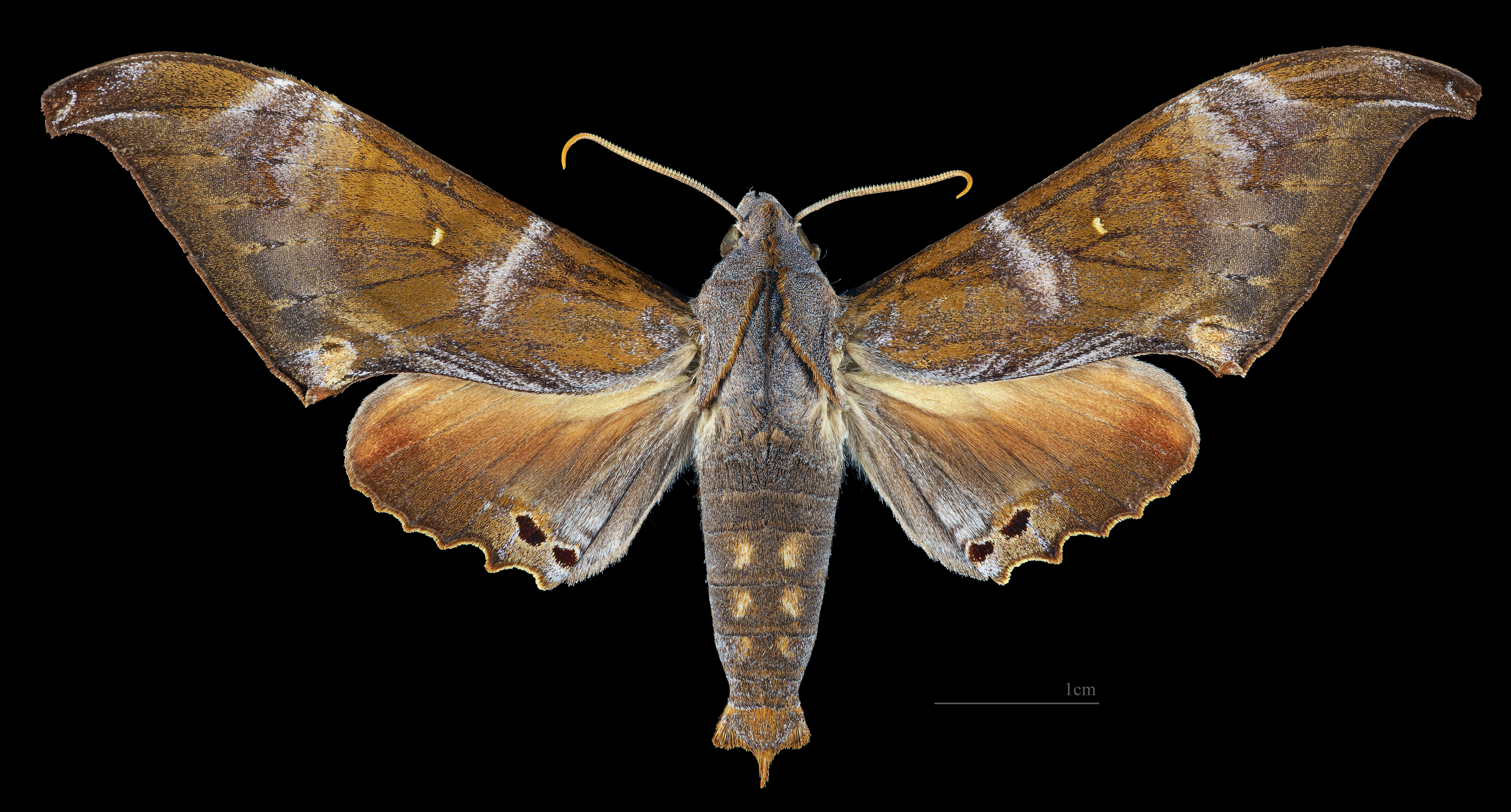
- Male dorsal view
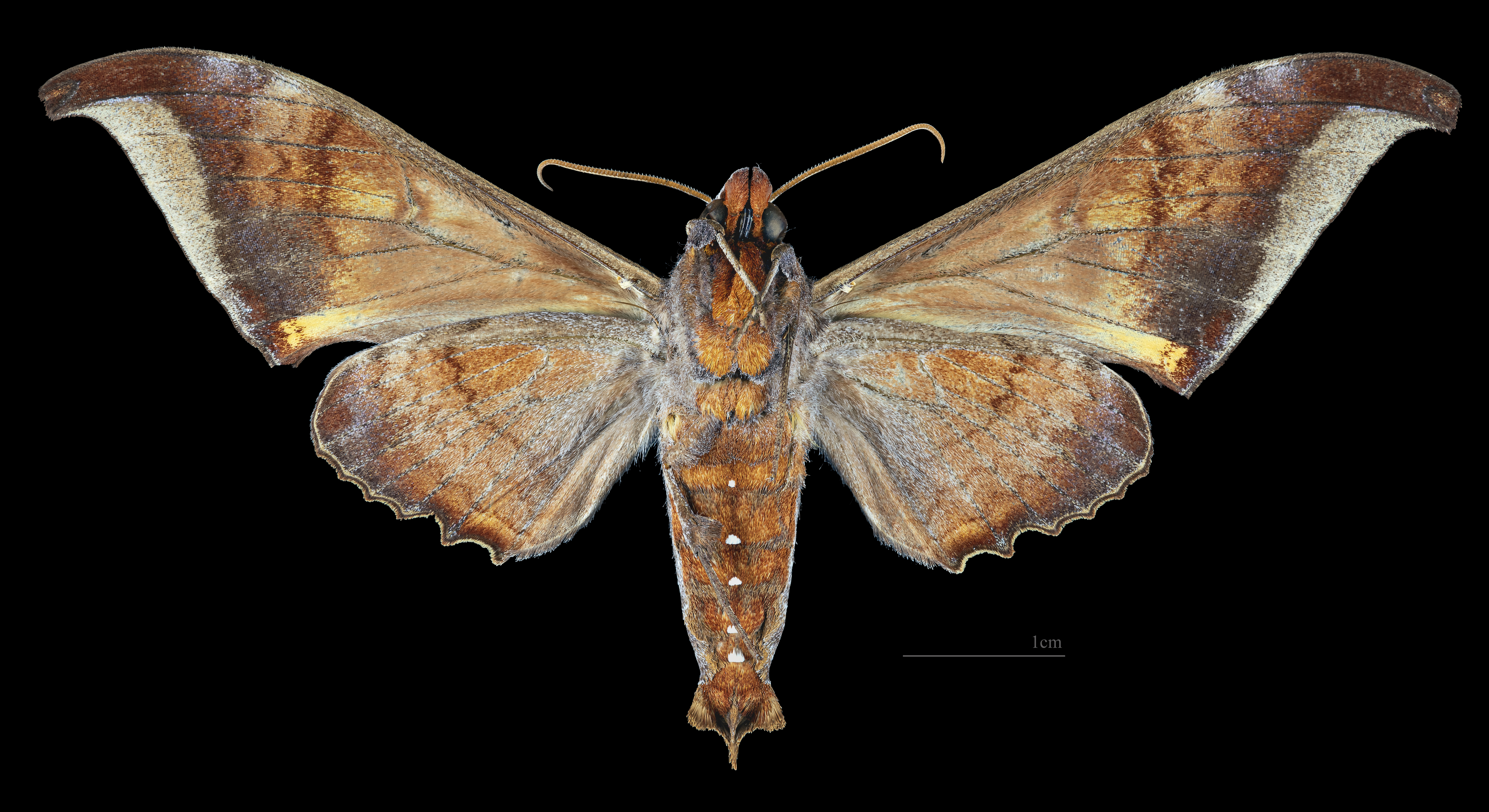
- Male ventral view

Scientific classification
- Domain: Eukaryota
- Kingdom: Animalia
- Phylum: Arthropoda
- Class: Insecta
- Order: Lepidoptera
- Family: Sphingidae
- Tribe: Ambulycini
- Genus: Barbourion; Clark, 1934
- Species: B. lemaii

Binomial name
- Barbourion lemaii (Le Moult, 1933)

Synonyms
- Callambulyx lemaii Le Moult, 1933

= Barbourion =

Single-species genus of moths

Barbourion is monotypic moth genus in the family Sphingidae described by Benjamin Preston Clark in 1934. Its only species, Barbourion lemaii, described by Eugène Le Moult in 1934, is known from Yunnan in south-western China, northern Thailand and northern Vietnam.

Adults have been recorded in March and August above 2,000 meters elevation in Thailand.
