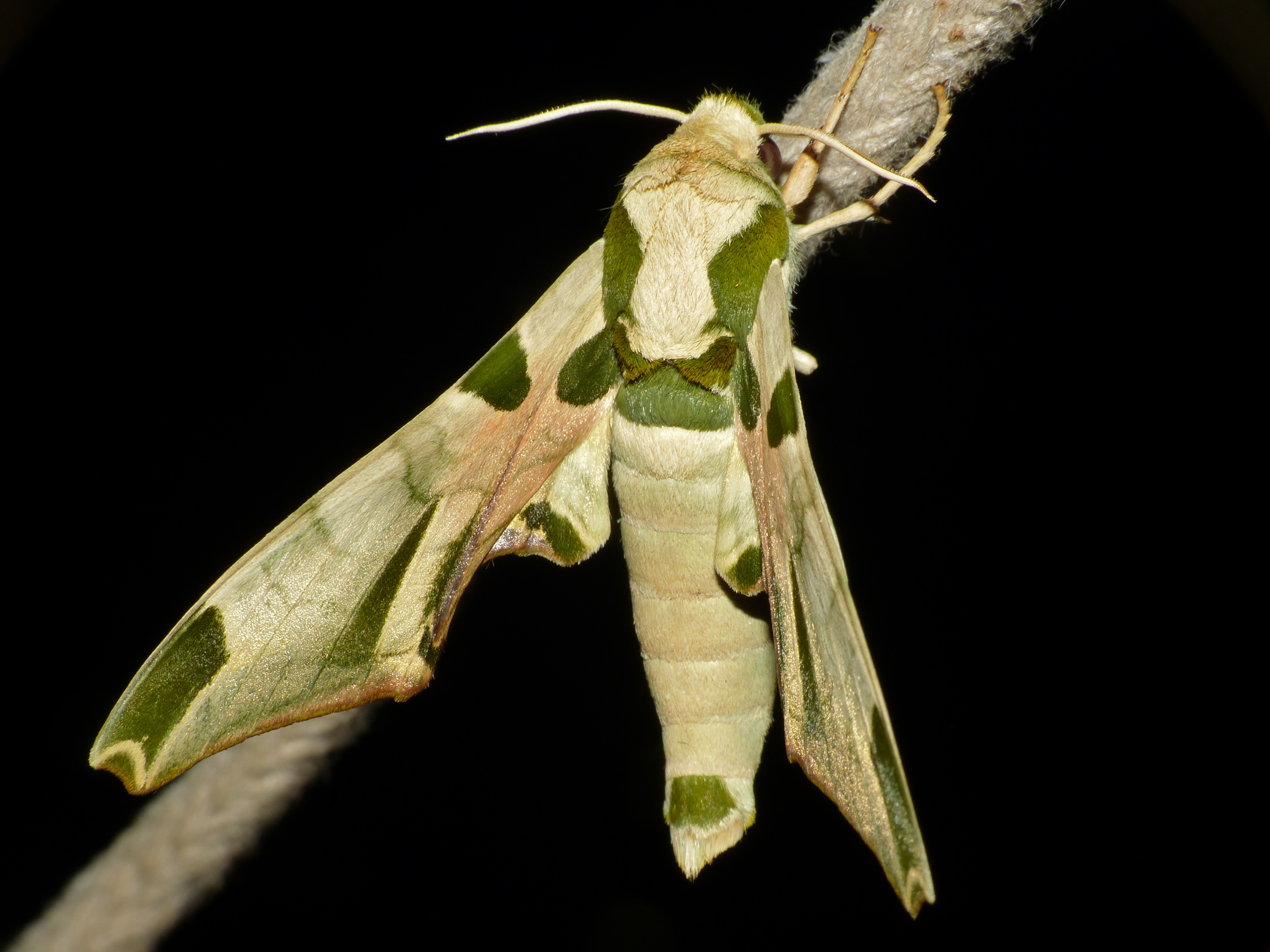

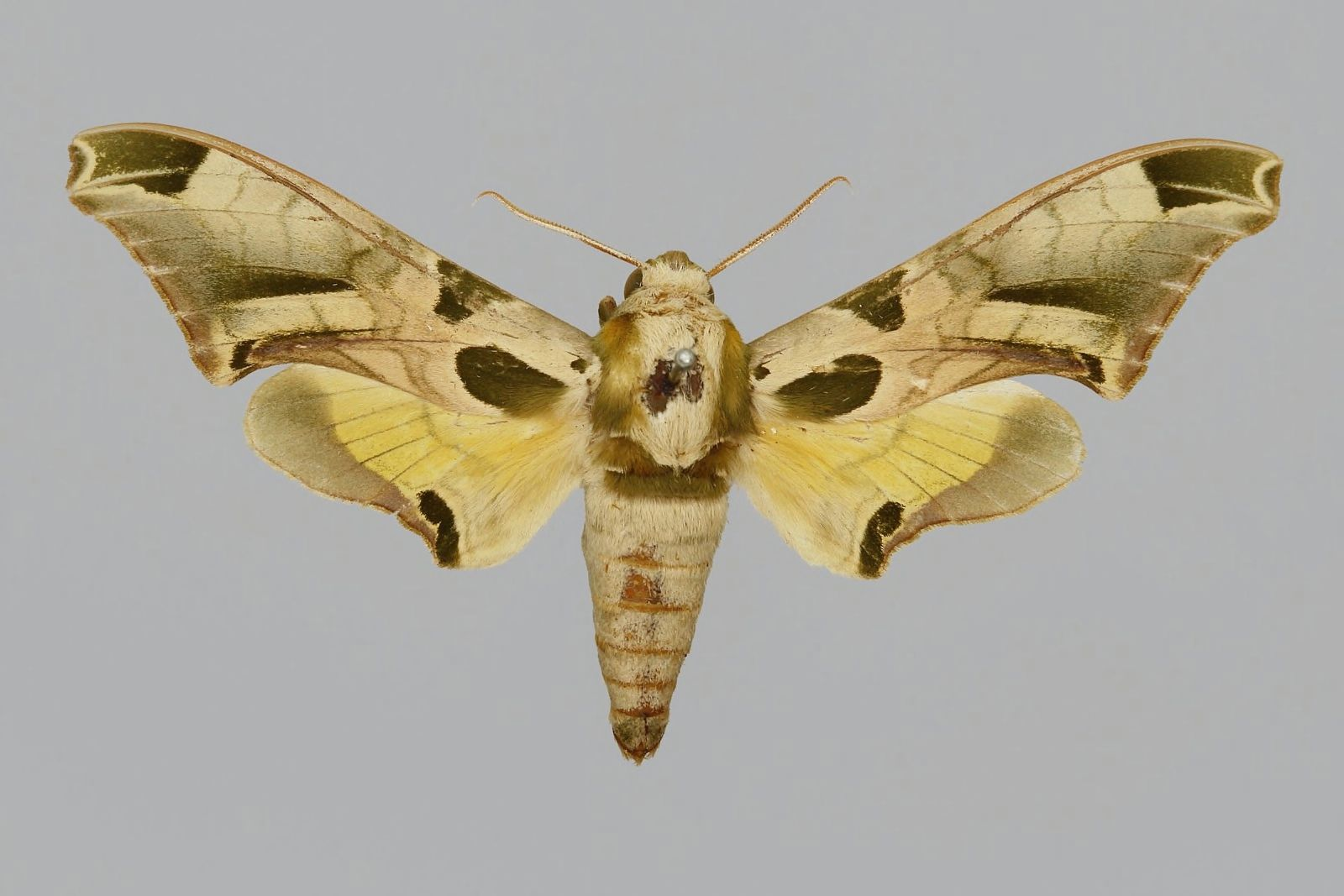

Scientific classification
- Domain: Eukaryota
- Kingdom: Animalia
- Phylum: Arthropoda
- Class: Insecta
- Order: Lepidoptera
- Family: Sphingidae
- Genus: Batocnema
- Species: B. africanus

Binomial name
- Batocnema africanus (Distant, 1899)

Synonyms
- Polyptychus africanus Distant, 1899

= Batocnema africanus =

Species of moth

Batocnema africanus is a moth of the family Sphingidae. It is known from open woodland and savanna from north-eastern South Africa to Zimbabwe, Tanzania and the Kenya coast.

The length of the forewings is 30–33 mm for males and about 35 mm for females and the wingspan is 72–85 mm.

The larvae feed on Sclerocarya afra.
