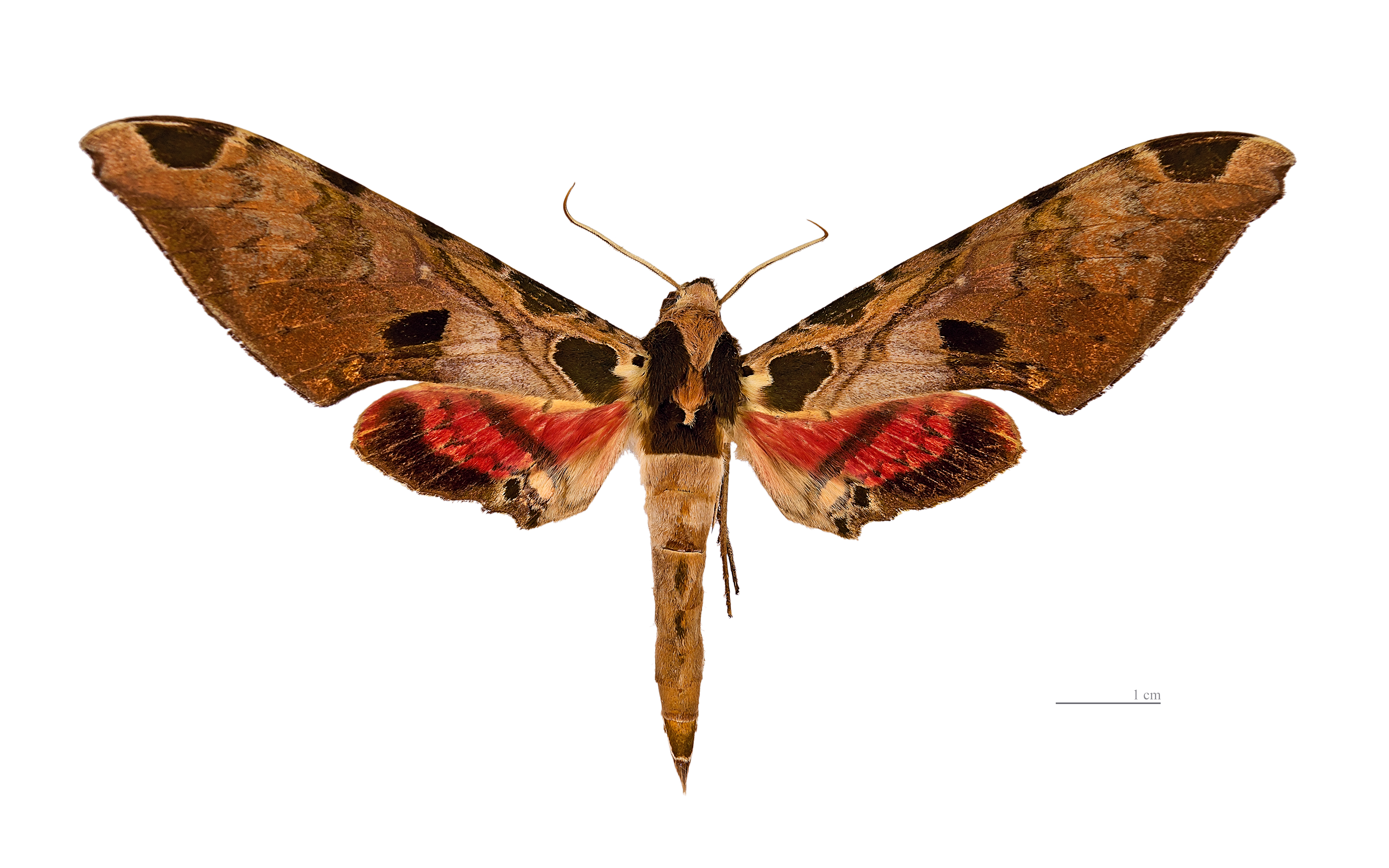
- Adhemarius gannascus

Scientific classification
- Domain: Eukaryota
- Kingdom: Animalia
- Phylum: Arthropoda
- Class: Insecta
- Order: Lepidoptera
- Family: Sphingidae
- Subfamily: Smerinthinae
- Tribe: Ambulycini; Butler, 1876

Genera
- See text

= Ambulycini =

Tribe of moths

Ambulycini is a tribe of moths of the family Sphingidae first described by Arthur Gardiner Butler in 1876.

== Taxonomy ==
- Genus Adhemarius Oitiaca, 1939
- Genus Akbesia Rothschild & Jordan, 1903
- Genus Ambulyx Westwood, 1847
- Genus Amplypterus Hübner, 1819
- Genus Barbourion Clark, 1934
- Genus Batocnema Rothschild & Jordan, 1903
- Genus Compsulyx Holloway, 1979
- Genus Orecta Rothschild & Jordan, 1903
- Genus Protambulyx Rothschild & Jordan, 1903
- Genus Trogolegnum Rothschild & Jordan, 1903

== Gallery ==
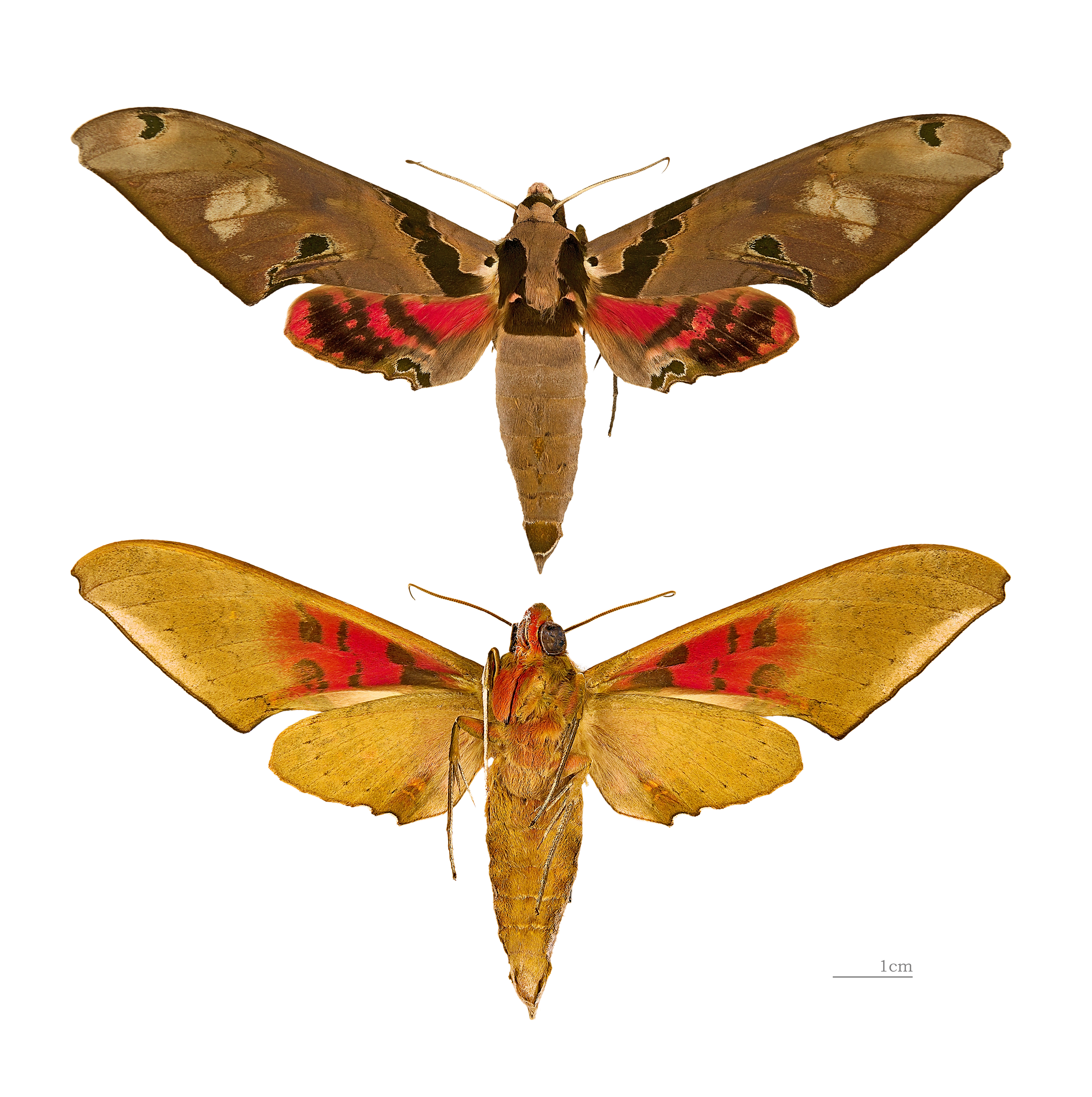
Adhemarius

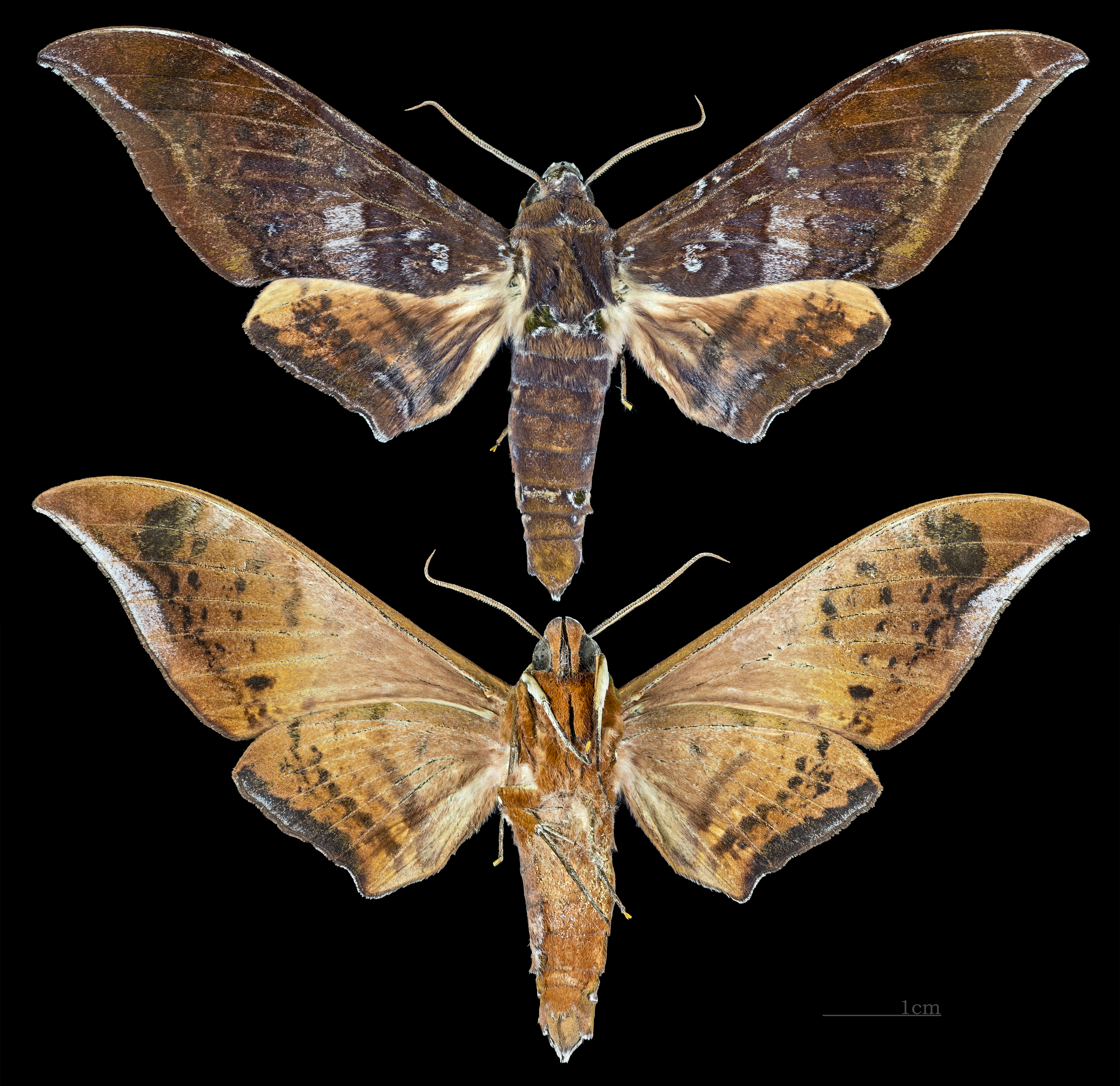
Ambulyx

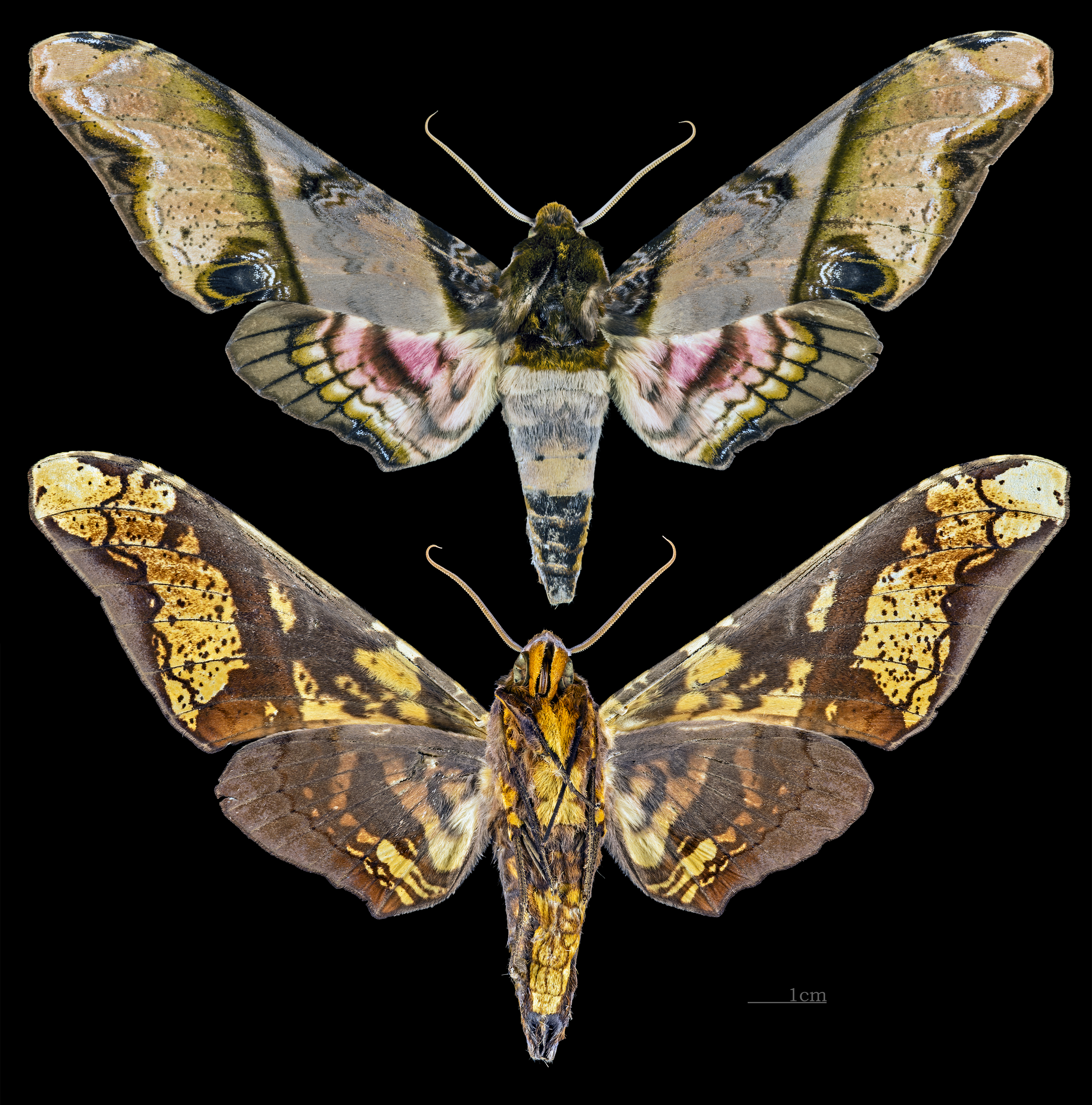
Amplypterus

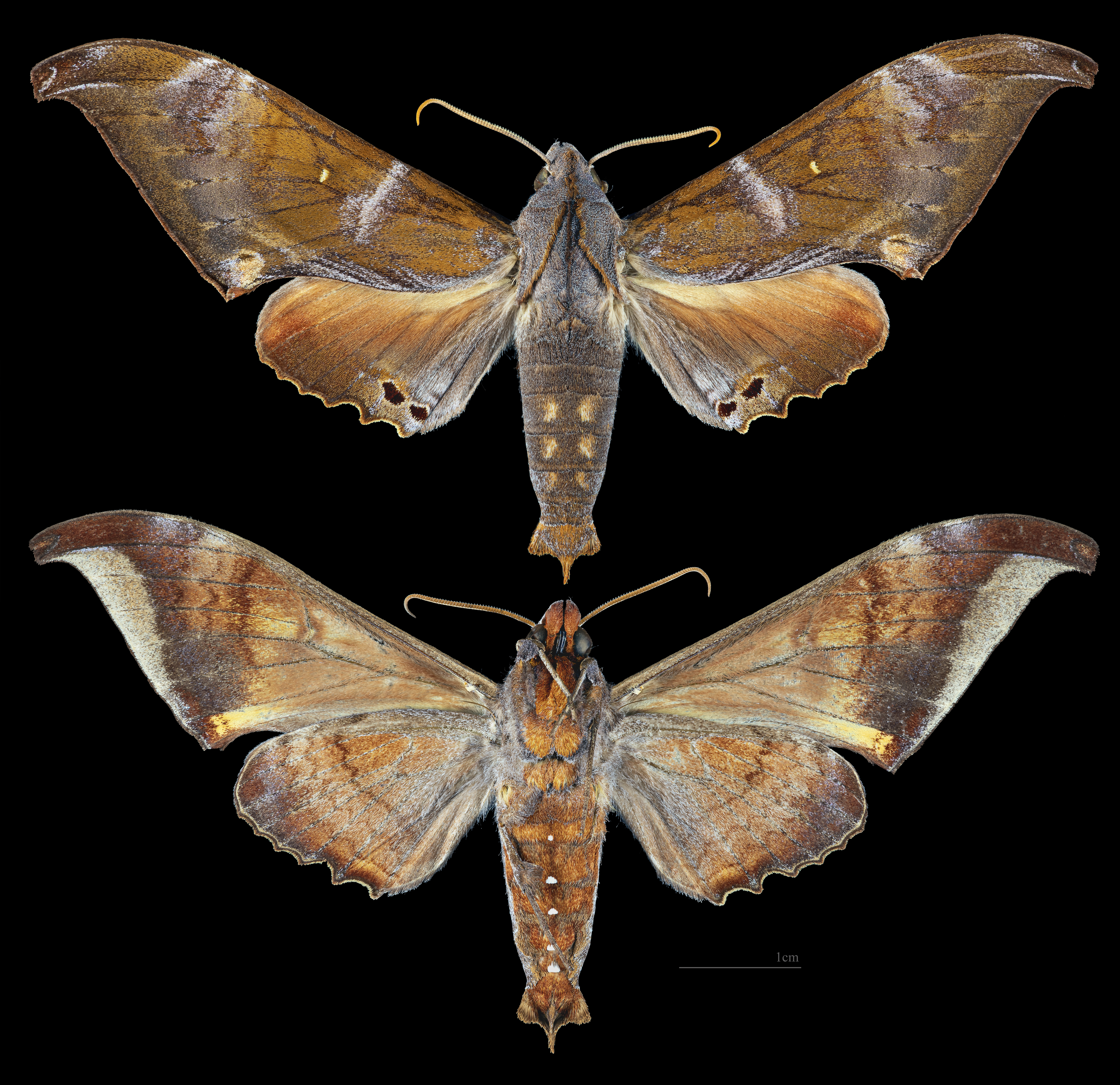
Barbourion

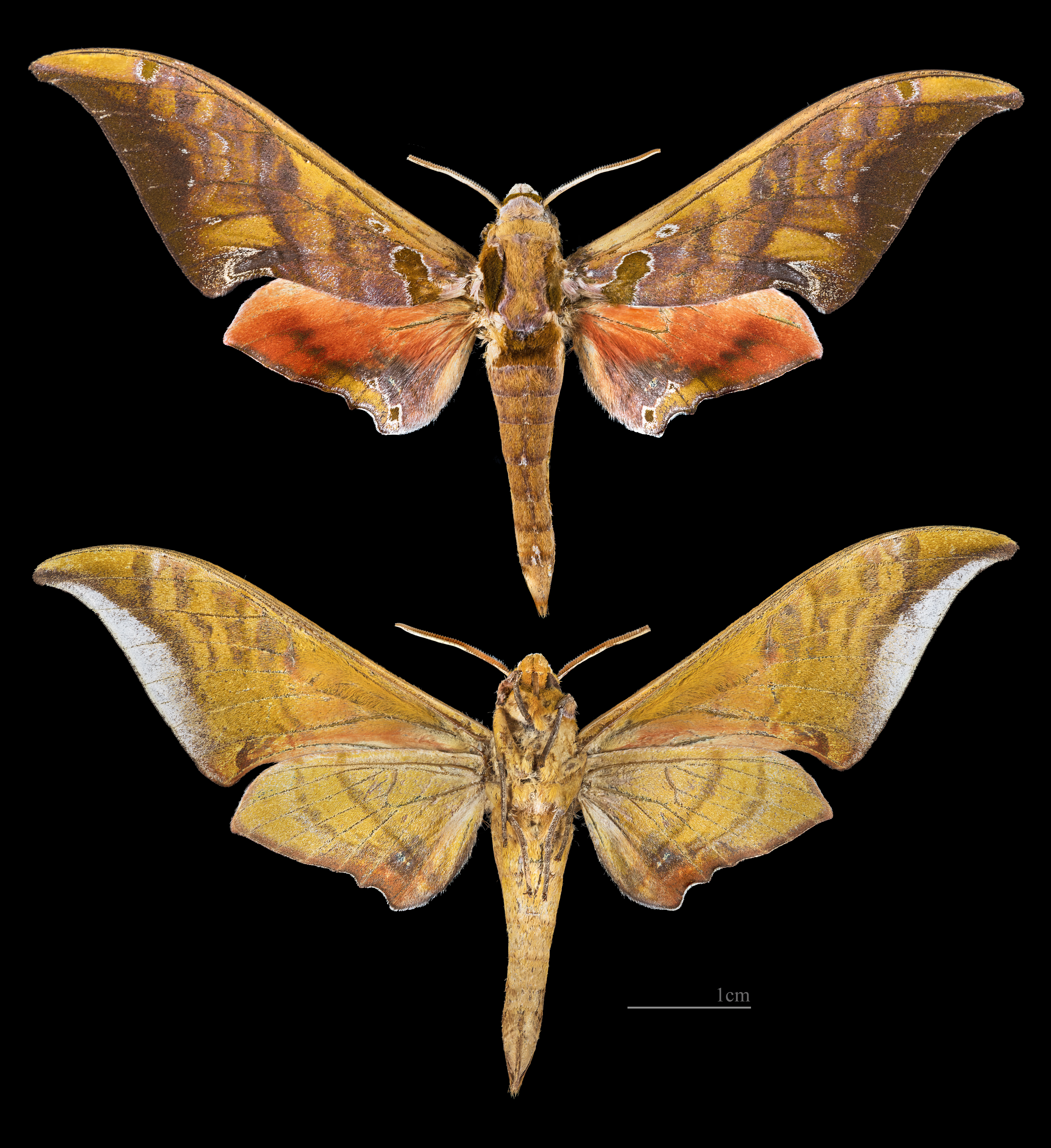
Orecta

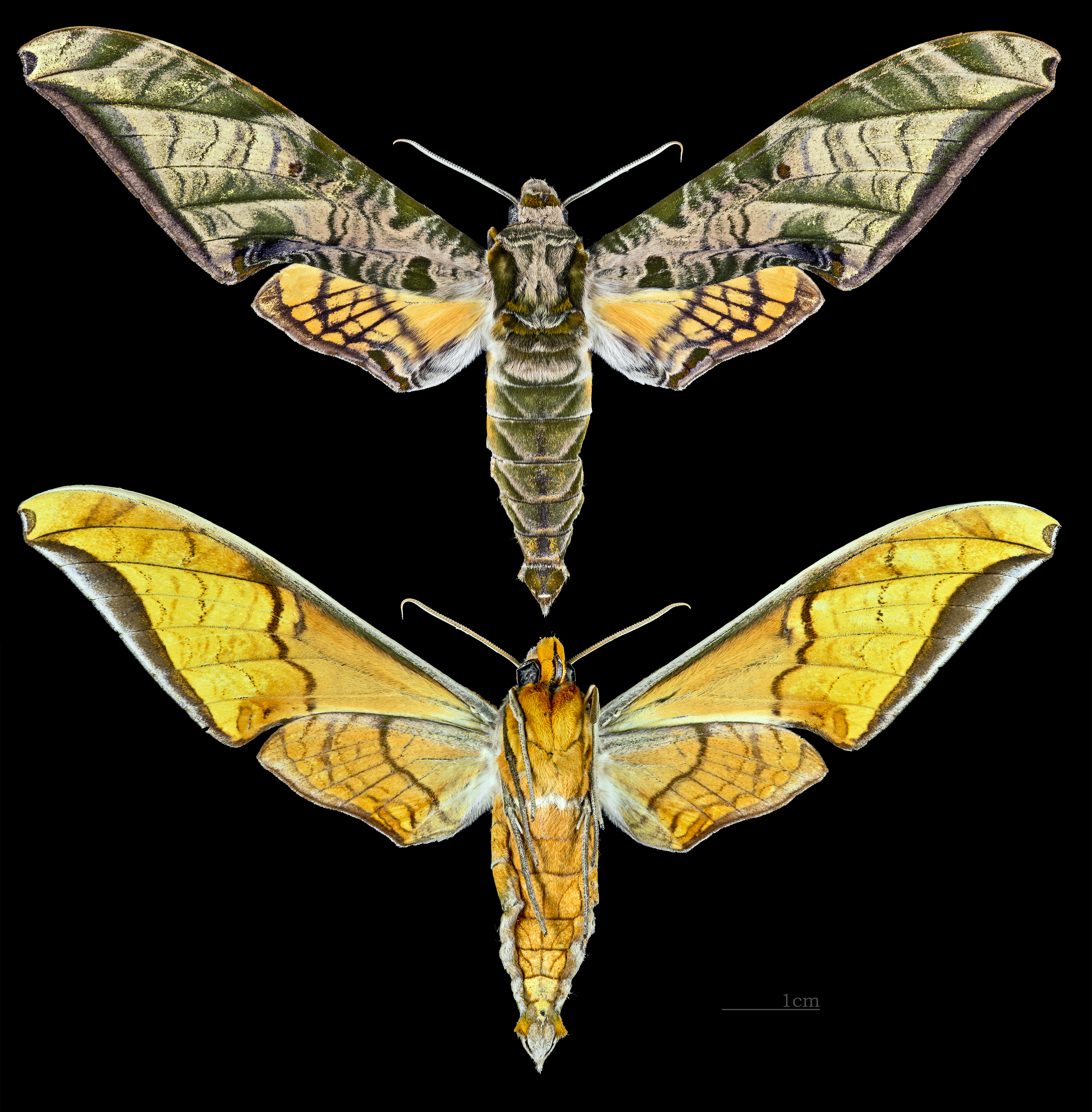
Protambulyx

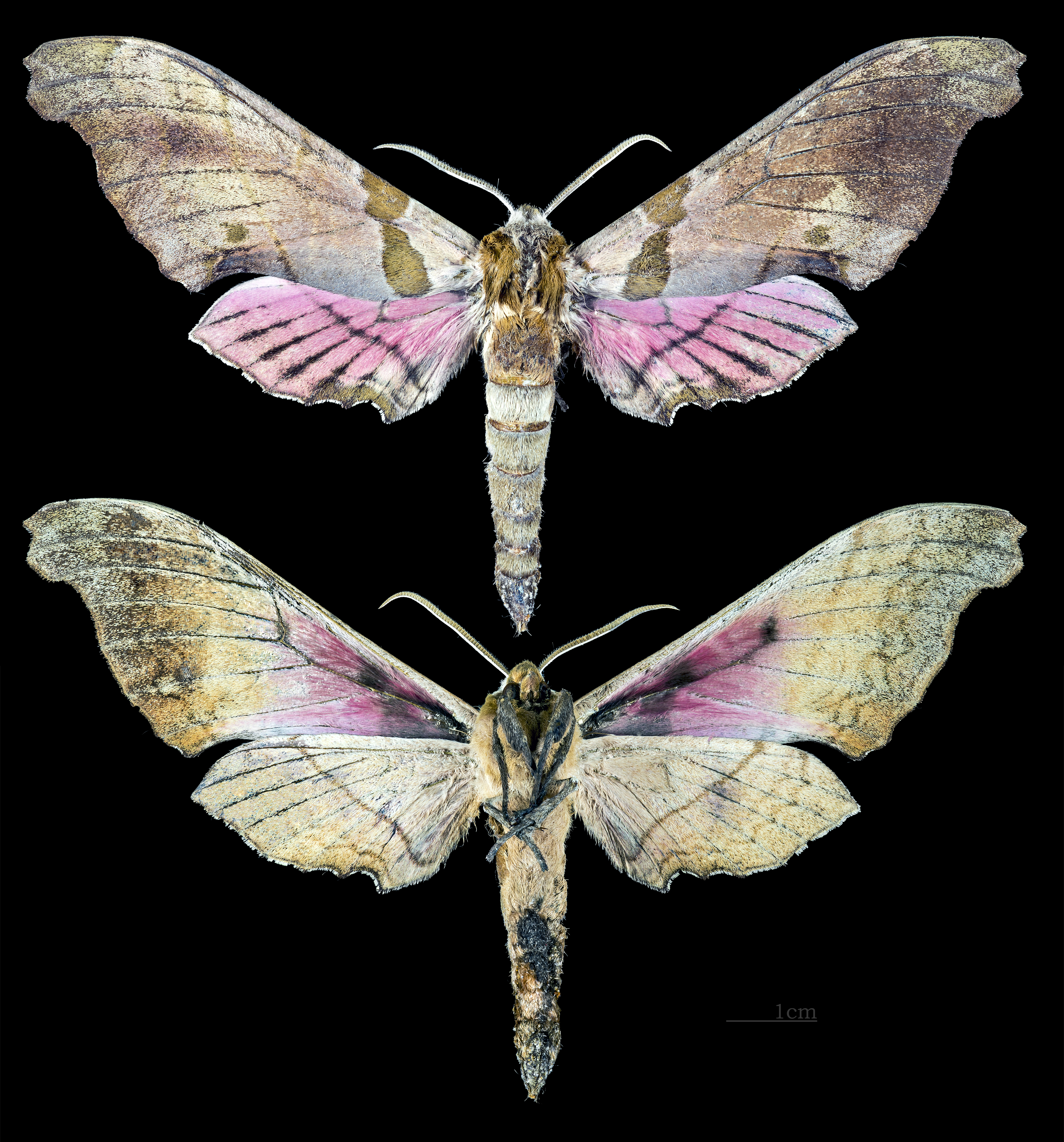
Trogolegnum
