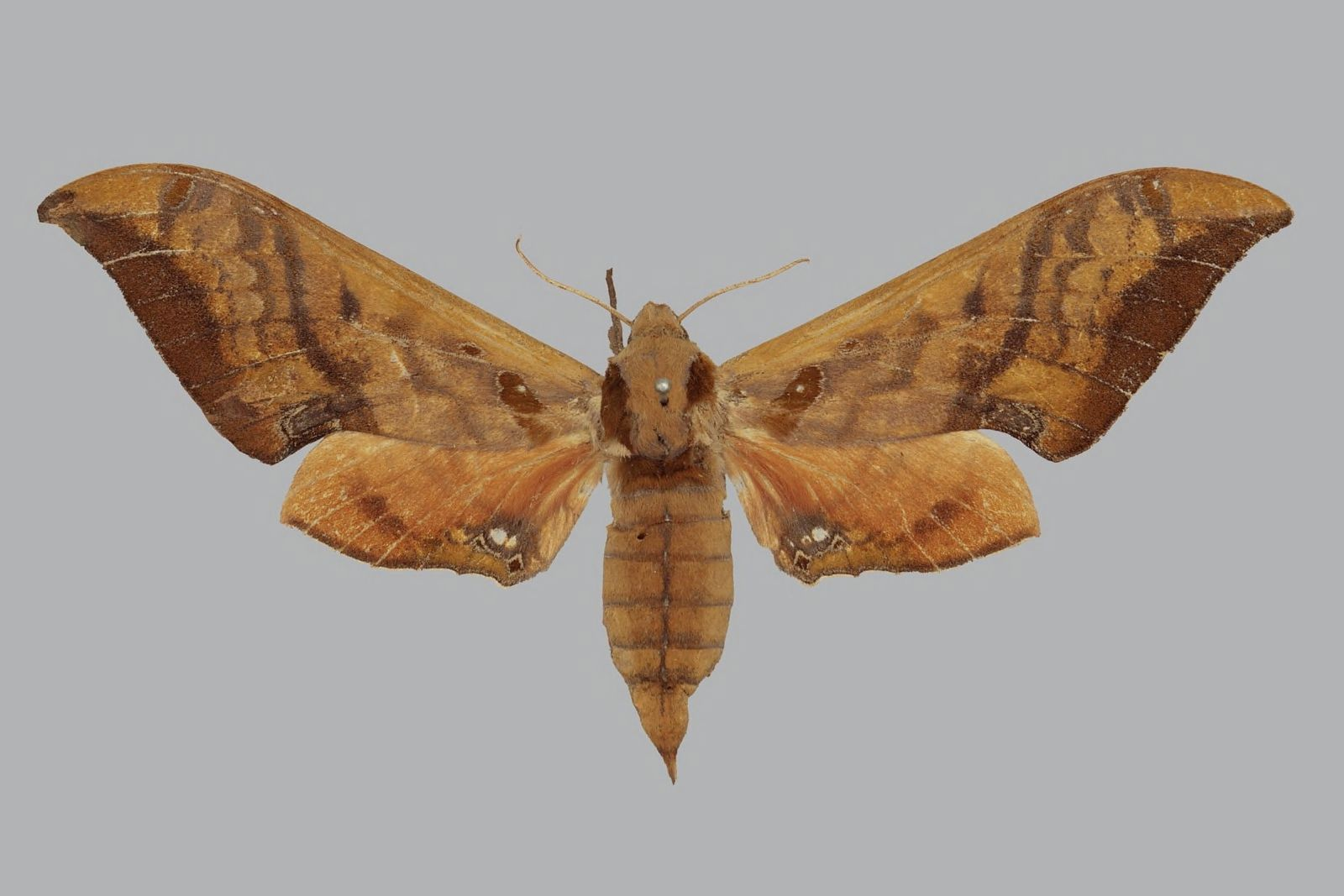

Scientific classification
- Domain: Eukaryota
- Kingdom: Animalia
- Phylum: Arthropoda
- Class: Insecta
- Order: Lepidoptera
- Family: Sphingidae
- Genus: Orecta
- Species: O. lycidas

Binomial name
- Orecta lycidas (Boisduval, 1875)

Synonyms
- Ambulyx lycidas Boisduval, 1875; Ambulyx tithonus Kirby, 1886; Philampelus lycidas eos Burmeister, 1878

= Orecta lycidas =

Species of moth

Orecta lycidas is a species of moth of the family Sphingidae. It is known from Argentina, Paraguay, Brazil and Bolivia.

Adults have been recorded in September.

The larvae have been recorded feeding on Laurus nobilis and Nectandra venulosa.

== Subspecies ==
- Orecta lycidas lycidas (Brazil)
- Orecta lycidas eos (Burmeister, 1878) (Argentina, Paraguay, Brazil and Bolivia)
