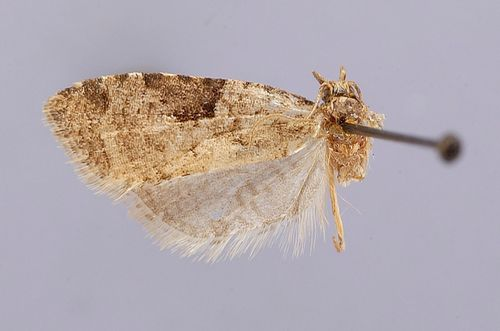

Scientific classification
- Kingdom: Animalia
- Phylum: Arthropoda
- Class: Insecta
- Order: Lepidoptera
- Family: Tortricidae
- Genus: Anopina
- Species: A. silvertonana

Binomial name
- Anopina silvertonana Obraztsov, 1962

= Anopina silvertonana =

Species of moth

Anopina silvertonana is a moth of the family Tortricidae first described by Obraztsov in 1962. It is found in the United States, including California, Arizona, New Mexico, Colorado and Wyoming.

The length of the forewings is 8–9.5 mm.
