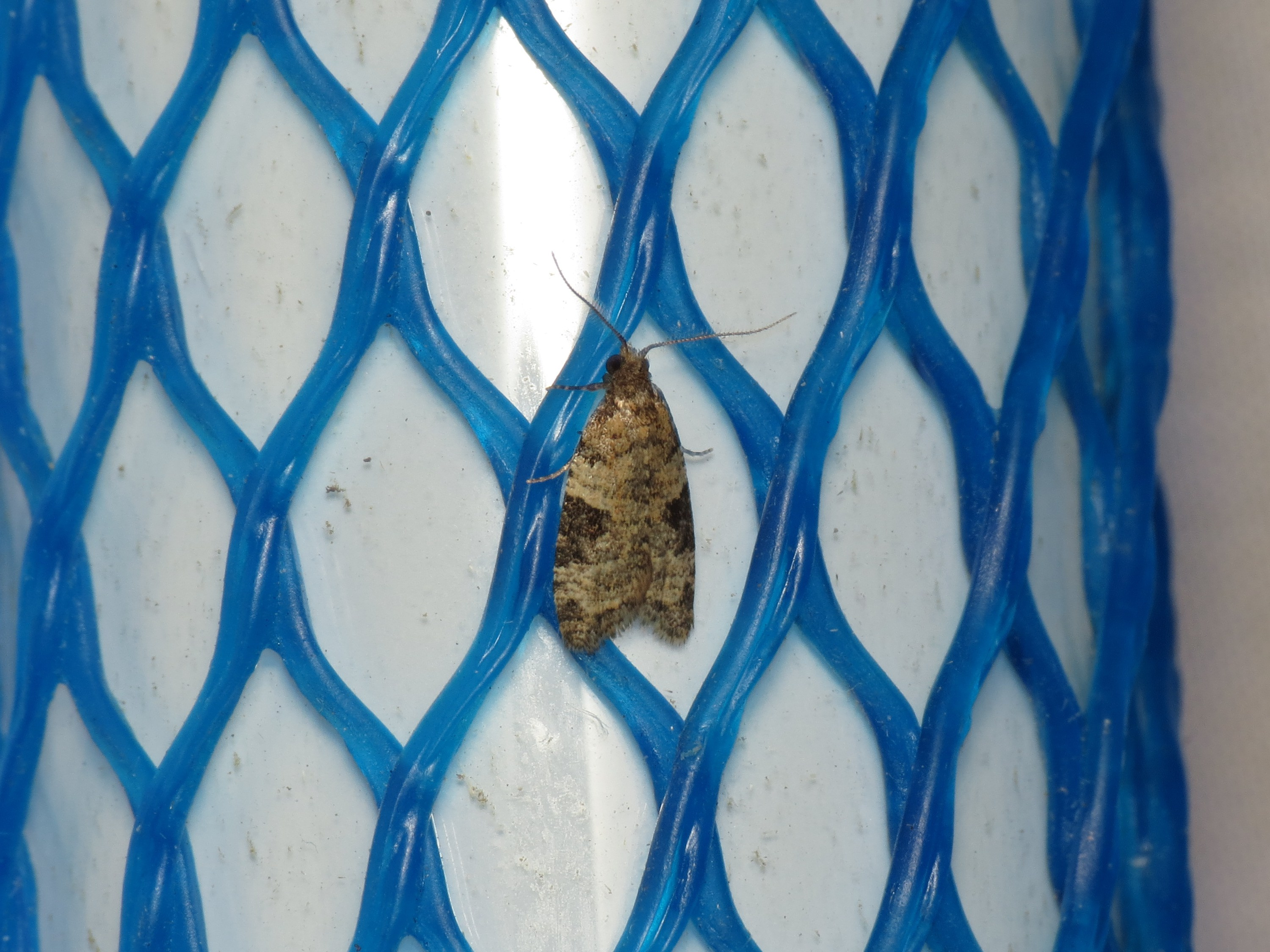
- Anopina triangulana

Scientific classification
- Domain: Eukaryota
- Kingdom: Animalia
- Phylum: Arthropoda
- Class: Insecta
- Order: Lepidoptera
- Family: Tortricidae
- Tribe: Euliini
- Genus: Anopina; Obraztsov, 1962

Synonyms
- Osmaria Razowski, 1991

= Anopina =

Genus of tortrix moths

Anopina is a genus of moths belonging to the subfamily Tortricinae of the family Tortricidae.

== Species ==
- Anopina ainslieana Obraztsov, 1962
- Anopina albomaculana Brown & Powell, 2000
- Anopina albominima Brown & Powell, 2000
- Anopina anotera (Walsingham, 1914)
- Anopina apicalis Brown & Powell, 2000
- Anopina arizonana (Walsingham, 1884)
- Anopina asaphes (Walsingham, 1914)
- Anopina asuturana Brown & Powell, 2000
- Anopina bicolor Brown & Powell, 2000
- Anopina bifurcatana Brown & Powell, 2000
- Anopina bloomfieldana Brown & Powell, 2000
- Anopina bonagotoides Brown & Powell, 2000
- Anopina chelatana Brown & Powell, 2000
- Anopina chemsaki Brown & Powell, 2000
- Anopina chipinquensis Brown & Powell, 2000
- Anopina chiricahuae Brown & Powell, 2000
- Anopina circumtila Brown & Powell, 2000
- Anopina condata Brown & Powell, 2000
- Anopina confusa Obraztsov, 1962
- Anopina dentata Brown & Powell, 2000
- Anopina desmatana (Walsingham, 1914)
- Anopina durangoensis Brown & Powell, 2000
- Anopina ednana (Kearfott, 1907)
- Anopina eleonora Obraztsov, 1962
- Anopina glossana Brown & Powell, 2000
- Anopina gnathodentana Brown & Powell, 2000
- Anopina griseana Brown & Powell, 2000
- Anopina guatemalana Brown & Powell, 2000
- Anopina guerrerana Obraztsov, 1962
- Anopina hermana Brown & Powell, 2000
- Anopina hilasma (Walsingham, 1914)
- Anopina impotana Brown & Powell, 2000
- Anopina incana (Walsingham, 1914)
- Anopina internacionana Brown & Powell, 2000
- Anopina iturbidensis Brown & Powell, 2000
- Anopina macartyana Brown & Powell, 2000
- Anopina macrospinana Brown & Powell, 2000
- Anopina manantlana Brown & Powell, 2000
- Anopina meredithi Brown & Powell, 2000
- Anopina metlec Brown & Powell, 2000
- Anopina minas Brown & Powell, 2000
- Anopina parasema (Walsingham, 1914)
- Anopina perplexa Brown & Powell, 2000
- Anopina phaeopina Brown & Powell, 2000
- Anopina pinana Brown & Powell, 2000
- Anopina potosiensis Brown & Powell, 2000
- Anopina praecisana (Walsingham, 1914)
- Anopina psaeroptera (Razowski & Becker, 1986)
- Anopina pseudominas Brown & Powell, 2000
- Anopina pseudotilia Brown & Powell, 2000
- Anopina quadritiliana Brown & Powell, 2000
- Anopina revolcaderos Brown & Powell, 2000
- Anopina rusiasana Brown & Powell, 2000
- Anopina sacculapinana Brown & Powell, 2000
- Anopina salvadorana Brown & Powell, 2000
- Anopina scintillans (Walsingham, 1914)
- Anopina silvertonana Obraztsov, 1962
- Anopina soltera Brown & Powell, 2000
- Anopina transtiliana Brown & Powell, 2000
- Anopina triangulana (Kearfott, 1908)
- Anopina undata (Walsingham, 1914)
- Anopina unicana Brown & Powell, 2000
- Anopina volcana Brown & Powell, 2000
- Anopina wellingi Brown & Powell, 2000
- Anopina wrighti Brown & Powell, 2000
- Anopina xicotepeca Razowski & Brown, 2004
- Anopina yecorana Brown & Powell, 2000
- Anopina yolox Brown & Powell, 2000

== See also ==
- List of Tortricidae genera
