= Anopina xicotepeca =

Scientific classification
- Domain: Eukaryota
- Kingdom: Animalia
- Phylum: Arthropoda
- Class: Insecta
- Order: Lepidoptera
- Family: Tortricidae
- Genus: Anopina
- Species: A. xicotepeca

Binomial name
- Anopina xicotepeca Razowski & Brown, 2004

Species of moth

Anopina xicotepeca is a species of moth of the family Tortricidae. It is found in Puebla, Mexico.

The length of the forewings is 7 mm.
