= Anopina ednana =

Scientific classification
- Domain: Eukaryota
- Kingdom: Animalia
- Phylum: Arthropoda
- Class: Insecta
- Order: Lepidoptera
- Family: Tortricidae
- Genus: Anopina
- Species: A. ednana

Binomial name
- Anopina ednana (Kearfott, 1907)

Synonyms
- Tortrix ednana Kearfott, 1907; Phalonia ednana; Cnephasia ednana

Species of moth

Anopina ednana is a moth of the family Tortricidae. It is found in eastern North America, including Maine, Massachusetts, New Hampshire, North Carolina, Ontario, Pennsylvania, Quebec, Tennessee and West Virginia.

The wingspan is 11–12 mm.

It was named in honour of the scientific illustrator Edna L. Beutenmüller.
