= Anopina psaeroptera =

Scientific classification
- Kingdom: Animalia
- Phylum: Arthropoda
- Clade: Pancrustacea
- Class: Insecta
- Order: Lepidoptera
- Family: Tortricidae
- Genus: Anopina
- Species: A. psaeroptera

Binomial name
- Anopina psaeroptera (Razowski & Becker, 1986)

Synonyms
- Phtheochroa psaeroptera Razowski & Becker, 1986; Osmaria psaeroptera

Species of moth

Anopina psaeroptera is a species of moth of the family Tortricidae. It is found in Veracruz, Mexico.
