= Anopina arizonana =

Scientific classification
- Domain: Eukaryota
- Kingdom: Animalia
- Phylum: Arthropoda
- Class: Insecta
- Order: Lepidoptera
- Family: Tortricidae
- Genus: Anopina
- Species: A. arizonana

Binomial name
- Anopina arizonana (Walsingham, 1884)

Synonyms
- Sciaphila arizonana Walsingham, 1884; Tortrix arizonana; Cnephasia arizonana

Species of moth

Anopina arizonana is a moth of the family Tortricidae first described by Lord Walsingham in 1884. It is found in North America from southern interior British Columbia and from Waterton Lakes, Alberta, south to Arizona.

The moth is about 16 mm.
