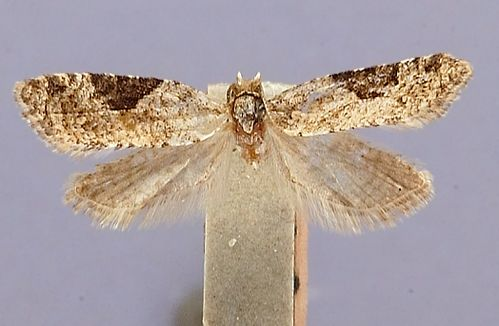

Scientific classification
- Kingdom: Animalia
- Phylum: Arthropoda
- Class: Insecta
- Order: Lepidoptera
- Family: Tortricidae
- Genus: Anopina
- Species: A. ainslieana

Binomial name
- Anopina ainslieana Obraztsov, 1962

= Anopina ainslieana =

Species of moth

Anopina ainslieana is a moth of the family Tortricidae. It is found in the southern United States in New Mexico and Colorado.

The length of the forewings is 5.5–7 mm.
