= Anopina incana =

Scientific classification
- Domain: Eukaryota
- Kingdom: Animalia
- Phylum: Arthropoda
- Class: Insecta
- Order: Lepidoptera
- Family: Tortricidae
- Genus: Anopina
- Species: A. incana

Binomial name
- Anopina incana (Walsingham, 1914)

Synonyms
- Tortrix incana Walsingham, 1914

Species of moth

Anopina incana is a moth of the family Tortricidae. It is found in Mexico in the state of Guerrero and Mexico City.
