= Anopina iturbidensis =

Scientific classification
- Kingdom: Animalia
- Phylum: Arthropoda
- Clade: Pancrustacea
- Class: Insecta
- Order: Lepidoptera
- Family: Tortricidae
- Genus: Anopina
- Species: A. iturbidensis

Binomial name
- Anopina iturbidensis Brown & Powell, 2000

Species of moth

Anopina iturbidensis is a species of moth of the family Tortricidae. It is found in Mexico, in the Sierra Madre Oriental from Nuevo Leon to Hidalgo and in the Sierra Madre Occidental from Durango to Jalisco.
