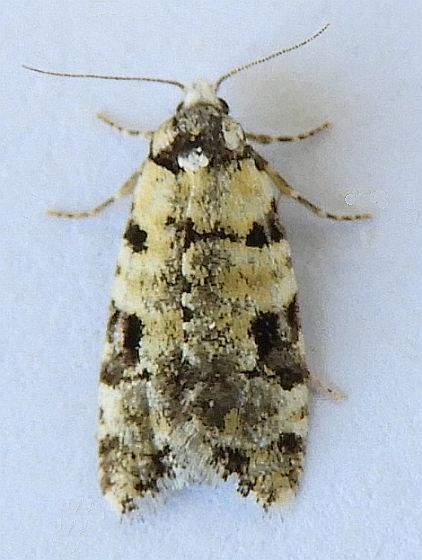

Scientific classification
- Kingdom: Animalia
- Phylum: Arthropoda
- Clade: Pancrustacea
- Class: Insecta
- Order: Lepidoptera
- Family: Tortricidae
- Genus: Anopina
- Species: A. hermana

Binomial name
- Anopina hermana Brown & Powell, 2000

= Anopina hermana =

Species of moth

Anopina hermana is a species of moth of the family Tortricidae. It is found in Chihuahua, Mexico and Arizona, United States.

The wingspan is 12–14 mm.
