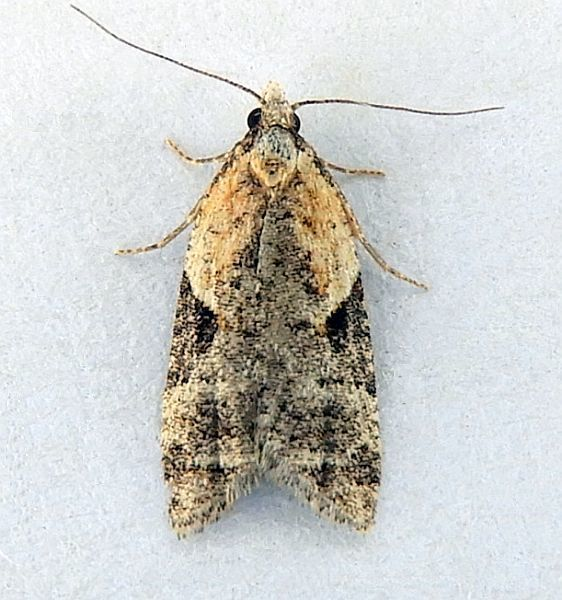

Scientific classification
- Kingdom: Animalia
- Phylum: Arthropoda
- Clade: Pancrustacea
- Class: Insecta
- Order: Lepidoptera
- Family: Tortricidae
- Genus: Anopina
- Species: A. eleonora

Binomial name
- Anopina eleonora Obraztsov, 1962

= Anopina eleonora =

Species of moth

Anopina eleonora is a moth of the family Tortricidae. It is found in the United States in Arizona, California, New Mexico and Texas.

The length of the forewings is 7–8 mm.
