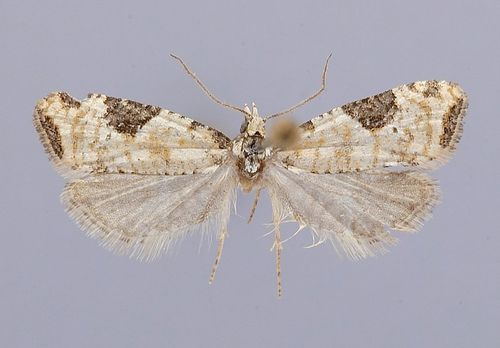

Scientific classification
- Kingdom: Animalia
- Phylum: Arthropoda
- Clade: Pancrustacea
- Class: Insecta
- Order: Lepidoptera
- Family: Tortricidae
- Genus: Anopina
- Species: A. wrighti

Binomial name
- Anopina wrighti Brown & Powell, 2000

= Anopina wrighti =

Species of moth

Anopina wrighti is a species of moth of the family Tortricidae. It is found in Colorado in the United States.

The wingspan is about 14 mm.
