= Anopina wellingi =

Scientific classification
- Kingdom: Animalia
- Phylum: Arthropoda
- Clade: Pancrustacea
- Class: Insecta
- Order: Lepidoptera
- Family: Tortricidae
- Genus: Anopina
- Species: A. wellingi

Binomial name
- Anopina wellingi Brown & Powell, 2000

Species of moth

Anopina wellingi is a species of moth of the family Tortricidae. It is found in Oaxaca, Mexico.
