= Anopina hilasma =

Scientific classification
- Domain: Eukaryota
- Kingdom: Animalia
- Phylum: Arthropoda
- Class: Insecta
- Order: Lepidoptera
- Family: Tortricidae
- Genus: Anopina
- Species: A. hilasma

Binomial name
- Anopina hilasma (Walsingham, 1914)

Synonyms
- Tortrix hilasma Walsingham, 1914

Species of moth

Anopina hilasma is a species of moth of the family Tortricidae. It is found in Guatemala.
