= Anopina internacionana =

Scientific classification
- Kingdom: Animalia
- Phylum: Arthropoda
- Clade: Pancrustacea
- Class: Insecta
- Order: Lepidoptera
- Family: Tortricidae
- Genus: Anopina
- Species: A. internacionana

Binomial name
- Anopina internacionana Brown & Powell, 2000

Species of moth

Anopina internacionana is a species of moth of the family Tortricidae. It is found in Durango, Mexico and Arizona and Colorado in the United States.

The wingspan is 13–15 mm.
