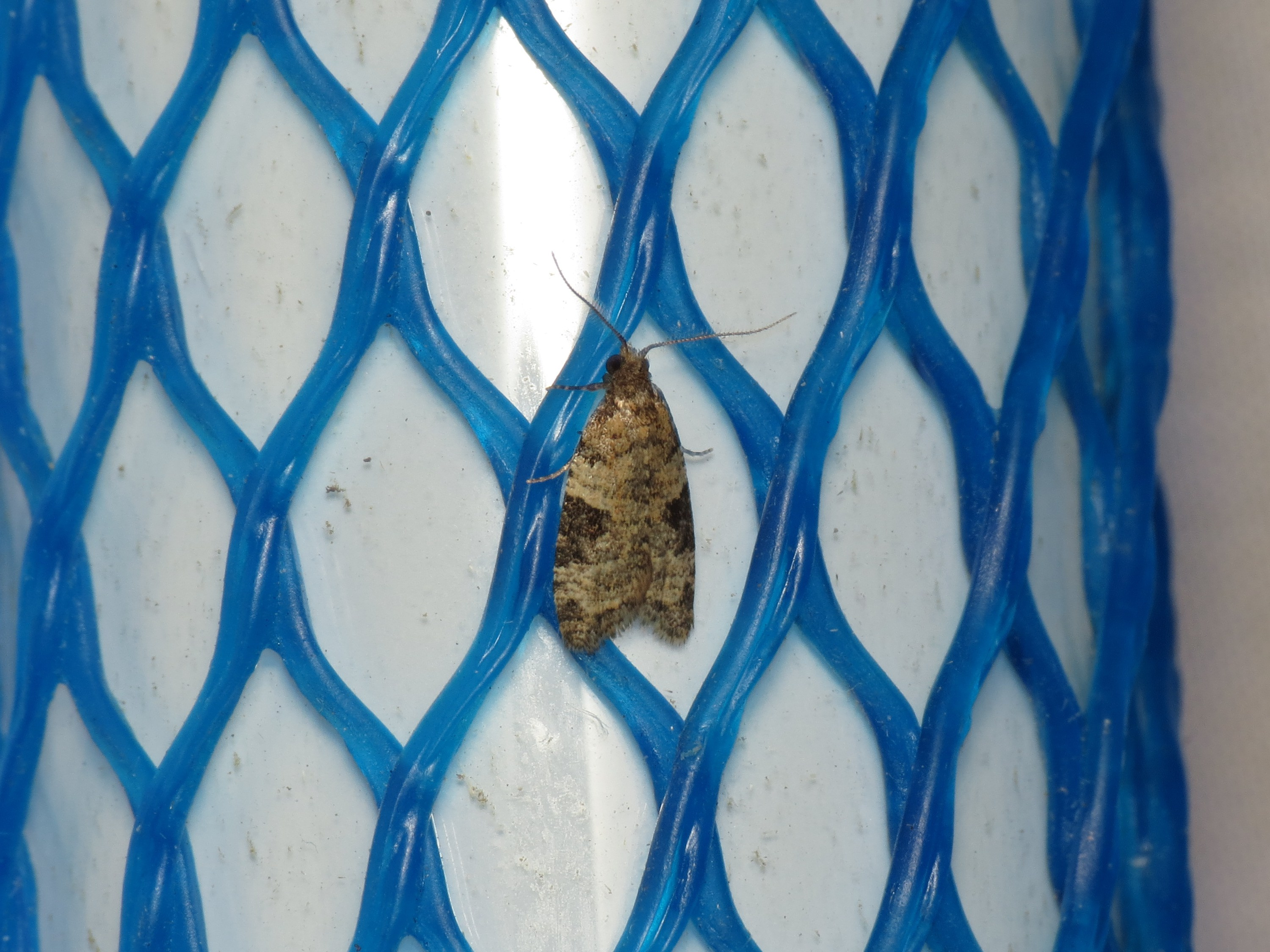

Scientific classification
- Domain: Eukaryota
- Kingdom: Animalia
- Phylum: Arthropoda
- Class: Insecta
- Order: Lepidoptera
- Family: Tortricidae
- Genus: Anopina
- Species: A. triangulana

Binomial name
- Anopina triangulana (Kearfott, 1908)

Synonyms
- Tortrix triangulana Kearfott, 1908

= Anopina triangulana =

Species of moth

Anopina triangulana is a moth of the family Tortricidae. It is found in California in the United States.

The length of the forewings is 6.5–8 mm. Adults are on wing from April to November.
