= Anopina anotera =

Scientific classification
- Domain: Eukaryota
- Kingdom: Animalia
- Phylum: Arthropoda
- Class: Insecta
- Order: Lepidoptera
- Family: Tortricidae
- Genus: Anopina
- Species: A. anotera

Binomial name
- Anopina anotera (Walsingham, 1914)

Synonyms
- Tortrix anotera Walsingham, 1914

Species of moth

Anopina anotera is a moth of the family Tortricidae. It is found in Guatemala.
