= Anopina guerrerana =

Scientific classification
- Domain: Eukaryota
- Kingdom: Animalia
- Phylum: Arthropoda
- Class: Insecta
- Order: Lepidoptera
- Family: Tortricidae
- Genus: Anopina
- Species: A. guerrerana

Binomial name
- Anopina guerrerana Obraztsov, 1962

Species of moth

Anopina guerrerana is a moth of the family Tortricidae. It is found in Guerrero, Mexico.

The length of the forewings is about 7 mm.
