= List of moths of China =

This is a list of moths of China, other than those in the family Sesiidae), which are given in List of moths of China (Sesiidae).

== Lyonetiidae ==
- Lyonetia clerkella (Linnaeus, 1758) (Xizang)
- Lyonetia ledi Wocke, 1859
- Lyonetia prunifoliella (Hübner, 1796)
- Lyonetiola blasta T. Liu
- Lyonetiola duplistriata T. Liu

== Other families ==
- Abaciscus costimacula
- Abraxas celidota
- Abraxas sinopicaria
- Abraxas suspecta
- Absala
- Acantholipes curvilinea
- Acanthophila angustiptera
- Acanthophila bimaculata
- Acanthophila liui
- Acanthophila nyingchiensis
- Acanthophila obscura
- Acanthophila qinlingensis
- Acerbia khumbeli
- Acerbia kolpakofskii
- Acleris albopterana
- Acleris dispar
- Acleris dryochyta
- Acleris duracina
- Acleris extranea
- Acleris ferox
- Acleris ferrugana
- Acleris flavopterana
- Acleris fuscopterana
- Acleris fuscopunctata
- Acleris gibbopterana
- Acleris griseopterana
- Acleris helvolaris
- Acleris imitatrix
- Acleris kuznetzovi
- Acleris lucipeta
- Acleris lutescentis
- Acleris macropterana
- Acleris maculopterana
- Acleris micropterana
- Acleris nigropterana
- Acleris ochropicta
- Acleris ochropterana
- Acleris porphyrocentra
- Acleris quadridentana
- Acleris recula
- Acleris rosella
- Acleris sinica
- Acleris sinuopterana
- Acleris sinuosaria
- Acleris stachi
- Acleris tabida
- Acleris thiana
- Acleris zeta
- Acria cocophaga
- Acrobasis cantonella
- Acrobasis encaustella
- Acrobasis ferruginella
- Acrobasis frankella
- Acrobasis injunctella
- Acrobasis lienpingialis
- Acrobasis mienshani
- Acrobasis obrutella
- Acrocercops amurensis
- Acronicta metaxantha
- Acronicta nigricans
- Acronicta psichinesis
- Acronicta tiena
- Actias arianeae
- Actias chrisbrechlinae
- Actias dubernardi
- Actias kongjiaria
- Actias uljanae
- Actias winbrechlini
- Adoxophyes beijingensis
- Adoxophyes congruana
- Adoxophyes cyrtosema
- Aemene maculifascia
- Aemene punctatissima
- Aemene punctigera
- Aethes acerba
- Aethes atmospila
- Aethes bistigmatus
- Aethes citreoflava
- Aethes delotypa
- Aethes furvescens
- Aethes hoenei
- Aethes mesomelana
- Aethes rectilineana
- Aethes rubigana
- Aethes semicircularis
- Aethes subcitreoflava
- Agassiziella kwangtungiale
- Aglaops youboialis
- Aglossa micalialis
- Agnibesa pictaria
- Agnibesa plumbeolineata
- Agnibesa punctilinearia
- Agnidra argypha
- Agnidra ataxia
- Agnidra corticata
- Agnidra fulvior
- Agnidra furva
- Agnidra hoenei
- Agnidra tanyospinosa
- Agnidra tigrina
- Agnippe dichotoma
- Agnippe echinulata
- Agnippe miniscula
- Agnippe novisyrictis
- Agnippe yongdengensis
- Agnippe zhouzhiensis
- Agonopterix acutivalvula
- Agonopterix deltopa
- Agonopterix dilatata
- Agonopterix epichersa
- Agonopterix hoenei
- Agonopterix likiangella
- Agonopterix monotona
- Agonopterix orientalis
- Agonopterix rhodogastra
- Agonopterix ventrangulata
- Agonopterix xylinopis
- Agrisius aestivalis
- Agrisius albida
- Agrisius fuliginosus
- Agrisius similis
- Agrisius vernalis
- Agrotera lienpingialis
- Agylla sinensis
- Agylla vittata
- Ahamus altaicola
- Ahamus anomopterus
- Ahamus gangcaensis
- Ahamus jianchuanensis
- Ahamus lijiangensis
- Ahamus luquensis
- Ahamus maquensis
- Ahamus menyuanicus
- Ahamus sichuanus
- Ahamus yulongensis
- Ahamus yunlongensis
- Ahamus yunnanensis
- Ahamus yushuensis
- Ahamus zadoiensis
- Ahamus zhayuensis
- Allotalanta deceptrix
- Aloa collaris
- Alphaea anopunctata
- Alphaea chiyo
- Alphaea dellabrunai
- Alphaea hongfena
- Alphaea khasiana
- Alphaea turatii
- Alucita baihua
- Alucita beinongdai
- Alucita hypocosma
- Alucita longipalpella
- Alucita philomela
- Amata perixanthia
- Amata polymita
- Ambia naumanni
- Ambulyx adhemariusa
- Ambulyx amara
- Ambulyx interplacida
- Ambulyx pseudoregia
- Ambulyx regia
- Ambulyx schauffelbergeri
- Ambulyx zhejiangensis
- Ammatucha brevilepigera
- Ammatucha flavipalpa
- Ammatucha longilepigera
- Ampelophaga nikolae
- Amphicoecia phasmatica
- Amphipyra alpherakii
- Amphitorna brunhyala
- Amphitorna olga
- Amphitorna purpureofascia
- Amsactoides guangxica
- Amurrhyparia
- Anacampsis anisogramma
- Anameristes doryphora
- Anania albeoverbascalis
- Anania chekiangensis
- Anania cuspidata
- Anania delicatalis
- Anania flavidecoralis
- Anania flavimacularis
- Anania fuscobrunnealis
- Anania luteorubralis
- Anania occidentalis
- Anania solaris
- Anania subfumalis
- Anania teneralis
- Anania vicinalis
- Anarsia beitunica
- Anarsia decora
- Anarsia euphorodes
- Anarsia eximia
- Anarsia isogona
- Anarsia largimacularis
- Anarsia magnibimaculata
- Anarsia novitricornis
- Anarsia squamerecta
- Anatrachyntis ptilodelta
- Anatrachyntis yunnanea
- Ancylolomia aduncella
- Ancylolomia carcinella
- Ancylolomia hamatella
- Ancylolomia likiangella
- Ancylolomia longicorniella
- Ancylolomia rotaxella
- Ancylolomia umbonella
- Ancylosis euclastella
- Ancylosis griseomixtella
- Anerosoma
- Antheraea pernyi
- Antheraea roylei
- Antichlidas trigonia
- Antispila kunyuensis
- Anydrelia plicataria
- Aphelia albidula
- Aphelia cinerarialis
- Aphelia disjuncta
- Aphelia flexiloqua
- Aphelia fuscialis
- Aphelia paleana
- Aphomia lolotialis
- Aphomia melli
- Aphomia pygmealis
- Apogurea
- Aprepodoxa mimocharis
- Aproaerema brevihamata
- Aproaerema longihamata
- Archips arcanus
- Archips compitalis
- Archips crassifolianus
- Archips elongatus
- Archips enodis
- Archips eximius
- Archips kellerianus
- Archips limatus
- Archips menotoma
- Archips opiparus
- Archips pachyvalvus
- Archips rudy
- Archips semistructus
- Archips spinatus
- Archips strigopterus
- Archips strojny
- Archips tharsaleopus
- Archischoenobius minumus
- Archischoenobius nanlingensis
- Archischoenobius nigrolepis
- Archischoenobius pallidalis
- Areas galactina
- Argyarctia sericeipennis
- Arichanna sinica
- Aristebulea principis
- Aroga controvalva
- Aroga danfengensis
- Asclerobia sinensis
- Ashibusa aculeata
- Ashibusa clavativalvula
- Ashibusa flavalba
- Ashibusa lativalvula
- Ashibusa sinensis
- Ashibusa subelliptica
- Asiapistosia stigma
- Asiapistosia subnigra
- Asota canaraica
- Asota heliconia
- Assara exiguella
- Assara hoeneella
- Assara incredibilis
- Assara linjiangensis
- Assara tumidula
- Asthena albidaria
- Asthena plenaria
- Asura carnea
- Asura diluta
- Asura griseata
- Asura irregularis
- Asura likiangensis
- Asura megala
- Asura modesta
- Asura nigrivena
- Asura unipuncta
- Asuridoides atuntseica
- Asuridoides osthelderi
- Athrips bidilatata
- Athrips gansuensis
- Athrips huangshana
- Athrips montana
- Athrips neimongolica
- Athrips nigristriata
- Athrips ravida
- Athrips septempunctata
- Athrips tsaidamica
- Athrypsiastis salva
- Athymoris martialis
- Athymoris paramecola
- Athymoris phreatosa
- Aurorobotys aurorina
- Aurorobotys crassispinalis
- Austrapoda beijingensis
- Austrapoda seres
- Autosticha arcivalvaris
- Autosticha bacilliformis
- Autosticha bilobella
- Autosticha chishuiensis
- Autosticha cipingensis
- Autosticha complexivalvula
- Autosticha conjugipunctata
- Autosticha cuspidata
- Autosticha dayuensis
- Autosticha dimochla
- Autosticha fallaciosa
- Autosticha flavida
- Autosticha guangdongensis
- Autosticha guttulata
- Autosticha hainanica
- Autosticha heteromalla
- Autosticha latiuncusa
- Autosticha leukosa
- Autosticha lushanensis
- Autosticha maculosa
- Autosticha menglunica
- Autosticha microphilodema
- Autosticha mirabilis
- Autosticha nanchangensis
- Autosticha oxyacantha
- Autosticha pentagona
- Autosticha rectipunctata
- Autosticha shenae
- Autosticha shexianica
- Autosticha sichunica
- Autosticha sinica
- Autosticha squarrosa
- Autosticha tetragonopa
- Autosticha tianmushana
- Autosticha triangulimaculella
- Autosticha valvidentata
- Autosticha valvifida
- Autosticha wufengensis
- Auzata amaryssa
- Auzata chinensis
- Auzata minuta
- Auzata plana
- Auzata semilucida
- Bellulia hanae
- Betapsestis brevis
- Biston marginata
- Bombyx mori
- Brachmia elaeophanes
- Brachmia monotona
- Brachmia obtrectata
- Brachmia philodema
- Brachmia quassata
- Brachmia tepidata
- Brachodes gressitti
- Brahmaea certhia
- Brahmaea wallichii
- Bryotropha brevivalvata
- Bryotropha elegantula
- Bryotropha montana
- Bryotropha palliptera
- Calamotropha melli
- Caligula anna
- Caligula japonica
- Caligula jonasi
- Caligula lindia
- Calleremites
- Callidrepana jianfenglingensis
- Callindra equitalis
- Callindra principalis
- Calliteara lunulata
- Callopistria nigrescens
- Caloptilia aeolospila
- Caloptilia bimaculata
- Caloptilia dactylifera
- Caloptilia dentata
- Caloptilia garcinicola
- Caloptilia gladiatrix
- Caloptilia hamulifera
- Caloptilia hypodroma
- Caloptilia jasminicola
- Caloptilia koelreutericola
- Caloptilia pekinensis
- Caloptilia quadripunctata
- Caloptilia saccisquamata
- Caloptilia sassafrasicola
- Caloptilia sichuanensis
- Caloptilia soyella
- Caloptilia spinulosa
- Caloptilia striata
- Caloptilia striolata
- Caloptilia tricolor
- Caloptilia trimaculiformis
- Calpenia saundersi
- Camptoloma bella
- Camptoloma kishidai
- Caradjaria
- Catephia albomacula
- Catephia molybdocrosis
- Catephia stygia
- Catocala aestimabilis
- Catocala borthi
- Catocala butleri
- Catocala chenyixini
- Catocala contemnenda
- Catocala davidi
- Catocala dejeani
- Catocala ellamajor
- Catocala florianii
- Catocala gansan
- Catocala haitzi
- Catocala hoenei
- Catocala hoferi
- Catocala hymenoides
- Catocala infasciata
- Catocala invasa
- Catocala jansseni
- Catocala jouga
- Catocala juncta
- Catocala jyoka
- Catocala kaki
- Catocala kasenko
- Catocala kuangtungensis
- Catocala largeteaui
- Catocala lehmanni
- Catocala longipalpis
- Catocala maculata
- Catocala martyrum
- Catocala maso
- Catocala naumanni
- Catocala ohshimai
- Catocala optima
- Catocala seibaldi
- Catocala seiohbo
- Catocala sinyaevi
- Catocala svetlana
- Catocala szechuena
- Catocala thomsoni
- Catocala triphaenoides
- Catocala uljanae
- Catocala xizangensis
- Catoptria mienshani
- Catoptria pandora
- Catoptria persephone
- Catoptria thibetica
- Catoptria xerxes
- Cerura menciana
- Chinese Tussah Moth
- Choristoneura metasequoiacola
- Chrysoteuchia curvicavus
- Chrysoteuchia deltella
- Chrysoteuchia dentatella
- Chrysoteuchia disasterella
- Chrysoteuchia fractellus
- Chrysoteuchia fuliginosellus
- Chrysoteuchia funebrellus
- Chrysoteuchia furva
- Chrysoteuchia hamatella
- Chrysoteuchia hamatoides
- Chrysoteuchia hyalodiscella
- Chrysoteuchia lolotiella
- Chrysoteuchia ningensis
- Chrysoteuchia nonifasciaria
- Chrysoteuchia picturatellus
- Chrysoteuchia quadrapicula
- Chrysoteuchia rotundiprojecta
- Chrysoteuchia shafferi
- Chrysoteuchia yuennanellus
- Cirrhochrista spinuella
- Cochylidia contumescens
- Cochylidia liui
- Cochylimorpha alticolana
- Cochylimorpha amabilis
- Cochylimorpha bipunctata
- Cochylimorpha conankinensis
- Cochylimorpha cuspidata
- Cochylimorpha fuscimacula
- Cochylimorpha isocornutana
- Cochylimorpha jaculana
- Cochylimorpha lungtangensis
- Cochylimorpha maleropa
- Cochylimorpha nankinensis
- Cochylimorpha nipponana
- Cochylimorpha perturbatana
- Cochylimorpha razowskiana
- Cochylimorpha simplicis
- Cochylimorpha yangtseana
- Cochylis posterana
- Cochylis roseana
- Coleophora adspersella
- Coleophora algidella
- Coleophora alticorollina
- Coleophora apicidentata
- Coleophora buteella
- Coleophora capitargentella
- Coleophora caradjai
- Coleophora carchara
- Coleophora cuprea
- Coleophora curvidentatella
- Coleophora dangchuanica
- Coleophora directella
- Coleophora dorsiproducta
- Coleophora estriatella
- Coleophora eucalla
- Coleophora falcipenella
- Coleophora fengxianica
- Coleophora gongliuensis
- Coleophora harbinensis
- Coleophora heihensis
- Coleophora jaculatoria
- Coleophora lativalva
- Coleophora longispina
- Coleophora lucida
- Coleophora melanograpta
- Coleophora montana
- Coleophora neobagorella
- Coleophora neolycii
- Coleophora ningxiana
- Coleophora novisqualorella
- Coleophora nyingchiensis
- Coleophora ochroptera
- Coleophora onobrychiella
- Coleophora orientalis
- Coleophora ossaedeaga
- Coleophora pallidiptera
- Coleophora pandionella
- Coleophora paradoxella
- Coleophora parenthella
- Coleophora parilis
- Coleophora pendulivalvula
- Coleophora plicipunctella
- Coleophora plurispinella
- Coleophora quadrifurca
- Coleophora resupina
- Coleophora sinensis
- Coleophora sittella
- Coleophora summivola
- Coleophora symmicta
- Coleophora varisequens
- Coleophora weymarni
- Coleophora xinjiangensis
- Coleophora yunnanica
- Coleophora yuzhongensis
- Compsoctena pinguis
- Concubina
- Cossus hoenei
- Cossus siniaevi
- Cotachena pubescens
- Crambus achilles
- Crambus bipartellus
- Crambus isshiki
- Crambus magnificus
- Crambus narcissus
- Crambus nigriscriptellus
- Crambus sinicolellus
- Creatonotos fasciatus (Hong Kong only)
- Creatonotos gangis
- Creatonotos transiens
- Cyclophora mesotoma
- Deltoplastis commatopa
- Deltoplastis lobigera
- Deltoplastis prionaspis
- Diamondback moth
- Dichagyris juldussi
- Dioryctria resiniphila
- Ditrigona aphya
- Ditrigona artema
- Ditrigona berres
- Ditrigona candida
- Ditrigona chama
- Ditrigona chionea
- Ditrigona cirruncata
- Ditrigona inconspicua
- Ditrigona innotata
- Ditrigona lineata
- Ditrigona margarita
- Ditrigona pentesticha
- Ditrigona platytes
- Ditrigona policharia
- Ditrigona polyobotaria
- Ditrigona pomenaria
- Ditrigona sciara
- Ditrigona spilota
- Ditrigona titana
- Doloploca supina
- Drasteria scolopax
- Eboda dissimilis
- Ectomyelois bipectinalis
- Ectomyelois furvivena
- Elophila nigrolinealis
- Elophila nuda
- Elophila radiospinula
- Elophila roesleri
- Elusa inventa
- Endoclita sinensis
- Eois amydroscia
- Epermenia dalianicola
- Epermenia sinica
- Epicephala angustisaccula
- Epicephala domina
- Epicephala impolliniferens
- Epicephala lanceolaria
- Epicrocis oegnusalis
- Epinotia brunnichana
- Epinotia solandriana
- Eschata quadrispinea
- Euchromius nivalis
- Eudocima phalonia
- Eupithecia abrepta
- Eupithecia acerba
- Eupithecia actrix
- Eupithecia admiranda
- Eupithecia adoranda
- Eupithecia aenigma
- Eupithecia albimedia
- Eupithecia amandae
- Eupithecia amicula
- Eupithecia andrasi
- Eupithecia anteacta
- Eupithecia antiqua
- Eupithecia apta
- Eupithecia arenosa
- Eupithecia argentea
- Eupithecia atrisignis
- Eupithecia atuni
- Eupithecia avara
- Eupithecia benigna
- Eupithecia blenna
- Eupithecia boneta
- Eupithecia brevifasciaria
- Eupithecia burselongata
- Eupithecia buysseata
- Eupithecia caduca
- Eupithecia camilla
- Eupithecia certa
- Eupithecia cervina
- Eupithecia chesiata
- Eupithecia chingana
- Eupithecia cichisa
- Eupithecia citraria
- Eupithecia coniurata
- Eupithecia cordata
- Eupithecia coribalteata
- Eupithecia cotidiana
- Eupithecia deformis
- Eupithecia delicata
- Eupithecia depressa
- Eupithecia divina
- Eupithecia duplex
- Eupithecia dura
- Eupithecia egena
- Eupithecia ensifera
- Eupithecia epileptica
- Eupithecia eszterkae
- Eupithecia eurytera
- Eupithecia exacerbata
- Eupithecia eximia
- Eupithecia exquisita
- Eupithecia extrinseca
- Eupithecia fatigata
- Eupithecia fenita
- Eupithecia fervida
- Eupithecia ficta
- Eupithecia finitima
- Eupithecia formosa
- Eupithecia fortis
- Eupithecia fragmentaria
- Eupithecia fulvidorsata
- Eupithecia granata
- Eupithecia hebes
- Eupithecia hesperina
- Eupithecia hoenehermanni
- Eupithecia hoenei
- Eupithecia honesta
- Eupithecia hongxiangae
- Eupithecia horrida
- Eupithecia impolita
- Eupithecia importuna
- Eupithecia incohata
- Eupithecia incorrupta
- Eupithecia indecora
- Eupithecia indissolubilis
- Eupithecia inexhausta
- Eupithecia infecta
- Eupithecia infensa
- Eupithecia infortunata
- Eupithecia inopinata
- Eupithecia insana
- Eupithecia insolita
- Eupithecia intolerabilis
- Eupithecia irreperta
- Eupithecia julia
- Eupithecia konradi
- Eupithecia lamata
- Eupithecia larentimima
- Eupithecia lasciva
- Eupithecia laudabilis
- Eupithecia laudenda
- Eupithecia levata
- Eupithecia likiangi
- Eupithecia lilliputata
- Eupithecia luctuosa
- Eupithecia lunatica
- Eupithecia manifesta
- Eupithecia matrona
- Eupithecia mediocincta
- Eupithecia mentita
- Eupithecia minutula
- Eupithecia missionerata
- Eupithecia molestissima
- Eupithecia molybdaena
- Eupithecia mortua
- Eupithecia nigristriata
- Eupithecia nirvana
- Eupithecia nodosa
- Eupithecia nonferenda
- Eupithecia nonpurgata
- Eupithecia noxia
- Eupithecia omissa
- Eupithecia omniparens
- Eupithecia opicata
- Eupithecia orba
- Eupithecia paupera
- Eupithecia pekingiana
- Eupithecia perendina
- Eupithecia perpetua
- Eupithecia placida
- Eupithecia pollens
- Eupithecia praecipitata
- Eupithecia primitiva
- Eupithecia puella
- Eupithecia qinlingata
- Eupithecia refertissima
- Eupithecia russula
- Eupithecia sacrimontis
- Eupithecia sacrivicae
- Eupithecia sacrosancta
- Eupithecia salubris
- Eupithecia sclerata
- Eupithecia semicalva
- Eupithecia seminuda
- Eupithecia sempiterna
- Eupithecia serpentigena
- Eupithecia severa
- Eupithecia spissata
- Eupithecia stomachosa
- Eupithecia studiosa
- Eupithecia subbrunneata
- Eupithecia subexiguata
- Eupithecia subita
- Eupithecia sublasciva
- Eupithecia subplacida
- Eupithecia svetlanae
- Eupithecia szelenyica
- Eupithecia tamara
- Eupithecia tectaria
- Eupithecia tempestuosa
- Eupithecia tepida
- Eupithecia testacea
- Eupithecia tibetana
- Eupithecia turpis
- Eupithecia ultrix
- Eupithecia vana
- Eupithecia vasta
- Eupithecia verecunda
- Eupithecia verprota
- Eupithecia viata
- Eupithecia villica
- Eupithecia wangi
- Eupithecia yunnani
- Euzophera albipunctella
- Euzophera alpherakyella
- Euzophera atuntsealis
- Euzophera batangensis
- Euzophera cornutella
- Euzophera mienshani
- Evergestis albifasciaria
- Evergestis holophaealis
- Exaeretia bignatha
- Exaeretia concaviuscula
- Exaeretia crassispina
- Exaeretia deltata
- Exaeretia exornata
- Exaeretia liupanshana
- Exaeretia longifolia
- Exaeretia magnignatha
- Exaeretia qinghaiana
- Fascellina chromataria
- Frisilia chinensis
- Ganisa plana
- Gargela albidusa
- Gargela bilineata
- Gargela distigma
- Gargela furca
- Gargela fuscusa
- Gargela hainana
- Gargela hastatela
- Gargela quadrispinula
- Gargela xizangensis
- Gibbovalva clavata
- Gillmeria macrornis
- Glyphipterix amseli
- Glyphipterix chionosoma
- Glyphipterix deliciosa
- Glyphipterix dolichophyes
- Glyphipterix dolichophyses
- Glyphipterix erebanassa
- Glyphipterix macrodrachma
- Glyphipterix octatoma
- Glyphipterix rhinoceropa
- Glyphipterix semiflavana
- Glyphodes pulverulentalis
- Gnorismoneura serrata
- Gnorismoneura zetessima
- Gymnasura semilutea
- Helcystogramma albilepidotum
- Helcystogramma angustum
- Helcystogramma bicuneum
- Helcystogramma brevinodium
- Helcystogramma ceriochrantum
- Helcystogramma flavifuscum
- Helcystogramma flavistictum
- Helcystogramma furvimaculare
- Helcystogramma hassenzanensis
- Helcystogramma imagibicuneum
- Helcystogramma imagitrijunctum
- Helcystogramma rectangulum
- Helcystogramma trijunctum
- Hellinsia gypsotes
- Hellinsia improbus
- Hellinsia ishiyamanus
- Hellinsia kuwayamai
- Hellinsia lacteolus
- Hellinsia logistes
- Hellinsia nigridactylus
- Hellinsia sichuana
- Hemaris fuciformis
- Hepialiscus nepalensis
- Hepialus xiaojinensis
- Herochroma cristata
- Herochroma curvata
- Herochroma mansfieldi
- Herochroma pallensia
- Herochroma perspicillata
- Herochroma rosulata
- Herochroma sinapiaria
- Herochroma supraviridaria
- Herpetogramma pseudomagna
- Herpetogramma rudis
- Hippotion celerio
- Hiroshia nanlingana
- Homaloxestis aciformis
- Homaloxestis eccentropa
- Homaloxestis ellipsoidea
- Homaloxestis hesperis
- Homaloxestis liochlaena
- Homaloxestis mucroraphis
- Hydrelia aggerata
- Hydrelia bella
- Hydrelia castaria
- Hydrelia cingulata
- Hydrelia conspicuaria
- Hydrelia crocearia
- Hydrelia flammulata
- Hydrelia flavilinea
- Hydrelia impleta
- Hydrelia laetivirga
- Hydrelia latsaria
- Hydrelia leucogramma
- Hydrelia luteosparsata
- Hydrelia ochrearia
- Hydrelia parvularia
- Hydrelia pavonica
- Hydrelia rhodoptera
- Hydrelia rubraria
- Hydrelia rufigrisea
- Hydrelia rufinota
- Hydrelia sanguiflua
- Hydrelia sublatsaria
- Hyperoptica ptilocentra
- Hypersypnoides submarginata
- Hypeugoa
- Hyposidra aquilaria
- Hyposidra infixaria
- Imma caelestis
- Imma torophracta
- Isodemis proxima
- Issikiopteryx aurolaxa
- Issikiopteryx corona
- Issikiopteryx fornicata
- Issikiopteryx nigeriflava
- Issikiopteryx obtusanglua
- Issikiopteryx ophrysa
- Issikiopteryx parelongata
- Issikiopteryx rotundiconcava
- Issikiopteryx suiyangensis
- Issikiopteryx trichacera
- Issikiopteryx valvispinata
- Issikiopteryx zonophaera
- Juxtarctia multiguttata
- Kalocyrma decurtata
- Kalocyrma echita
- Katha nankunshanica
- Koedfoltos hackeri
- Krananda lucidaria
- Labdia citracma
- Lacydes spectabilis
- Lamacha
- Lamida obscura
- Lamprosema hoenei
- Lamprosema pectinalis
- Lamprosema tienmushanus
- Lecithocera contorta
- Lecithocera cuspidata
- Lecithocera didentata
- Lecithocera erebosa
- Lecithocera hiata
- Lecithocera lacunara
- Lecithocera licnitha
- Lecithocera meloda
- Lecithocera olinxana
- Lecithocera palmata
- Lecithocera petalana
- Lecithocera sabrata
- Lecithocera tridentata
- Leechia
- Limnaecia compsasis
- Lithosarctia y-albulum
- Lithosia taishanica
- Lithosia yuennanensis
- Lomographa guttalata
- Lomographa lungtanensis
- Lomographa perapicata
- Lophophelma calaurops
- Macrobrochis lucida
- Macrocilix ophrysa
- Macrocilix trinotata
- Macroglossum belis
- Macrothyatira fasciata
- Macrothyatira flavimargo
- Macrothyatira oblonga
- Macrothyatira subaureata
- Macrothyatira transitans
- Martyringa hoenei
- Mesastrape fulguraria
- Mesothyatira
- Metriochroa alboannulata
- Micrarctia
- Miltochrista convexa
- Miltochrista decussata
- Miltochrista delineata
- Miltochrista fasciata
- Miltochrista flexuosa
- Miltochrista inscripta
- Miltochrista sanguinea
- Miltochrista ziczac
- Mimicia
- Mocis ancilla
- Mocis annetta
- Mocis inferna
- Monema meyi
- Monema tanaognatha
- Murzinarctia
- Murzinoria
- Murzinowatsonia
- Mustilia zolotuhini
- Nacoleia immundalis
- Nacoleia perstygialis
- Nacoleia subalbalis
- Nannoarctia tripartita
- Nematopogon chalcophyllis
- Nemophora divina
- Neobarbara
- Nephoploca
- Nordstromia angula
- Nordstromia fusca
- Nordstromia fuscula
- Nordstromia heba
- Nordstromia niva
- Nordstromia unilinea
- Nosophora insignis
- Nosphistica fenestrata
- Nosphistica minutispina
- Nosphistica orientana
- Nosphistica parameocola
- Obeidia gigantearia
- Oberthueria jiatongae
- Oberthueria yandu
- Oidaematophorus iwatensis
- Oreta bilineata
- Ornativalva plutelliformis
- Pachista
- Pachista superans
- Pachyodes amplificata
- Pachyodes jianfengensis
- Pachyodes leucomelanaria
- Pachyodes novata
- Pachyodes ornataria
- Pachyodes subtritus
- Palpita curvispina
- Palpita inusitata
- Palpita minuscula
- Palpita parvifraterna
- Paracymoriza truncata
- Parafuscoptilia
- Parahepialus
- Paralbara achlyscarleta
- Paralbara pallidinota
- Paralbara spicula
- Parapsestis dabashana
- Parapsestis implicata
- Parapsestis meleagris
- Parapsestis wernyaminta
- Parasa minwangi
- Parasa undulata
- Paraspilarctia klapperichi
- Paratorna pterofulva
- Paratorna pteropolia
- Patania expictalis
- Patania iopasalis
- Pediasia batangensis
- Pediasia dolicanthia
- Pediasia echinulatia
- Pediasia jecondica
- Pediasia perselloides
- Pediasia yangtseella
- Phalera flavescens
- Phragmataecia innotata
- Phrealcia steueri
- Platyptilia isodactylus
- Problepsis conjunctiva
- Problepsis eucircota
- Problepsis paredra
- Problepsis phoebearia
- Problepsis subreferta
- Pseudalbara fuscifascia
- Pseudalbara parvula
- Pseudanabasis
- Pseudiragoides florianii
- Pseudiragoides itsova
- Pseudocroesia
- Pseudostegania distinctaria
- Pseudostegania lijiangensis
- Pseudostegania qinlingensis
- Pseudostegania straminearia
- Pseudostegania yargongaria
- Pseudostegania zhoui
- Psidopala apicalis
- Psidopala ornata
- Psidopala paeoniola
- Psidopala roseola
- Psidopala undulans
- Psidopala warreni
- Pterophorus elaeopus
- Pycnarmon chinensis
- Pycnarmon geminipuncta
- Pycnarmon radiata
- Pyrausta bieti
- Pyrausta contigualis
- Pyrausta contristalis
- Pyrausta curvalis
- Pyrausta draesekei
- Pyrausta ecteinalis
- Pyrausta genialis
- Pyrausta griseocilialis
- Pyrausta hampsoni
- Pyrausta leechi
- Pyrausta mandarinalis
- Pyrausta moupinalis
- Pyrausta mystica
- Pyrausta oberthuri
- Pyrausta obscurior
- Pyrausta obstipalis
- Pyrausta odontogrammalis
- Pyrausta persimilis
- Pyrausta postalbalis
- Pyrausta punctilinealis
- Pyrausta pygmealis
- Pyrausta quadrimaculalis
- Pyrausta rectifascialis
- Pyrausta rueckbeili
- Pyrausta rufalis
- Pyrausta splendida
- Pyrausta strigatalis
- Pyrausta subfuscalis
- Pyrausta sumptuosalis
- Pyrausta syfanialis
- Pyrausta szetschwanalis
- Pyrausta tapaishanensis
- Pyrausta thibetalis
- Pyrausta tortualis
- Pyrausta tschelialis
- Pyrausta zeitunalis
- Rhagoba obvellata
- Rivula curvifera
- Rondotia diaphana
- Sabra taibaishanensis
- Schistomitra joelmineti
- Sciota obscurella
- Scirpophaga adunctella
- Scirpophaga auristrigellus
- Scirpophaga gotoi
- Scirpophaga humilis
- Scirpophaga khasis
- Scirpophaga linguatella
- Scirpophaga parvalis
- Scirpophaga whalleyi
- Scopula ambigua
- Scopula anfractata
- Scopula asthena
- Scopula bifalsaria
- Scopula bimacularia
- Scopula delitata
- Scopula dubernardi
- Scopula emma
- Scopula farinaria
- Scopula fibulata
- Scopula francki
- Scopula hesycha
- Scopula klaphecki
- Scopula lutearia
- Scopula manes
- Scopula manifesta
- Scopula marcidaria
- Scopula mendicaria
- Scopula modicaria
- Scopula oxysticha
- Scopula parallelaria
- Scopula polyterpes
- Scopula proximaria
- Scopula pseudocorrivalaria
- Scopula rivularia
- Scopula rufigrisea
- Scopula sedataria
- Scopula sinopersonata
- Scopula sjostedti
- Scopula subpulchellata
- Scopula szechuanensis
- Scopula tsekuensis
- Scopula yihe
- Scythropiodes tribula
- Semiothisa cinerearia
- Silk worm
- Silk worm cocoon demineralizing
- Spatalistis aglaoxantha
- Spatulignatha arcuata
- Spatulignatha chrysopteryx
- Spatulignatha longizonalis
- Spilarctia nydia
- Spilarctia zhangmuna
- Spilosoma erythrozona
- Spilosoma lubricipeda
- Stegasta variana
- Stenopsestis bruna
- Stenoptilia poculi
- Stigmatophora acerba
- Stigmatophora chekiangensis
- Stigmatophora confusa
- Stigmatophora conjuncta
- Stigmatophora grisea
- Stigmatophora hainanensis
- Stigmatophora likiangensis
- Stigmatophora obraztsovi
- Stigmatophora rubivena
- Stigmella circumargentea
- Stigmella fervida
- Stigmella kao
- Stigmella lithocarpella
- Stigmella vandrieli
- Streltzovia
- Syllepte amoyalis
- Syllepte capnosalis
- Syllepte fuscoinvalidalis
- Syllepte fuscomarginalis
- Syllepte hoenei
- Syllepte invalidalis
- Syllepte lucidalis
- Syllepte mandarinalis
- Syllepte ningpoalis
- Syllepte pallidinotalis
- Syllepte proctizonalis
- Syllepte rhyparialis
- Synersaga breviclavata
- Synersaga brevidigitata
- Talis cornutella
- Talis erenhotica
- Talis qinghaiella
- Teliphasa erythrina
- Teliphasa hamata
- Teliphasa similalbifusa
- Thitarodes baimaensis
- Thitarodes bibelteus
- Thitarodes biruensis
- Thitarodes deqinensis
- Thitarodes latitegumenus
- Thitarodes pui
- Thymistadopsis undulifera
- Torodora galera
- Torodora manoconta
- Tortrix sinapina
- Trichophysetis aurantidiscalis
- Trichophysetis bipunctalis
- Trichophysetis hampsoni
- Tridrepana bifurcata
- Tridrepana hainana
- Trifurcula sinica
- Udea albostriata
- Udea curvata
- Udea prunalis
- Ugia insuspecta
- Vellonifer doncasteri
- Vladimirea krasilnikovae
- Watsonarctia
- Wernya cyrtoma
- Wernya hamigigantea
- Wernya lineofracta
- Wernya sechuana
- Xestia caelebs
- Ypsolopha atrobrunnella
- Ypsolopha costibasella
- Ypsolopha diana
- Ypsolopha helva
- Ypsolopha lutisplendida
- Ypsolopha melanocnista
- Ypsolopha mienshani
- Ypsolopha parodaula
- Ypsolopha rhytidota
- Ypsolopha sordida
- Ypsolopha yangi
- Yucilix
- Zebronia ornatalis
