= Catocala kaki =

Scientific classification
- Kingdom: Animalia
- Phylum: Arthropoda
- Class: Insecta
- Order: Lepidoptera
- Superfamily: Noctuoidea
- Family: Erebidae
- Genus: Catocala
- Species: C. kaki

Binomial name
- Catocala kaki Ishizuka, 2003

Species of moth

Catocala kaki is a moth in the family Erebidae. It is found in China (Shaanxi).
