= Scopula dubernardi =

Scientific classification
- Domain: Eukaryota
- Kingdom: Animalia
- Phylum: Arthropoda
- Class: Insecta
- Order: Lepidoptera
- Family: Geometridae
- Genus: Scopula
- Species: S. dubernardi

Binomial name
- Scopula dubernardi (Oberthür, 1923)

Synonyms
- Phyletis dubernardi Oberthur, 1923

Species of geometer moth in subfamily Sterrhinae

Scopula dubernardi is a moth of the family Geometridae. It is found in China.
