= Pyrausta sumptuosalis =

Scientific classification
- Domain: Eukaryota
- Kingdom: Animalia
- Phylum: Arthropoda
- Class: Insecta
- Order: Lepidoptera
- Family: Crambidae
- Genus: Pyrausta
- Species: P. sumptuosalis

Binomial name
- Pyrausta sumptuosalis Caradja, 1927

Species of moth

Pyrausta sumptuosalis is a moth of the family Crambidae. It is found in Sichuan, China.
