= Scopula farinaria =

Scientific classification
- Domain: Eukaryota
- Kingdom: Animalia
- Phylum: Arthropoda
- Class: Insecta
- Order: Lepidoptera
- Family: Geometridae
- Genus: Scopula
- Species: S. farinaria

Binomial name
- Scopula farinaria (Leech, 1897)

Synonyms
- Acidalia farinaria Leech, 1897

Species of geometer moth in subfamily Sterrhinae

Scopula farinaria is a moth of the family Geometridae, described by John Henry Leech in 1897 from western China.
