= Scopula oxysticha =

Scientific classification
- Kingdom: Animalia
- Phylum: Arthropoda
- Clade: Pancrustacea
- Class: Insecta
- Order: Lepidoptera
- Family: Geometridae
- Genus: Scopula
- Species: S. oxysticha

Binomial name
- Scopula oxysticha Prout, 1938

Species of geometer moth in subfamily Sterrhinae

Scopula oxysticha is a moth of the family Geometridae. It is found in China (Yunnan).
