= Catocala ellamajor =

Scientific classification
- Kingdom: Animalia
- Phylum: Arthropoda
- Class: Insecta
- Order: Lepidoptera
- Superfamily: Noctuoidea
- Family: Erebidae
- Genus: Catocala
- Species: C. ellamajor

Binomial name
- Catocala ellamajor Ishizuka, 2010

Species of moth

Catocala ellamajor is a moth in the family Erebidae. It is known from Sichuan (China).

The forewing length is 35 mm (1.4 in). It resembles Catocala ella but is larger.
