= Scopula pseudocorrivalaria =

Scientific classification
- Domain: Eukaryota
- Kingdom: Animalia
- Phylum: Arthropoda
- Class: Insecta
- Order: Lepidoptera
- Family: Geometridae
- Genus: Scopula
- Species: S. pseudocorrivalaria

Binomial name
- Scopula pseudocorrivalaria (Wehrli, 1932)

Synonyms
- Acidalia pseudocorrivalaria Wehrli, 1932

Species of geometer moth in subfamily Sterrhinae

Scopula pseudocorrivalaria is a moth of the family Geometridae. It is found in southern China.
