= Catocala jouga =

Scientific classification
- Kingdom: Animalia
- Phylum: Arthropoda
- Class: Insecta
- Order: Lepidoptera
- Superfamily: Noctuoidea
- Family: Erebidae
- Genus: Catocala
- Species: C. jouga

Binomial name
- Catocala jouga Ishizuka, 2003

Species of moth

Catocala jouga is a moth in the family Erebidae. It is found in China (Yunnan) and Vietnam.
