= Eupithecia cichisa =

Scientific classification
- Kingdom: Animalia
- Phylum: Arthropoda
- Clade: Pancrustacea
- Class: Insecta
- Order: Lepidoptera
- Family: Geometridae
- Genus: Eupithecia
- Species: E. cichisa

Binomial name
- Eupithecia cichisa L. B. Prout, 1939

Synonyms
- Euchoeca cichisa

Species of moth

Eupithecia cichisa is a moth in the family Geometridae first described by Louis Beethoven Prout in 1939. It is found in western China.
