= Eupithecia spissata =

Scientific classification
- Kingdom: Animalia
- Phylum: Arthropoda
- Clade: Pancrustacea
- Class: Insecta
- Order: Lepidoptera
- Family: Geometridae
- Genus: Eupithecia
- Species: E. spissata

Binomial name
- Eupithecia spissata Mironov & Galsworthy, 2006

Species of moth

Eupithecia spissata is a moth in the family Geometridae. It is endemic to Southwestern China (Sichuan).

The wingspan is about 20 mm (0.79 in).
