= Eupithecia hongxiangae =

Scientific classification
- Kingdom: Animalia
- Phylum: Arthropoda
- Clade: Pancrustacea
- Class: Insecta
- Order: Lepidoptera
- Family: Geometridae
- Genus: Eupithecia
- Species: E. hongxiangae

Binomial name
- Eupithecia hongxiangae Mironov & Galsworthy, 2011

Species of moth

Eupithecia hongxiangae is a moth in the family Geometridae. It is found in Gansu and Henan, China. It is named for Han Hongxiang, Chinese lepidopterogist.

The wingspan is about 18.5–22 mm (0.73–0.87 in).
