= Catocala gansan =

Scientific classification
- Kingdom: Animalia
- Phylum: Arthropoda
- Class: Insecta
- Order: Lepidoptera
- Superfamily: Noctuoidea
- Family: Erebidae
- Genus: Catocala
- Species: C. gansan

Binomial name
- Catocala gansan Ishizuka & M. Wang, 2013

Species of moth

Catocala gansan is a moth in the family Erebidae. It is found in China (Yunnan).
