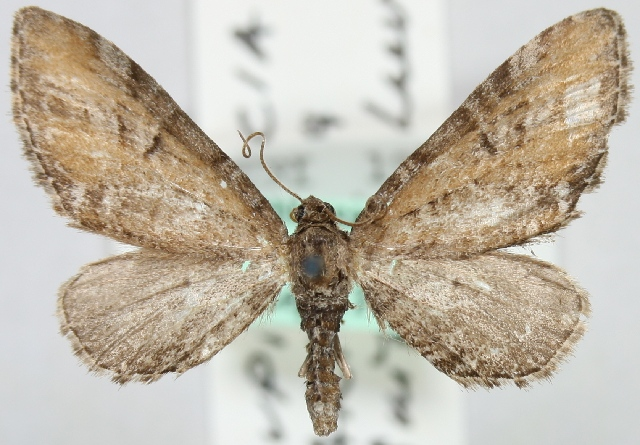

Scientific classification
- Domain: Eukaryota
- Kingdom: Animalia
- Phylum: Arthropoda
- Class: Insecta
- Order: Lepidoptera
- Family: Geometridae
- Genus: Eupithecia
- Species: E. subbrunneata

Binomial name
- Eupithecia subbrunneata Dietze, 1904

Synonyms
- Catarina carissima Vojnits & Laever, 1973; Eupithecia carissima; Eupithecia amita Dietze, 1910

= Eupithecia subbrunneata =

Species of moth

Eupithecia subbrunneata is a moth in the family Geometridae. It is found in China and Russia (Siberia and the Russian Far East).
