= Coleophora fengxianica =

Scientific classification
- Kingdom: Animalia
- Phylum: Arthropoda
- Class: Insecta
- Order: Lepidoptera
- Family: Coleophoridae
- Genus: Coleophora
- Species: C. fengxianica

Binomial name
- Coleophora fengxianica H.H. Li & L.Y. Zheng, 2000

Species of moth

Coleophora fengxianica is a moth of the family Coleophoridae. It is found in Shaanxi, China.
