= Pyrausta draesekei =

Scientific classification
- Domain: Eukaryota
- Kingdom: Animalia
- Phylum: Arthropoda
- Class: Insecta
- Order: Lepidoptera
- Family: Crambidae
- Genus: Pyrausta
- Species: P. draesekei

Binomial name
- Pyrausta draesekei Caradja, 1927

Species of moth

Pyrausta draesekei is a moth in the family Crambidae. It was described by Aristide Caradja in 1927. It is found in China.
