= Scopula sinopersonata =

Scientific classification
- Kingdom: Animalia
- Phylum: Arthropoda
- Class: Insecta
- Order: Lepidoptera
- Family: Geometridae
- Genus: Scopula
- Species: S. sinopersonata

Binomial name
- Scopula sinopersonata (Wehrli, 1932)

Synonyms
- Acidalia sinopersonata Wehrli, 1932

Species of geometer moth in subfamily Sterrhinae

Scopula sinopersonata is a moth of the family Geometridae. It is found in China.
