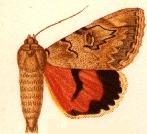

Scientific classification
- Kingdom: Animalia
- Phylum: Arthropoda
- Class: Insecta
- Order: Lepidoptera
- Superfamily: Noctuoidea
- Family: Erebidae
- Genus: Catocala
- Species: C. juncta

Binomial name
- Catocala juncta Staudinger, 1889

= Catocala juncta =

Species of moth

Catocala juncta is a moth of the family Erebidae first described by Staudinger in 1889. It is found in Xinjiang, China.
