= Eupithecia minutula =

Scientific classification
- Kingdom: Animalia
- Phylum: Arthropoda
- Clade: Pancrustacea
- Class: Insecta
- Order: Lepidoptera
- Family: Geometridae
- Genus: Eupithecia
- Species: E. minutula

Binomial name
- Eupithecia minutula Mironov & Galsworthy, 2004

Species of moth

Eupithecia minutula is a moth in the family Geometridae. It is known from south-western China in northern Yunnan and eastern Tibet.

The wingspan is about 14–17 mm.
