= Eupithecia serpentigena =

Scientific classification
- Kingdom: Animalia
- Phylum: Arthropoda
- Clade: Pancrustacea
- Class: Insecta
- Order: Lepidoptera
- Family: Geometridae
- Genus: Eupithecia
- Species: E. serpentigena

Binomial name
- Eupithecia serpentigena Mironov & Galsworthy, 2006

Species of moth

Eupithecia serpentigena is a moth in the family Geometridae. It is endemic to Southwestern China (Sichuan). Only a single female from the Wanglang Nature Reserve is known.

The wingspan is 21 mm (0.83 in) for the holotype.
