= Catocala maculata =

Scientific classification
- Kingdom: Animalia
- Phylum: Arthropoda
- Class: Insecta
- Order: Lepidoptera
- Superfamily: Noctuoidea
- Family: Erebidae
- Genus: Catocala
- Species: C. maculata

Binomial name
- Catocala maculata Vincent, 1919

Species of moth

Catocala maculata is a moth in the family Erebidae first described by Vincent in 1919. It is found in China.
