= Catocala sinyaevi =

Scientific classification
- Kingdom: Animalia
- Phylum: Arthropoda
- Class: Insecta
- Order: Lepidoptera
- Superfamily: Noctuoidea
- Family: Erebidae
- Genus: Catocala
- Species: C. sinyaevi

Binomial name
- Catocala sinyaevi Sviridov, 2004

Species of moth

Catocala sinyaevi is a moth in the family Erebidae first described by Andreĭ Valentinovich Sviridov in 2004. It is found in central China.
