= Scopula lutearia =

Scientific classification
- Domain: Eukaryota
- Kingdom: Animalia
- Phylum: Arthropoda
- Class: Insecta
- Order: Lepidoptera
- Family: Geometridae
- Genus: Scopula
- Species: S. lutearia

Binomial name
- Scopula lutearia (Leech, 1897)

Synonyms
- Acidalia lutearia Leech, 1897

Species of geometer moth in subfamily Sterrhinae

Scopula lutearia is a moth of the family Geometridae. It is found in central China.
