= Eupithecia luctuosa =

Scientific classification
- Kingdom: Animalia
- Phylum: Arthropoda
- Clade: Pancrustacea
- Class: Insecta
- Order: Lepidoptera
- Family: Geometridae
- Genus: Eupithecia
- Species: E. luctuosa

Binomial name
- Eupithecia luctuosa Mironov & Galsworthy, 2004

Species of moth

Eupithecia luctuosa is a moth in the family Geometridae. It is found in south-eastern China (Fujian).

The wingspan is about 17 mm. The fore- and hindwings are mid brown.
