= Coleophora ochroptera =

Scientific classification
- Kingdom: Animalia
- Phylum: Arthropoda
- Class: Insecta
- Order: Lepidoptera
- Family: Coleophoridae
- Genus: Coleophora
- Species: C. ochroptera

Binomial name
- Coleophora ochroptera H.H. Li, 2004

Species of moth

Coleophora ochroptera is a moth of the family Coleophoridae. It is found in Xinjiang, China.
