= Eupithecia stomachosa =

Scientific classification
- Kingdom: Animalia
- Phylum: Arthropoda
- Clade: Pancrustacea
- Class: Insecta
- Order: Lepidoptera
- Family: Geometridae
- Genus: Eupithecia
- Species: E. stomachosa

Binomial name
- Eupithecia stomachosa Vojnits, 1980

Species of moth

Eupithecia stomachosa is a moth in the family Geometridae. It is found in China (Shensi).
