= Pyrausta griseocilialis =

Scientific classification
- Domain: Eukaryota
- Kingdom: Animalia
- Phylum: Arthropoda
- Class: Insecta
- Order: Lepidoptera
- Family: Crambidae
- Genus: Pyrausta
- Species: P. griseocilialis

Binomial name
- Pyrausta griseocilialis South in Leech & South, 1901

Species of moth

Pyrausta griseocilialis is a moth in the family Crambidae. It was described by South in 1901. It is found in China.
