= Coleophora yunnanica =

Scientific classification
- Kingdom: Animalia
- Phylum: Arthropoda
- Clade: Pancrustacea
- Class: Insecta
- Order: Lepidoptera
- Family: Coleophoridae
- Genus: Coleophora
- Species: C. yunnanica

Binomial name
- Coleophora yunnanica Baldizzone, 1989

Species of moth

Coleophora yunnanica is a moth of the family Coleophoridae. It is found in Yunnan, China.

The wingspan is 12–13 mm. The larval host plant is unknown.
