= Scopula francki =

Scientific classification
- Domain: Eukaryota
- Kingdom: Animalia
- Phylum: Arthropoda
- Class: Insecta
- Order: Lepidoptera
- Family: Geometridae
- Genus: Scopula
- Species: S. francki

Binomial name
- Scopula francki Prout, 1935

Species of geometer moth in subfamily Sterrhinae

Scopula francki is a moth of the family Geometridae. It was described by Prout in 1935. It is found in south-western China.
