= Eupithecia nigristriata =

Scientific classification
- Kingdom: Animalia
- Phylum: Arthropoda
- Clade: Pancrustacea
- Class: Insecta
- Order: Lepidoptera
- Family: Geometridae
- Genus: Eupithecia
- Species: E. nigristriata

Binomial name
- Eupithecia nigristriata Mironov & Galsworthy, 2004

Species of moth

Eupithecia nigristriata is a moth in the family Geometridae. It is found in Qinghai and Tibet, western China.

The wingspan is about 17–18 mm.
