= Coleophora sinensis =

Scientific classification
- Kingdom: Animalia
- Phylum: Arthropoda
- Class: Insecta
- Order: Lepidoptera
- Family: Coleophoridae
- Genus: Coleophora
- Species: C. sinensis

Binomial name
- Coleophora sinensis Yang, 1983

Species of moth

Coleophora sinensis (Chinese larch casebearer) is a moth of the family Coleophoridae. It is found in Shanxi and Hebei provinces of China.

The larvae feed on the needles of Larix gmelinii var. principis-rupprechtii.
