= Eupithecia honesta =

Scientific classification
- Kingdom: Animalia
- Phylum: Arthropoda
- Clade: Pancrustacea
- Class: Insecta
- Order: Lepidoptera
- Family: Geometridae
- Genus: Eupithecia
- Species: E. honesta

Binomial name
- Eupithecia honesta Mironov & Galsworthy, 2005

Species of moth

Eupithecia honesta is a moth in the family Geometridae. It is found in China (the mountains along the border between Tibet and Yunnan).

The wingspan is about 19–22 mm. The forewings are pale orange brown and the hindwings are white.
