= Coleophora estriatella =

Scientific classification
- Kingdom: Animalia
- Phylum: Arthropoda
- Class: Insecta
- Order: Lepidoptera
- Family: Coleophoridae
- Genus: Coleophora
- Species: C. estriatella

Binomial name
- Coleophora estriatella Li & Zheng, 1999

Species of moth

Coleophora estriatella is a moth of the family Coleophoridae. It is found in China.

The wingspan is about 17.5 mm.
