= Pyrausta persimilis =

Scientific classification
- Domain: Eukaryota
- Kingdom: Animalia
- Phylum: Arthropoda
- Class: Insecta
- Order: Lepidoptera
- Family: Crambidae
- Genus: Pyrausta
- Species: P. persimilis

Binomial name
- Pyrausta persimilis Caradja, 1932

Species of moth

Pyrausta persimilis is a moth in the family Crambidae. It was described by Aristide Caradja in 1932. It is found in Sichuan, China.
