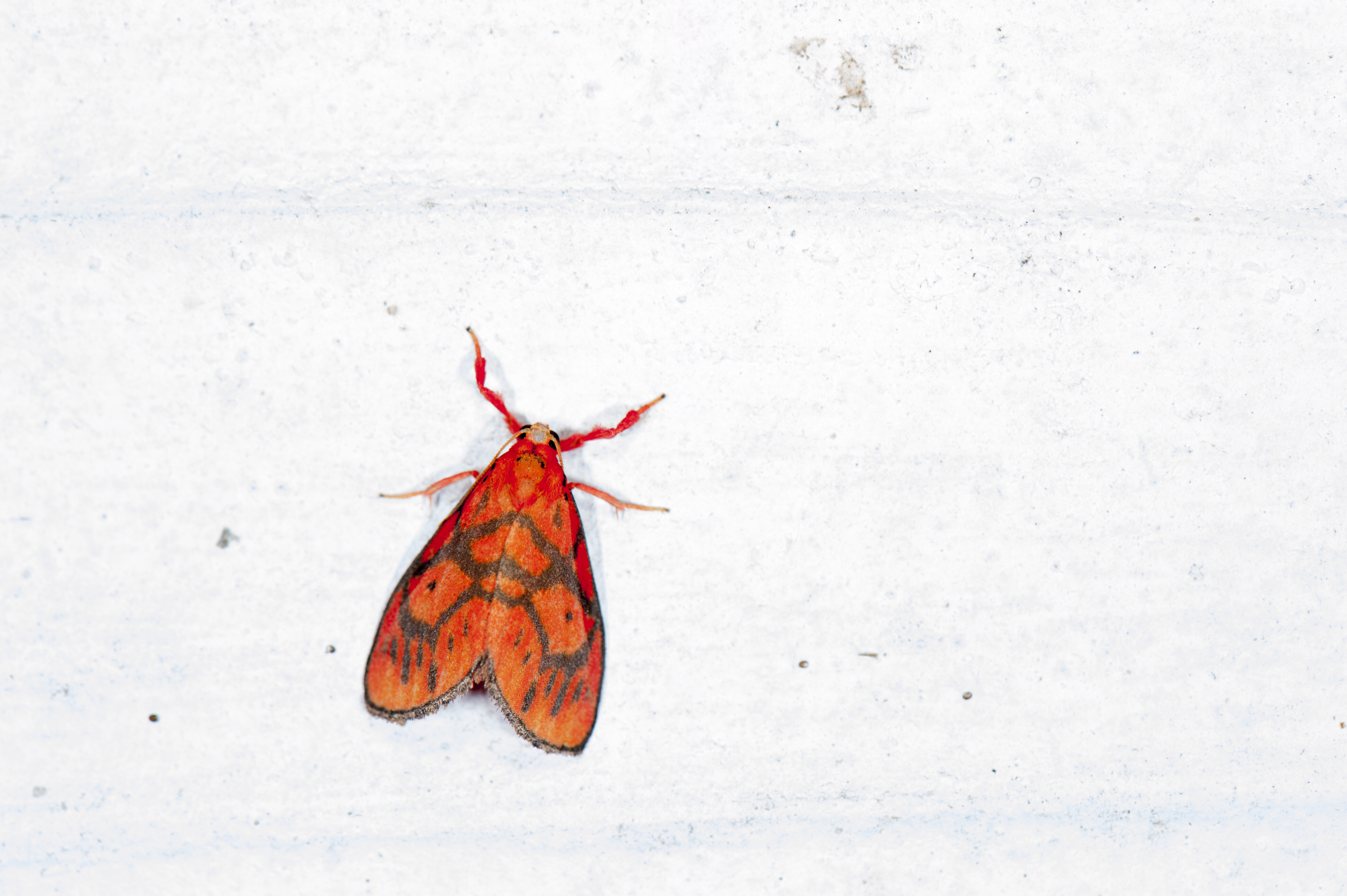

Scientific classification
- Domain: Eukaryota
- Kingdom: Animalia
- Phylum: Arthropoda
- Class: Insecta
- Order: Lepidoptera
- Superfamily: Noctuoidea
- Family: Erebidae
- Subfamily: Arctiinae
- Tribe: Lithosiini
- Genus: Cornicornuta; Volynkin, 2019
- Species: C. convexa

Binomial name
- Cornicornuta convexa (Wileman, 1910)

Synonyms
- Ammatho convexa (Wileman, 1910); Asura cruciata Matsumura, 1927; Barsine convexa (Wileman, 1910); Conicornuta convexa (Wileman, 1910); Miltochrista convexa Wileman, 1910; Miltochrista cardinalis

= Cornicornuta =

Species of moth

Cornicornuta convexa is a species in the moth family Erebidae, the only species of the genus Cornicornuta. It is found in Taiwan, China, and Southeast Asia.

The wingspan is 20–30 mm (0.79–1.18 in). Adults have been recorded on wing in April.
