= Eupithecia opicata =

Scientific classification
- Kingdom: Animalia
- Phylum: Arthropoda
- Clade: Pancrustacea
- Class: Insecta
- Order: Lepidoptera
- Family: Geometridae
- Genus: Eupithecia
- Species: E. opicata

Binomial name
- Eupithecia opicata Mironov & Galsworthy, 2004

Species of moth

Eupithecia opicata is a moth in the family Geometridae. It is found in Gansu, western China.

The wingspan is about 21–22 mmfor males.
