= Coleophora parilis =

Scientific classification
- Kingdom: Animalia
- Phylum: Arthropoda
- Class: Insecta
- Order: Lepidoptera
- Family: Coleophoridae
- Genus: Coleophora
- Species: C. parilis

Binomial name
- Coleophora parilis H.H.Li, 2005

Species of moth

Coleophora parilis is a moth of the family Coleophoridae. It is found in Inner Mongolia, China.

The wingspan is 8.5-13.5 mm. The species is nocturnal.
