= Eupithecia mediocincta =

Scientific classification
- Kingdom: Animalia
- Phylum: Arthropoda
- Clade: Pancrustacea
- Class: Insecta
- Order: Lepidoptera
- Family: Geometridae
- Genus: Eupithecia
- Species: E. mediocincta

Binomial name
- Eupithecia mediocincta Mironov & Galsworthy, 2004

Species of moth

Eupithecia mediocincta is a moth in the family Geometridae. It is found in central China in Gansu, Sichuan, and Shaanxi provinces. The wingspan is about 19–21 mm. The fore- and hindwings are reddish brown.
