= Eupithecia severa =

Scientific classification
- Kingdom: Animalia
- Phylum: Arthropoda
- Clade: Pancrustacea
- Class: Insecta
- Order: Lepidoptera
- Family: Geometridae
- Genus: Eupithecia
- Species: E. severa

Binomial name
- Eupithecia severa Mironov & Galsworthy, 2006

Species of moth

Eupithecia severa is a moth in the family Geometridae. It is endemic to central China (Shaanxi).

The wingspan is about 18 millimetres (0.71 in).
