= Scopula sjostedti =

Scientific classification
- Domain: Eukaryota
- Kingdom: Animalia
- Phylum: Arthropoda
- Class: Insecta
- Order: Lepidoptera
- Family: Geometridae
- Genus: Scopula
- Species: S. sjostedti

Binomial name
- Scopula sjostedti Djakonov, 1936

Species of geometer moth in subfamily Sterrhinae

Scopula sjostedti is a moth of the family Geometridae. It is found in China.
