= Catocala haitzi =

Scientific classification
- Kingdom: Animalia
- Phylum: Arthropoda
- Class: Insecta
- Order: Lepidoptera
- Superfamily: Noctuoidea
- Family: Erebidae
- Genus: Catocala
- Species: C. haitzi

Binomial name
- Catocala haitzi (O. Bang-Haas, 1936)

Synonyms
- Mormonia haitzi Bang-Haas, 1936

Species of moth

Catocala haitzi is a moth in the family Erebidae first described by Otto Bang-Haas in 1936. It is found in Gansu, China.
