= Catocala xizangensis =

Scientific classification
- Kingdom: Animalia
- Phylum: Arthropoda
- Class: Insecta
- Order: Lepidoptera
- Superfamily: Noctuoidea
- Family: Erebidae
- Genus: Catocala
- Species: C. xizangensis

Binomial name
- Catocala xizangensis (Y.X. Chen, 1991)

Synonyms
- Ephesia xizangensis Y.X. Chen, 1991

Species of moth

Catocala xizangensis is a moth in the family Erebidae. It is found in China (Xizang).
