= Eupithecia admiranda =

Scientific classification
- Kingdom: Animalia
- Phylum: Arthropoda
- Clade: Pancrustacea
- Class: Insecta
- Order: Lepidoptera
- Family: Geometridae
- Genus: Eupithecia
- Species: E. admiranda

Binomial name
- Eupithecia admiranda Mironov & Galsworthy, 2011

Species of moth

Eupithecia wangi is a moth in the family Geometridae. It is found in Shaanxi and Tibet, China.

The wingspan is about 22–24 mm (0.87–0.94 in).
