= Coleophora varisequens =

Scientific classification
- Kingdom: Animalia
- Phylum: Arthropoda
- Class: Insecta
- Order: Lepidoptera
- Family: Coleophoridae
- Genus: Coleophora
- Species: C. varisequens

Binomial name
- Coleophora varisequens H.H.Li, 2005

Species of moth

Coleophora varisequens is a moth of the family Coleophoridae. It is found in Inner Mongolia, China.

The wingspan is 9–12 mm.
