= Catocala lehmanni =

Scientific classification
- Kingdom: Animalia
- Phylum: Arthropoda
- Clade: Pancrustacea
- Class: Insecta
- Order: Lepidoptera
- Superfamily: Noctuoidea
- Family: Erebidae
- Genus: Catocala
- Species: C. lehmanni

Binomial name
- Catocala lehmanni Speidel, Ivinskis & Saldaitis, 2008

Species of moth

Catocala lehmanni is a moth in the family Erebidae. It is known from Sichuan (China). It is named for Lutz Lehmann.

The wingspan is 53 mm (2.1 in).
