= Scopula ambigua =

Scientific classification
- Kingdom: Animalia
- Phylum: Arthropoda
- Class: Insecta
- Order: Lepidoptera
- Family: Geometridae
- Genus: Scopula
- Species: S. ambigua

Binomial name
- Scopula ambigua Prout, 1935

Species of geometer moth in subfamily Sterrhinae

Scopula ambigua is a moth of the family Geometridae. It was described by Prout in 1935. It is endemic to China.
