= Scopula bimacularia =

Scientific classification
- Domain: Eukaryota
- Kingdom: Animalia
- Phylum: Arthropoda
- Class: Insecta
- Order: Lepidoptera
- Family: Geometridae
- Genus: Scopula
- Species: S. bimacularia

Binomial name
- Scopula bimacularia (Leech, 1897)

Synonyms
- Acidalia bimacularia Leech, 1897

Species of geometer moth in subfamily Sterrhinae

Scopula bimacularia is a moth of the family Geometridae. It was described by John Henry Leech in 1897. It is found in western China.
