= Eupithecia brevifasciaria =

Scientific classification
- Domain: Eukaryota
- Kingdom: Animalia
- Phylum: Arthropoda
- Class: Insecta
- Order: Lepidoptera
- Family: Geometridae
- Genus: Eupithecia
- Species: E. brevifasciaria

Binomial name
- Eupithecia brevifasciaria Leech, 1897

Synonyms
- Horisme brevifasciaria

Species of moth

Eupithecia brevifasciaria is a moth in the family Geometridae. It is found in China.
