= Coleophora gongliuensis =

Scientific classification
- Kingdom: Animalia
- Phylum: Arthropoda
- Class: Insecta
- Order: Lepidoptera
- Family: Coleophoridae
- Genus: Coleophora
- Species: C. gongliuensis

Binomial name
- Coleophora gongliuensis H.H. Li, 2004

Species of moth

Coleophora gongliuensis is a moth of the family Coleophoridae. It is found in Xinjiang, China.
