= Eupithecia duplex =

Scientific classification
- Domain: Eukaryota
- Kingdom: Animalia
- Phylum: Arthropoda
- Class: Insecta
- Order: Lepidoptera
- Family: Geometridae
- Genus: Eupithecia
- Species: E. duplex

Binomial name
- Eupithecia duplex Sterneck, 1931

Species of moth

Eupithecia duplex is a moth in the family Geometridae. It is found in China.
