= Catocala chenyixini =

Scientific classification
- Kingdom: Animalia
- Phylum: Arthropoda
- Class: Insecta
- Order: Lepidoptera
- Superfamily: Noctuoidea
- Family: Erebidae
- Genus: Catocala
- Species: C. chenyixini

Binomial name
- Catocala chenyixini Ishizuka, 2011

Synonyms
- Catocala patala f. montana Mell, 1933 (preocc. Catocala nevadaensis var. montana Beutenmüller, 1907)

Species of moth

Catocala chenyixini is a moth in the family Erebidae. It is found in China (Chekiang).
