= Coleophora jaculatoria =

Scientific classification
- Kingdom: Animalia
- Phylum: Arthropoda
- Class: Insecta
- Order: Lepidoptera
- Family: Coleophoridae
- Genus: Coleophora
- Species: C. jaculatoria

Binomial name
- Coleophora jaculatoria H.H. Li & L. Zheng, 1999

Species of moth

Coleophora jaculatoria is a moth of the family Coleophoridae. It is found in Shaanxi, China.
