= Eupithecia tibetana =

Scientific classification
- Kingdom: Animalia
- Phylum: Arthropoda
- Clade: Pancrustacea
- Class: Insecta
- Order: Lepidoptera
- Family: Geometridae
- Genus: Eupithecia
- Species: E. tibetana

Binomial name
- Eupithecia tibetana Mironov & Galsworthy, 2004

Species of moth

Eupithecia tibetana is a moth in the family Geometridae. It is found in China (Tibet).

The wingspan is about 20–23 mm.
