= Eupithecia julia =

Scientific classification
- Kingdom: Animalia
- Phylum: Arthropoda
- Clade: Pancrustacea
- Class: Insecta
- Order: Lepidoptera
- Family: Geometridae
- Genus: Eupithecia
- Species: E. julia

Binomial name
- Eupithecia julia Mironov & Galsworthy, 2004

Species of moth

Eupithecia julia is a moth in the family Geometridae. It is found in Sichuan, western China.

The wingspan is about 19–23 mm.
