= Scopula klaphecki =

Scientific classification
- Domain: Eukaryota
- Kingdom: Animalia
- Phylum: Arthropoda
- Class: Insecta
- Order: Lepidoptera
- Family: Geometridae
- Genus: Scopula
- Species: S. klaphecki

Binomial name
- Scopula klaphecki Prout, 1922

Synonyms
- Acidalia immutata chinensis Sterneck, 1927

Species of geometer moth in subfamily Sterrhinae

Scopula klaphecki is a moth of the family Geometridae. It was described by Prout in 1922. It is endemic to China.
