= Catocala naumanni =

Scientific classification
- Kingdom: Animalia
- Phylum: Arthropoda
- Class: Insecta
- Order: Lepidoptera
- Superfamily: Noctuoidea
- Family: Erebidae
- Genus: Catocala
- Species: C. naumanni

Binomial name
- Catocala naumanni Sviridov, 1996

Species of moth

Catocala naumanni is a moth in the family Erebidae first described by Andreĭ Valentinovich Sviridov in 1996. It is found in China.
