= Eupithecia fortis =

Scientific classification
- Kingdom: Animalia
- Phylum: Arthropoda
- Clade: Pancrustacea
- Class: Insecta
- Order: Lepidoptera
- Family: Geometridae
- Genus: Eupithecia
- Species: E. fortis

Binomial name
- Eupithecia fortis Mironov & Galsworthy, 2004

Species of moth

Eupithecia fortis is a moth in the family Geometridae. It is found in south-western China (Yunnan).
