= Eupithecia salubris =

Scientific classification
- Kingdom: Animalia
- Phylum: Arthropoda
- Clade: Pancrustacea
- Class: Insecta
- Order: Lepidoptera
- Family: Geometridae
- Genus: Eupithecia
- Species: E. salubris

Binomial name
- Eupithecia salubris Mironov & Galsworthy, 2004

Species of moth

Eupithecia salubris is a moth in the family Geometridae. It is found in western China (the mountains of Shanxi and Shaanxi).

The wingspan is about 14–16 mm. The fore- and hindwings are uniform pale brown.
