= Scopula bifalsaria =

Scientific classification
- Domain: Eukaryota
- Kingdom: Animalia
- Phylum: Arthropoda
- Class: Insecta
- Order: Lepidoptera
- Family: Geometridae
- Genus: Scopula
- Species: S. bifalsaria

Binomial name
- Scopula bifalsaria (Prout, 1913)

Synonyms
- Acidalia bifalsaria Prout, 1913; Acidalia falsaria Leech, 1897 (preocc.); Scopula bifalsaria grisescens Prout, 1916

Species of geometer moth in subfamily Sterrhinae

Scopula bifalsaria is a moth of the family Geometridae. It was described by Prout in 1913. It is endemic to China.

== Subspecies ==
- Scopula bifalsaria bifalsaria (western China)
- Scopula bifalsaria falsificata Prout, 1934 (Tibet)
