= Eupithecia placida =

Scientific classification
- Kingdom: Animalia
- Phylum: Arthropoda
- Clade: Pancrustacea
- Class: Insecta
- Order: Lepidoptera
- Family: Geometridae
- Genus: Eupithecia
- Species: E. placida

Binomial name
- Eupithecia placida Vojnits, 1984

Species of moth

Eupithecia placida is a moth in the family Geometridae. It is found in China.
