= Scopula anfractata =

Scientific classification
- Kingdom: Animalia
- Phylum: Arthropoda
- Class: Insecta
- Order: Lepidoptera
- Family: Geometridae
- Genus: Scopula
- Species: S. anfractata

Binomial name
- Scopula anfractata Sihvonen, 2005

Species of geometer moth in subfamily Sterrhinae

Scopula anfractata is a moth of the family Geometridae. It is found in China (Yunnan).
