= Ambulyx regia =

Scientific classification
- Kingdom: Animalia
- Phylum: Arthropoda
- Class: Insecta
- Order: Lepidoptera
- Family: Sphingidae
- Genus: Ambulyx
- Species: A. regia

Binomial name
- Ambulyx regia Eitschberger, 2006

Species of moth

Ambulyx regia is a species of moth of the family Sphingidae. It is found in the Guangxi region of China.
