= Eupithecia omniparens =

Scientific classification
- Domain: Eukaryota
- Kingdom: Animalia
- Phylum: Arthropoda
- Class: Insecta
- Order: Lepidoptera
- Family: Geometridae
- Genus: Eupithecia
- Species: E. omniparens

Binomial name
- Eupithecia omniparens Dietze, 1908

Species of moth

Eupithecia omniparens is a moth in the family Geometridae first described by Karl Dietze in 1908. It is found in China.
