= Eupithecia vana =

Scientific classification
- Kingdom: Animalia
- Phylum: Arthropoda
- Clade: Pancrustacea
- Class: Insecta
- Order: Lepidoptera
- Family: Geometridae
- Genus: Eupithecia
- Species: E. vana

Binomial name
- Eupithecia vana Vojnits, 1979

Synonyms
- Eupithecia abrepta Vojnits, 1979

Species of moth

Eupithecia vana is a moth in the family Geometridae. It is found in China, where it is known from the Shaanxi and Henan provinces. The species is on wing from mid-April to mid-May, and again from early to late August.
