= Hyperoptica =

Scientific classification
- Kingdom: Animalia
- Phylum: Arthropoda
- Class: Insecta
- Order: Lepidoptera
- Family: Xyloryctidae
- Genus: Hyperoptica; Meyrick in Caradja & Meyrick, 1934
- Species: H. ptilocentra

Binomial name
- Hyperoptica ptilocentra Meyrick, 1934

Monotypic moth genus in family Xyloryctidae

Hyperoptica ptilocentra is a moth in the family Xyloryctidae, and the only species in the genus Hyperoptica. The genus and species were both described by Edward Meyrick in 1934 and are found in China.
