= Pyrausta syfanialis =

Scientific classification
- Domain: Eukaryota
- Kingdom: Animalia
- Phylum: Arthropoda
- Class: Insecta
- Order: Lepidoptera
- Family: Crambidae
- Genus: Pyrausta
- Species: P. syfanialis

Binomial name
- Pyrausta syfanialis (Oberthür, 1893)

Synonyms
- Herbula syfanialis Oberthür, 1893

Species of moth

Pyrausta syfanialis is a moth in the family Crambidae. It was described by Oberthür in 1893. It is found in China (Tibet).
