= Catocala hymenoides =

Scientific classification
- Kingdom: Animalia
- Phylum: Arthropoda
- Class: Insecta
- Order: Lepidoptera
- Superfamily: Noctuoidea
- Family: Erebidae
- Genus: Catocala
- Species: C. hymenoides

Binomial name
- Catocala hymenoides (Draeseke, 1927)

Synonyms
- Ephesia hymenoides Draeseke, 1927

Species of moth

Catocala hymenoides is a moth in the family Erebidae first described by Johannes Draeseke in 1927. It is found in China.
