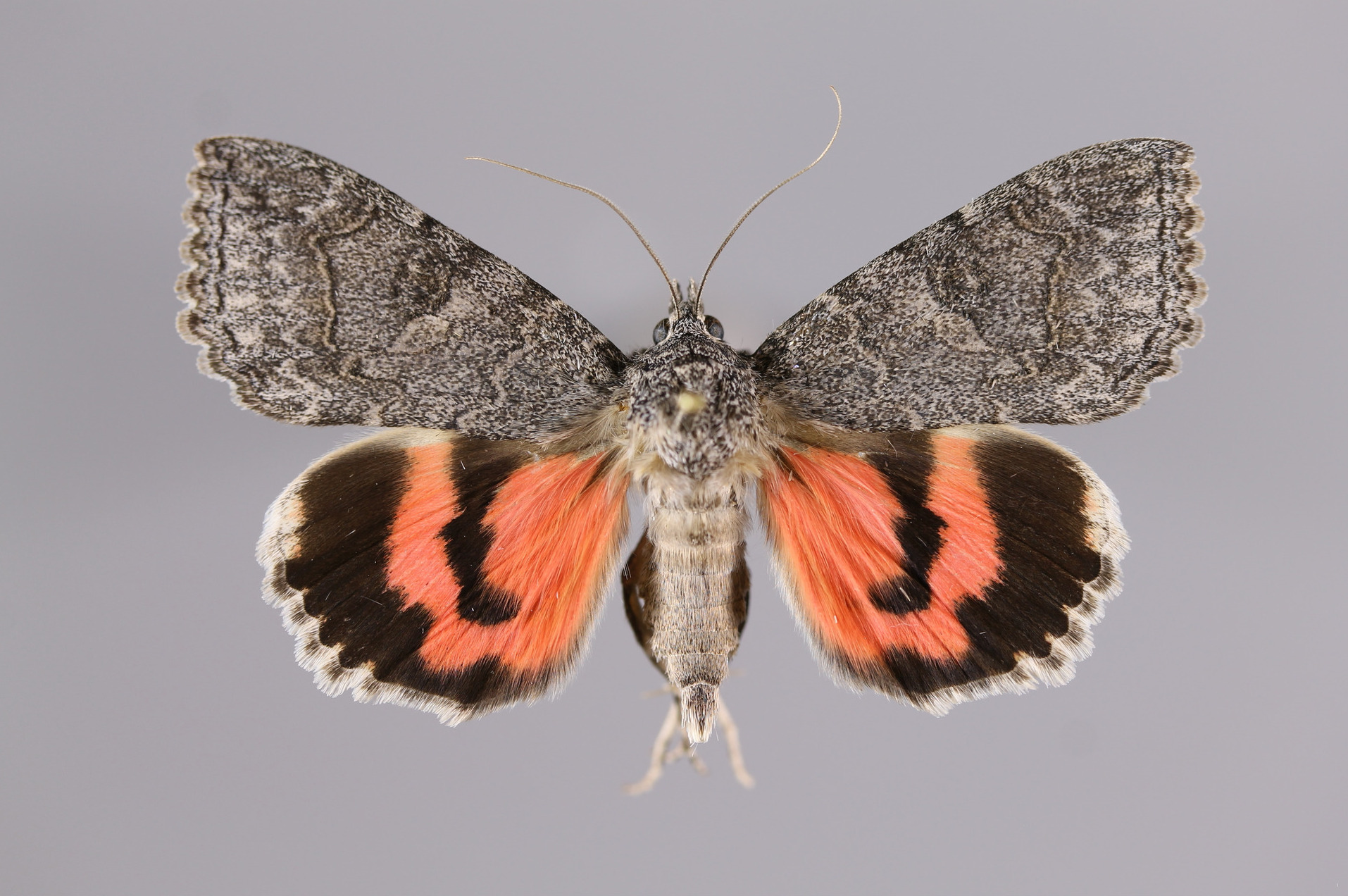

Scientific classification
- Kingdom: Animalia
- Phylum: Arthropoda
- Class: Insecta
- Order: Lepidoptera
- Superfamily: Noctuoidea
- Family: Erebidae
- Genus: Catocala
- Species: C. optima

Binomial name
- Catocala optima Staudinger, 1888

= Catocala optima =

Turanga underwing

Species of moth

Catocala optima, the Turanga underwing, is a moth of the family Erebidae. The species was first described by Otto Staudinger in 1888. It is found in Xinjiang, China.

The wingspan is 44–46 mm.
