= Eupithecia granata =

Scientific classification
- Kingdom: Animalia
- Phylum: Arthropoda
- Clade: Pancrustacea
- Class: Insecta
- Order: Lepidoptera
- Family: Geometridae
- Genus: Eupithecia
- Species: E. granata

Binomial name
- Eupithecia granata Vojnits, 1979

Species of moth

Eupithecia granata is a moth in the vast genus of Eupithecia in the family Geometridae. It is found in the Yunnan province of China.
