= Coleophora harbinensis =

Scientific classification
- Kingdom: Animalia
- Phylum: Arthropoda
- Class: Insecta
- Order: Lepidoptera
- Family: Coleophoridae
- Genus: Coleophora
- Species: C. harbinensis

Binomial name
- Coleophora harbinensis Li & Zheng, 1998

Species of moth

Coleophora harbinensis is a moth of the family Coleophoridae. It is found in China.
