= Eupithecia lilliputata =

Scientific classification
- Kingdom: Animalia
- Phylum: Arthropoda
- Clade: Pancrustacea
- Class: Insecta
- Order: Lepidoptera
- Family: Geometridae
- Genus: Eupithecia
- Species: E. lilliputata

Binomial name
- Eupithecia lilliputata Mironov & Galsworthy, 2011

Species of moth

Eupithecia lilliputata is a moth in the family Geometridae. It is found in Yunnan, China.

The wingspan is about 13–15 mm (0.51–0.59 in).
