= Pyrausta subfuscalis =

Scientific classification
- Kingdom: Animalia
- Phylum: Arthropoda
- Class: Insecta
- Order: Lepidoptera
- Family: Crambidae
- Genus: Pyrausta
- Species: P. subfuscalis

Binomial name
- Pyrausta subfuscalis Caradja in Caradja & Meyrick, 1933

Species of moth

Pyrausta subfuscalis is a moth in the family Crambidae. It was described by Aristide Caradja in 1933. It is found in Guangdong, China.
