= Eupithecia amicula =

Scientific classification
- Kingdom: Animalia
- Phylum: Arthropoda
- Clade: Pancrustacea
- Class: Insecta
- Order: Lepidoptera
- Family: Geometridae
- Genus: Eupithecia
- Species: E. amicula

Binomial name
- Eupithecia amicula Mironov & Galsworthy, 2005

Species of moth

Eupithecia amicula is a moth in the family Geometridae first described by Vladimir G. Mironov and Anthony Charles Galsworthy in 2005. It is found in south-western and western Chinese provinces of Sichuan, Yunnan and Shaanxi.

The wingspan is about 18–20 mm.
