= Catocala borthi =

Scientific classification
- Kingdom: Animalia
- Phylum: Arthropoda
- Clade: Pancrustacea
- Class: Insecta
- Order: Lepidoptera
- Superfamily: Noctuoidea
- Family: Erebidae
- Genus: Catocala
- Species: C. borthi

Binomial name
- Catocala borthi Saldaitis, Ivinskis, Floriani & Babics, 2012

Species of moth

Catocala borthi is a moth in the family Erebidae. It is found in China (Sichuan).
