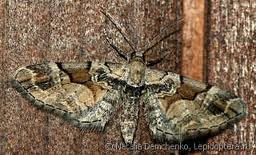

Scientific classification
- Kingdom: Animalia
- Phylum: Arthropoda
- Clade: Pancrustacea
- Class: Insecta
- Order: Lepidoptera
- Family: Geometridae
- Genus: Eupithecia
- Species: E. verecunda

Binomial name
- Eupithecia verecunda Vojnits, 1980

= Eupithecia verecunda =

Species of moth

Eupithecia verecunda is a moth in the family Geometridae. It is found in China (Shensi).
