= Pyrausta obscurior =

Scientific classification
- Domain: Eukaryota
- Kingdom: Animalia
- Phylum: Arthropoda
- Class: Insecta
- Order: Lepidoptera
- Family: Crambidae
- Genus: Pyrausta
- Species: P. obscurior

Binomial name
- Pyrausta obscurior Caradja, 1938

Species of insect

Pyrausta obscurior is a moth in the family Crambidae. It was described by Aristide Caradja in 1938. It is found in Yunnan, China.
