= Scopula polyterpes =

Scientific classification
- Kingdom: Animalia
- Phylum: Arthropoda
- Clade: Pancrustacea
- Class: Insecta
- Order: Lepidoptera
- Family: Geometridae
- Genus: Scopula
- Species: S. polyterpes

Binomial name
- Scopula polyterpes Prout, 1920

Species of geometer moth in subfamily Sterrhinae

Scopula polyterpes is a moth of the family Geometridae, which is found in China (including Hainan).
