= Pyrausta genialis =

Scientific classification
- Domain: Eukaryota
- Kingdom: Animalia
- Phylum: Arthropoda
- Class: Insecta
- Order: Lepidoptera
- Family: Crambidae
- Genus: Pyrausta
- Species: P. genialis

Binomial name
- Pyrausta genialis South in Leech & South, 1901

Species of moth

Pyrausta genialis is a moth in the family Crambidae. It was described by South in 1901. It is found in China.

== Subspecies ==
- Pyrausta genialis genialis
- Pyrausta genialis reductalis Caradja in Caradja & Meyrick, 1937 (China: Yunnan)
