= Eupithecia camilla =

Scientific classification
- Kingdom: Animalia
- Phylum: Arthropoda
- Clade: Pancrustacea
- Class: Insecta
- Order: Lepidoptera
- Family: Geometridae
- Genus: Eupithecia
- Species: E. camilla

Binomial name
- Eupithecia camilla Mironov & Galsworthy, 2004

Species of moth

Eupithecia camilla is a moth in the family Geometridae. It is found in Shaanxi in central China.

The wingspan is about 19–20 mm.
