= Eupithecia coribalteata =

Scientific classification
- Kingdom: Animalia
- Phylum: Arthropoda
- Clade: Pancrustacea
- Class: Insecta
- Order: Lepidoptera
- Family: Geometridae
- Genus: Eupithecia
- Species: E. coribalteata

Binomial name
- Eupithecia coribalteata Mironov & Galsworthy, 2004

Species of moth

Eupithecia coribalteata is a moth in the family Geometridae. It is known from Qinghai and Gansu in western China.

The wingspan is about 19–21 mm for females.
