= Eupithecia apta =

Scientific classification
- Kingdom: Animalia
- Phylum: Arthropoda
- Clade: Pancrustacea
- Class: Insecta
- Order: Lepidoptera
- Family: Geometridae
- Genus: Eupithecia
- Species: E. apta

Binomial name
- Eupithecia apta Mironov & Galsworthy, 2004

Species of moth

Eupithecia apta is a moth in the family Geometridae. It is found in south-western China (Yunnan).

The wingspan is about 17.5 mm.
