= Eupithecia svetlanae =

Scientific classification
- Kingdom: Animalia
- Phylum: Arthropoda
- Clade: Pancrustacea
- Class: Insecta
- Order: Lepidoptera
- Family: Geometridae
- Genus: Eupithecia
- Species: E. svetlanae

Binomial name
- Eupithecia svetlanae Pekarsky & Mironov, 2011

Species of moth

Eupithecia svetlanae is a moth in the family Geometridae. It is found in Sichuan, China. It is named for Svetlana Pekarsky, the wife of one of the authors.

The wingspan is 17 mm (0.67 in) for the holotype, a male.
