= Ambulyx pseudoregia =

Scientific classification
- Kingdom: Animalia
- Phylum: Arthropoda
- Class: Insecta
- Order: Lepidoptera
- Family: Sphingidae
- Genus: Ambulyx
- Species: A. pseudoregia

Binomial name
- Ambulyx pseudoregia Eitschberger & Bergmann, 2006

Species of moth

Ambulyx pseudoregia is a species of moth of the family Sphingidae. It is known from China (Sichuan).
