= Eupithecia nirvana =

Scientific classification
- Kingdom: Animalia
- Phylum: Arthropoda
- Clade: Pancrustacea
- Class: Insecta
- Order: Lepidoptera
- Family: Geometridae
- Genus: Eupithecia
- Species: E. nirvana

Binomial name
- Eupithecia nirvana Mironov & Galsworthy, 2006

Species of moth

Eupithecia nirvana is a moth in the family Geometridae. It is endemic to Southwestern China (Sichuan).

The wingspan is about 21.5–25 mm (0.85–0.98 in).
