= Coleophora dangchuanica =

Scientific classification
- Kingdom: Animalia
- Phylum: Arthropoda
- Class: Insecta
- Order: Lepidoptera
- Family: Coleophoridae
- Genus: Coleophora
- Species: C. dangchuanica

Binomial name
- Coleophora dangchuanica H.H. Li, 2004

Species of moth

Coleophora dangchuanica is a moth of the family Coleophoridae. It is found in Gansu, China.
