= Eupithecia matrona =

Scientific classification
- Kingdom: Animalia
- Phylum: Arthropoda
- Clade: Pancrustacea
- Class: Insecta
- Order: Lepidoptera
- Family: Geometridae
- Genus: Eupithecia
- Species: E. matrona

Binomial name
- Eupithecia matrona Mironov & Galsworthy, 2004

Species of moth

Eupithecia matrona is a moth in the family Geometridae. It is found in Gansu and Qinghai, western China.

The wingspan is about 24–25 mm for males.
