= Catocala kasenko =

Scientific classification
- Kingdom: Animalia
- Phylum: Arthropoda
- Class: Insecta
- Order: Lepidoptera
- Superfamily: Noctuoidea
- Family: Erebidae
- Genus: Catocala
- Species: C. kasenko

Binomial name
- Catocala kasenko Ishizuka, 2007

Species of moth

Catocala kasenko is a moth in the family Erebidae. It is found in China (Sichuan).
