= Eupithecia antiqua =

Scientific classification
- Kingdom: Animalia
- Phylum: Arthropoda
- Clade: Pancrustacea
- Class: Insecta
- Order: Lepidoptera
- Family: Geometridae
- Genus: Eupithecia
- Species: E. antiqua

Binomial name
- Eupithecia antiqua Mironov & Galsworthy, 2004

Species of moth

Eupithecia antiqua is a moth in the family Geometridae. It is found in south-western China (Yunnan).

The wingspan is about 21 mm. The forewings are grey with dark brown markings and the hindwings are dirty white.
