= Eupithecia tamara =

Scientific classification
- Kingdom: Animalia
- Phylum: Arthropoda
- Clade: Pancrustacea
- Class: Insecta
- Order: Lepidoptera
- Family: Geometridae
- Genus: Eupithecia
- Species: E. tamara

Binomial name
- Eupithecia tamara Mironov & Pekarsky, 2011

Species of moth

Eupithecia tamara is a moth in the family Geometridae. It is found in Sichuan, China. It is named for Tamara Mironova, the mother of one of the authors.

The wingspan is about 20.5 mm (0.81 in).
