= Eupithecia adoranda =

Scientific classification
- Kingdom: Animalia
- Phylum: Arthropoda
- Clade: Pancrustacea
- Class: Insecta
- Order: Lepidoptera
- Family: Geometridae
- Genus: Eupithecia
- Species: E. adoranda

Binomial name
- Eupithecia adoranda Vojnits, 1984

Species of moth

Eupithecia adoranda is a moth in the family Geometridae. It is found in China.
