= Catocala seiohbo =

Scientific classification
- Domain: Eukaryota
- Kingdom: Animalia
- Phylum: Arthropoda
- Class: Insecta
- Order: Lepidoptera
- Superfamily: Noctuoidea
- Family: Erebidae
- Genus: Catocala
- Species: C. seiohbo

Binomial name
- Catocala seiohbo Ishizuka, 2002

Species of moth

Catocala seiohbo is a moth of the family Erebidae first described by Katsumi Ishizuka in 2002. It is found in the Chinese provinces of Sichuan, Guangxi, Guangdong and Hunan.

The wingspan is about 67 mm.
