= Ambulyx amara =

Scientific classification
- Kingdom: Animalia
- Phylum: Arthropoda
- Class: Insecta
- Order: Lepidoptera
- Family: Sphingidae
- Genus: Ambulyx
- Species: A. amara

Binomial name
- Ambulyx amara Eitschberger, Bergmann & Hauenstein, 2006

Species of moth

Ambulyx amara is a species of moth in the family Sphingidae. It was described by Ulf Eitschberger, Andreas Bergmann and Armin Hauenstein in 2006. It is known from Guangdong in China.
