= Eupithecia larentimima =

Scientific classification
- Kingdom: Animalia
- Phylum: Arthropoda
- Clade: Pancrustacea
- Class: Insecta
- Order: Lepidoptera
- Family: Geometridae
- Genus: Eupithecia
- Species: E. larentimima

Binomial name
- Eupithecia larentimima Vojnits, 1974

Species of moth

Eupithecia larentimima is a moth in the family Geometridae. It is found in Zhejiang Province, China.
