= Eupithecia primitiva =

Scientific classification
- Kingdom: Animalia
- Phylum: Arthropoda
- Clade: Pancrustacea
- Class: Insecta
- Order: Lepidoptera
- Family: Geometridae
- Genus: Eupithecia
- Species: E. primitiva

Binomial name
- Eupithecia primitiva Mironov & Galsworthy, 2004

Species of moth

Eupithecia primitiva is a moth in the family Geometridae. It is found in Gansu, western China.

The wingspan is about 18 mm (0.71 in) for males.
