= Eupithecia missionerata =

Scientific classification
- Kingdom: Animalia
- Phylum: Arthropoda
- Clade: Pancrustacea
- Class: Insecta
- Order: Lepidoptera
- Family: Geometridae
- Genus: Eupithecia
- Species: E. missionerata

Binomial name
- Eupithecia missionerata Mironov & Galsworthy, 2011

Species of moth

Eupithecia missionerata is a moth in the family Geometridae. It is found in Tibet, China.

The wingspan is about 19.5 mm (0.77 in) for males.
