= Eupithecia chingana =

Scientific classification
- Domain: Eukaryota
- Kingdom: Animalia
- Phylum: Arthropoda
- Class: Insecta
- Order: Lepidoptera
- Family: Geometridae
- Genus: Eupithecia
- Species: E. chingana

Binomial name
- Eupithecia chingana (Wehrli, 1927)

Synonyms
- Chloroclystis chingana Wehrli, 1927; Pasiphila chingana; Horisme sternecki Prout, 1938

Species of moth

Eupithecia chingana is a moth in the family Geometridae. It is found in China.
