= Eupithecia ensifera =

Scientific classification
- Kingdom: Animalia
- Phylum: Arthropoda
- Clade: Pancrustacea
- Class: Insecta
- Order: Lepidoptera
- Family: Geometridae
- Genus: Eupithecia
- Species: E. ensifera

Binomial name
- Eupithecia ensifera Mironov & Galsworthy, 2004

Species of moth

Eupithecia ensifera is a moth in the family Geometridae. It is found in Qinghai, western China.

The wingspan is about 22 mm.
