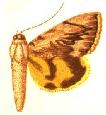

Scientific classification
- Kingdom: Animalia
- Phylum: Arthropoda
- Class: Insecta
- Order: Lepidoptera
- Superfamily: Noctuoidea
- Family: Erebidae
- Genus: Catocala
- Species: C. aestimabilis

Binomial name
- Catocala aestimabilis Staudinger, 1892

Synonyms
- Ephesia aestimabilis

= Catocala aestimabilis =

Species of moth

Catocala aestimabilis is a moth of the family Erebidae. It is found in Xinjiang, China.
