= Asura griseata =

Scientific classification
- Domain: Eukaryota
- Kingdom: Animalia
- Phylum: Arthropoda
- Class: Insecta
- Order: Lepidoptera
- Superfamily: Noctuoidea
- Family: Erebidae
- Subfamily: Arctiinae
- Genus: Asura
- Species: A. griseata

Binomial name
- Asura griseata (Leech, 1899)

Synonyms
- Setina griseata Leech, 1899

Species of moth

Asura griseata is a moth of the family Erebidae. It is found in China.
