= Eupithecia boneta =

Scientific classification
- Kingdom: Animalia
- Phylum: Arthropoda
- Clade: Pancrustacea
- Class: Insecta
- Order: Lepidoptera
- Family: Geometridae
- Genus: Eupithecia
- Species: E. boneta

Binomial name
- Eupithecia boneta Mironov & Galsworthy, 2011

Species of moth

Eupithecia boneta is a moth in the family Geometridae. It is found in Yunnan, China.

The wingspan is about 16 mm (0.63 in) for females.
