= Eupithecia manifesta =

Scientific classification
- Kingdom: Animalia
- Phylum: Arthropoda
- Clade: Pancrustacea
- Class: Insecta
- Order: Lepidoptera
- Family: Geometridae
- Genus: Eupithecia
- Species: E. manifesta

Binomial name
- Eupithecia manifesta Mironov & Galsworthy, 2011

Species of moth

Eupithecia manifesta is a moth in the family Geometridae. It is found in Yunnan, China.

The wingspan is about 16–17.5 mm (0.63–0.69 in) for females.
