= Eupithecia aenigma =

Scientific classification
- Kingdom: Animalia
- Phylum: Arthropoda
- Clade: Pancrustacea
- Class: Insecta
- Order: Lepidoptera
- Family: Geometridae
- Genus: Eupithecia
- Species: E. aenigma

Binomial name
- Eupithecia aenigma Mironov & Galsworthy, 2004

Species of moth

Eupithecia aenigma is a moth in the family Geometridae. It is known from Yunnan and eastern Tibet in south-western China.

The wingspan is about 14 mm. The fore- and hindwings are pale warm brown.
