= Coleophora carchara =

Scientific classification
- Kingdom: Animalia
- Phylum: Arthropoda
- Class: Insecta
- Order: Lepidoptera
- Family: Coleophoridae
- Genus: Coleophora
- Species: C. carchara

Binomial name
- Coleophora carchara Falkovitsh, 1972

Species of moth

Coleophora carchara is a moth of the family Coleophoridae. It is found in China and Mongolia.
