= Catocala uljanae =

Scientific classification
- Kingdom: Animalia
- Phylum: Arthropoda
- Clade: Pancrustacea
- Class: Insecta
- Order: Lepidoptera
- Superfamily: Noctuoidea
- Family: Erebidae
- Genus: Catocala
- Species: C. uljanae

Binomial name
- Catocala uljanae Sinyaev, Saldaitis & Ivinskis, 2007

Species of moth

Catocala uljanae is a moth in the family Erebidae. It is known from Sichuan, China, where it was collected in a mixed Quercus–Pinaceae forest.

The wingspan is 78 mm (3.1 in). It is one of the few Catocala species with plain hindwings.
