= Eupithecia omissa =

Scientific classification
- Kingdom: Animalia
- Phylum: Arthropoda
- Clade: Pancrustacea
- Class: Insecta
- Order: Lepidoptera
- Family: Geometridae
- Genus: Eupithecia
- Species: E. omissa

Binomial name
- Eupithecia omissa Mironov & Galsworthy, 2004

Species of moth

Eupithecia omissa is a moth in the family Geometridae. It is found in north-western China in Shaanxi and Gansu provinces.

The wingspan is about 18–20 mm.
