= Eupithecia hebes =

Scientific classification
- Kingdom: Animalia
- Phylum: Arthropoda
- Clade: Pancrustacea
- Class: Insecta
- Order: Lepidoptera
- Family: Geometridae
- Genus: Eupithecia
- Species: E. hebes

Binomial name
- Eupithecia hebes Mironov & Galsworthy, 2004

Species of moth

Eupithecia hebes is a moth in the family Geometridae. It is found in Shanxi in northern China.

The wingspan is about 17 mm.
