= Pyrausta splendida =

Scientific classification
- Domain: Eukaryota
- Kingdom: Animalia
- Phylum: Arthropoda
- Class: Insecta
- Order: Lepidoptera
- Family: Crambidae
- Genus: Pyrausta
- Species: P. splendida

Binomial name
- Pyrausta splendida Caradja, 1938

Species of moth

Pyrausta splendida is a moth in the family Crambidae. It was described by Aristide Caradja in 1938. It is found in Yunnan, China.
