= Catocala svetlana =

Scientific classification
- Kingdom: Animalia
- Phylum: Arthropoda
- Class: Insecta
- Order: Lepidoptera
- Superfamily: Noctuoidea
- Family: Erebidae
- Genus: Catocala
- Species: C. svetlana

Binomial name
- Catocala svetlana Sviridov, 1997

Species of moth

Catocala svetlana is a moth in the family Erebidae. It is found in China (Fujian).
