= Eupithecia eurytera =

Scientific classification
- Kingdom: Animalia
- Phylum: Arthropoda
- Clade: Pancrustacea
- Class: Insecta
- Order: Lepidoptera
- Family: Geometridae
- Genus: Eupithecia
- Species: E. eurytera

Binomial name
- Eupithecia eurytera (Prout, 1938)

Synonyms
- Horisme eurytera Prout, 1938

Species of moth

Eupithecia eurytera is a moth in the family Geometridae. It is found in China.
