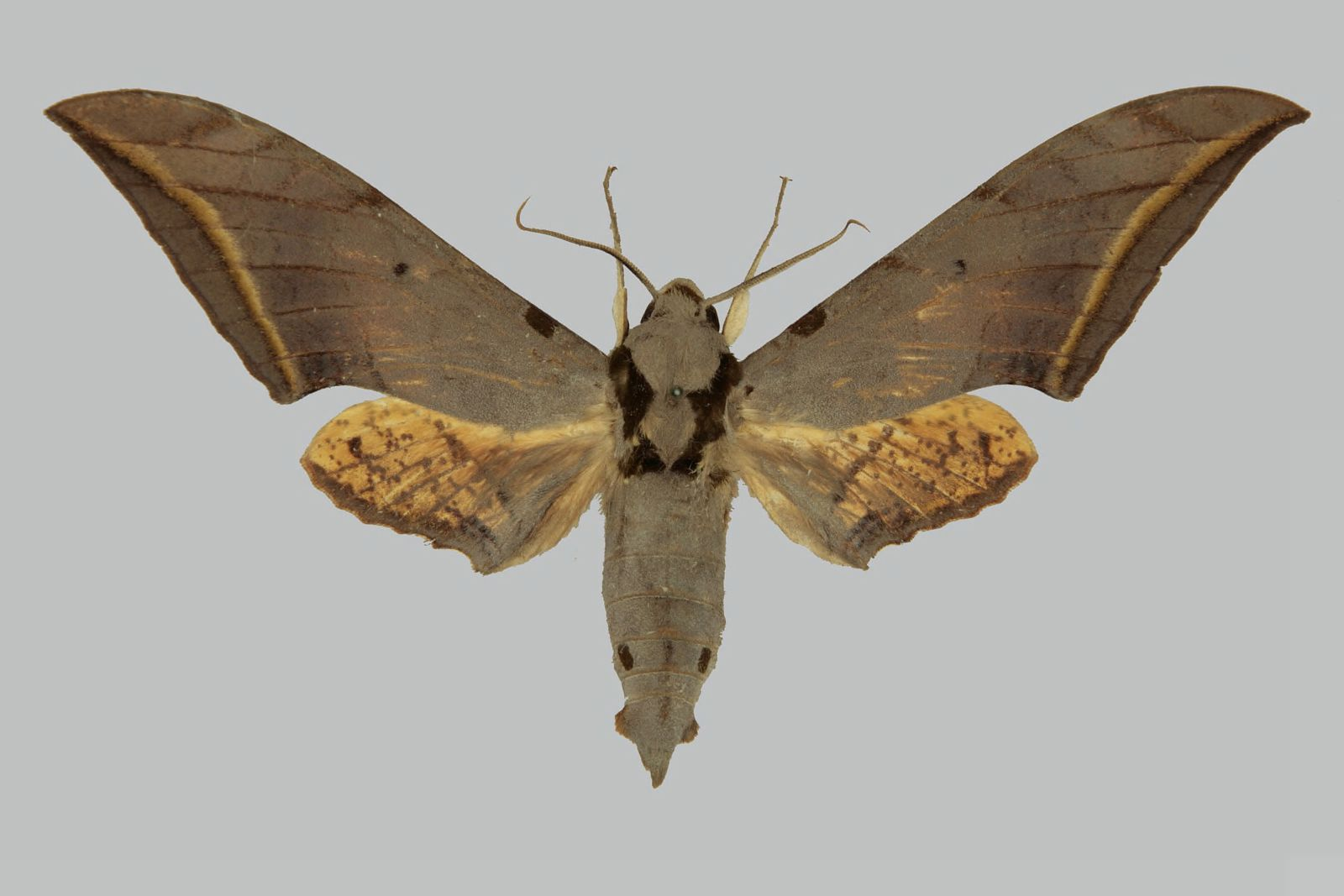
- Male

Scientific classification
- Kingdom: Animalia
- Phylum: Arthropoda
- Class: Insecta
- Order: Lepidoptera
- Family: Sphingidae
- Genus: Ambulyx
- Species: A. interplacida

Binomial name
- Ambulyx interplacida Brechlin, 2006

= Ambulyx interplacida =

Species of moth

Ambulyx interplacida is a species of moth of the family Sphingidae first described by Ronald Brechlin in 2006. It is known from the south-eastern Chinese provinces of Jiangxi and Hunan.

The wingspan is 112–120 mm.
