= Eupithecia delicata =

Scientific classification
- Kingdom: Animalia
- Phylum: Arthropoda
- Clade: Pancrustacea
- Class: Insecta
- Order: Lepidoptera
- Family: Geometridae
- Genus: Eupithecia
- Species: E. delicata

Binomial name
- Eupithecia delicata Mironov & Galsworthy, 2004

Species of moth

Eupithecia delicata is a moth in the family Geometridae. It is found in Sichuan in south-western China.

The wingspan is about 20–23 mm.
