= Eupithecia cordata =

Scientific classification
- Kingdom: Animalia
- Phylum: Arthropoda
- Clade: Pancrustacea
- Class: Insecta
- Order: Lepidoptera
- Family: Geometridae
- Genus: Eupithecia
- Species: E. cordata

Binomial name
- Eupithecia cordata Mironov & Galsworthy, 2004

Species of moth

Eupithecia cordata is a moth in the family Geometridae. It is known from Yunnan in south-western China.

The wingspan is about 16–17 mm. The fore- and hindwings are pale buff-brown.
