= Eupithecia albimedia =

Scientific classification
- Kingdom: Animalia
- Phylum: Arthropoda
- Clade: Pancrustacea
- Class: Insecta
- Order: Lepidoptera
- Family: Geometridae
- Genus: Eupithecia
- Species: E. albimedia

Binomial name
- Eupithecia albimedia Mironov & Galsworthy, 2005

Species of moth

Eupithecia albimedia is a moth in the family Geometridae. It is found in south-western China (Sichuan, Yunnan).

The wingspan is about 18–21 mm.
