= Eupithecia burselongata =

Scientific classification
- Kingdom: Animalia
- Phylum: Arthropoda
- Clade: Pancrustacea
- Class: Insecta
- Order: Lepidoptera
- Family: Geometridae
- Genus: Eupithecia
- Species: E. burselongata

Binomial name
- Eupithecia burselongata Mironov & Galsworthy, 2004

Species of moth

Eupithecia burselongata is a moth in the family Geometridae. It is known from Yunnan (south-western China). The type series was collected in 1936 at elevations of about 4,000–4,500 m (13,100–14,800 ft) above sea level.

The wingspan is about 18–22 mm.
