= Coleophora xinjiangensis =

Scientific classification
- Kingdom: Animalia
- Phylum: Arthropoda
- Class: Insecta
- Order: Lepidoptera
- Family: Coleophoridae
- Genus: Coleophora
- Species: C. xinjiangensis

Binomial name
- Coleophora xinjiangensis Li & Zheng, 1998

Species of moth

Coleophora xinjiangensis is a moth of the family Coleophoridae. It is found in China.

The wingspan is 11–14 mm.
