= Eupithecia szelenyica =

Scientific classification
- Kingdom: Animalia
- Phylum: Arthropoda
- Clade: Pancrustacea
- Class: Insecta
- Order: Lepidoptera
- Family: Geometridae
- Genus: Eupithecia
- Species: E. szelenyica

Binomial name
- Eupithecia szelenyica Vojnits & Laever, 1974

Species of moth

Eupithecia szelenyica is a moth in the family Geometridae. It is found in China.
