= Coleophora falcipenella =

Scientific classification
- Kingdom: Animalia
- Phylum: Arthropoda
- Clade: Pancrustacea
- Class: Insecta
- Order: Lepidoptera
- Family: Coleophoridae
- Genus: Coleophora
- Species: C. falcipenella

Binomial name
- Coleophora falcipenella Baldizzone, 1989

Species of moth

Coleophora falcipenella, erroneously spelled Coleophora falcipennella, is a moth of the family Coleophoridae. It is found in Yunnan, China.

The wingspan is about 15 mm. The larval host plant is unknown.
