= Eupithecia sacrivicae =

Scientific classification
- Kingdom: Animalia
- Phylum: Arthropoda
- Clade: Pancrustacea
- Class: Insecta
- Order: Lepidoptera
- Family: Geometridae
- Genus: Eupithecia
- Species: E. sacrivicae

Binomial name
- Eupithecia sacrivicae Mironov & Galsworthy, 2004

Species of moth

Eupithecia sacrivicae is a moth in the family Geometridae. It is known from Hubei and Shaanxi provinces in central and north-western China.

The wingspan is about 19–20 mm.
