= Pyrausta szetschwanalis =

Scientific classification
- Domain: Eukaryota
- Kingdom: Animalia
- Phylum: Arthropoda
- Class: Insecta
- Order: Lepidoptera
- Family: Crambidae
- Genus: Pyrausta
- Species: P. szetschwanalis

Binomial name
- Pyrausta szetschwanalis Caradja, 1927

Species of moth

Pyrausta szetschwanalis is a moth in the family Crambidae. It was described by Aristide Caradja in 1927. It is found in Sichuan, China.
