= Catocala infasciata =

Scientific classification
- Kingdom: Animalia
- Phylum: Arthropoda
- Class: Insecta
- Order: Lepidoptera
- Superfamily: Noctuoidea
- Family: Erebidae
- Genus: Catocala
- Species: C. infasciata

Binomial name
- Catocala infasciata (Mell, 1936)

Synonyms
- Ephesia infasciata Mell, 1936

Species of moth

Catocala infasciata is a moth in the family Erebidae first described by Rudolf Mell in 1936. It is found in Yunnan, China.
