= Eupithecia turpis =

Scientific classification
- Kingdom: Animalia
- Phylum: Arthropoda
- Clade: Pancrustacea
- Class: Insecta
- Order: Lepidoptera
- Family: Geometridae
- Genus: Eupithecia
- Species: E. turpis

Binomial name
- Eupithecia turpis Vojnits, 1981

Species of moth

Eupithecia turpis is a moth in the family Geometridae. It is found in China (Yunnan).
