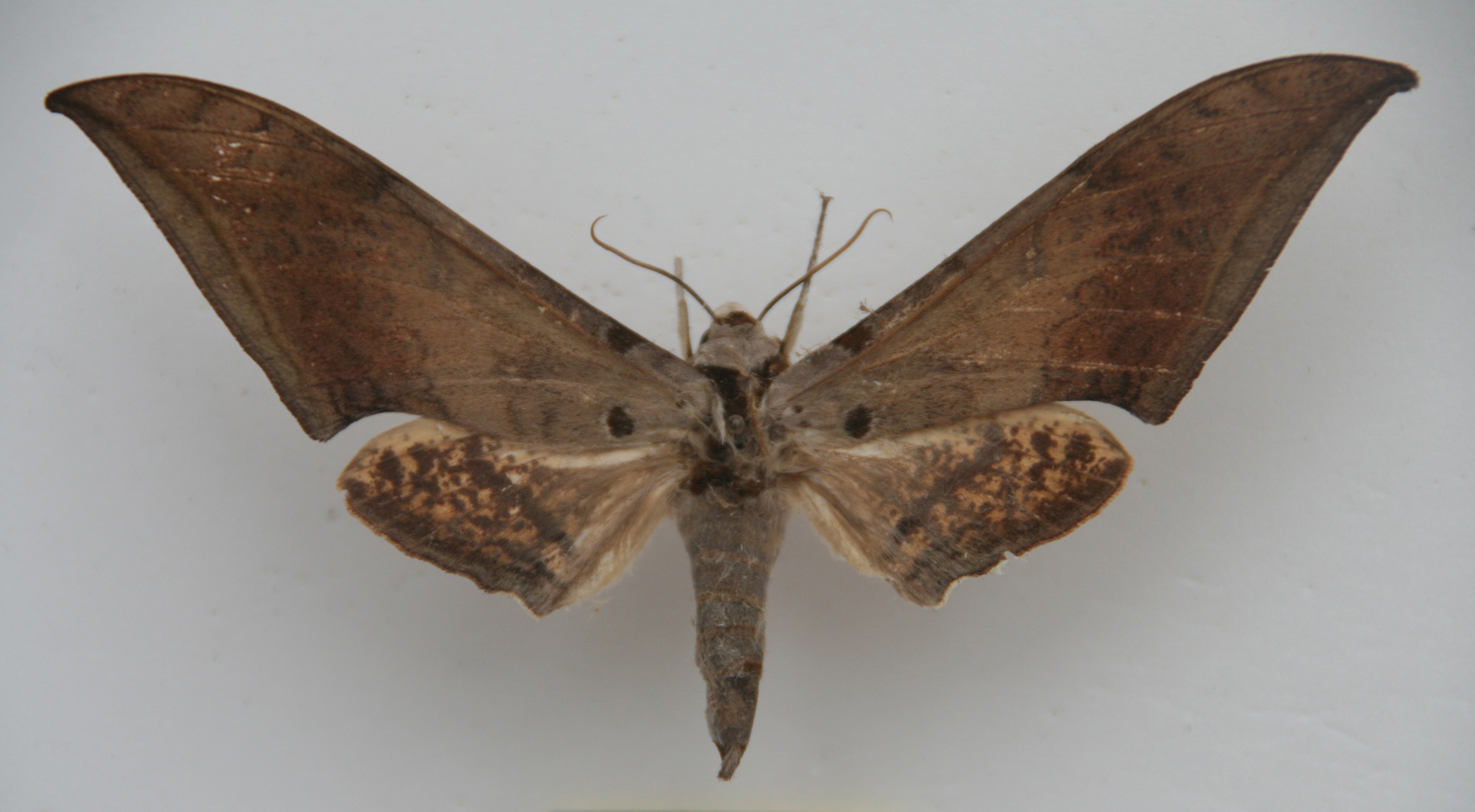

Scientific classification
- Kingdom: Animalia
- Phylum: Arthropoda
- Class: Insecta
- Order: Lepidoptera
- Family: Sphingidae
- Genus: Ambulyx
- Species: A. zhejiangensis

Binomial name
- Ambulyx zhejiangensis Brechlin, 2009

= Ambulyx zhejiangensis =

Species of moth

Ambulyx zhejiangensis is a species of moth of the family Sphingidae. It is known from eastern China.
