= Eupithecia puella =

Scientific classification
- Kingdom: Animalia
- Phylum: Arthropoda
- Clade: Pancrustacea
- Class: Insecta
- Order: Lepidoptera
- Family: Geometridae
- Genus: Eupithecia
- Species: E. puella

Binomial name
- Eupithecia puella Mironov & Galsworthy, 2004

Species of moth

Eupithecia puella is a moth in the family Geometridae. It is found in Yunnan, south-western China.

The wingspan is about 19 mm.
