= Eupithecia atuni =

Scientific classification
- Kingdom: Animalia
- Phylum: Arthropoda
- Clade: Pancrustacea
- Class: Insecta
- Order: Lepidoptera
- Family: Geometridae
- Genus: Eupithecia
- Species: E. atuni

Binomial name
- Eupithecia atuni Mironov & Galsworthy, 2006

Species of moth

Eupithecia atuni is a moth in the family Geometridae. It is endemic to Southwestern China (Yunnan).

The wingspan is about 19–22 mm (0.75–0.87 in).
