= Catocala maso =

Scientific classification
- Kingdom: Animalia
- Phylum: Arthropoda
- Class: Insecta
- Order: Lepidoptera
- Superfamily: Noctuoidea
- Family: Erebidae
- Genus: Catocala
- Species: C. maso

Binomial name
- Catocala maso Ishizuka, 2011

Species of moth

Catocala maso is a moth in the family Erebidae. It is found in China (Guangdong).
