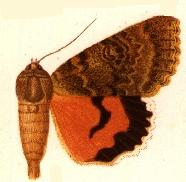

Scientific classification
- Kingdom: Animalia
- Phylum: Arthropoda
- Class: Insecta
- Order: Lepidoptera
- Superfamily: Noctuoidea
- Family: Erebidae
- Genus: Catocala
- Species: C. szechuena

Binomial name
- Catocala szechuena Hampson, 1913

= Catocala szechuena =

Species of moth

Catocala szechuena is a moth of the family Erebidae first described by George Hampson in 1913. It is found in western China.
