= Eupithecia chesiata =

Scientific classification
- Domain: Eukaryota
- Kingdom: Animalia
- Phylum: Arthropoda
- Class: Insecta
- Order: Lepidoptera
- Family: Geometridae
- Genus: Eupithecia
- Species: E. chesiata

Binomial name
- Eupithecia chesiata Dietze, 1904

Species of moth

Eupithecia chesiata is a moth in the family Geometridae. It is found in China (Xinjiang).
