= Eupithecia atrisignis =

Scientific classification
- Kingdom: Animalia
- Phylum: Arthropoda
- Class: Insecta
- Order: Lepidoptera
- Family: Geometridae
- Genus: Eupithecia
- Species: E. atrisignis

Binomial name
- Eupithecia atrisignis Butler, 1889

Synonyms
- Eupithecia circumacta Prout, 1958; Eupithecia forsteri Vojnits, 1983; Eupithecia profana Vojnits, 1984

Species of moth

Eupithecia atrisignis is a moth in the family Geometridae. It is found from the western Himalayas to south-western China.
