= Eupithecia ultrix =

Scientific classification
- Kingdom: Animalia
- Phylum: Arthropoda
- Clade: Pancrustacea
- Class: Insecta
- Order: Lepidoptera
- Family: Geometridae
- Genus: Eupithecia
- Species: E. ultrix

Binomial name
- Eupithecia ultrix Mironov & Galsworthy, 2004

Species of moth

Eupithecia ultrix is a moth in the family Geometridae. It is found in Sichuan and Yunnan, southwestern China.

The wingspan is about 22 mm. The fore- and hindwings are light brown.
