= Scopula manifesta =

Scientific classification
- Kingdom: Animalia
- Phylum: Arthropoda
- Clade: Pancrustacea
- Class: Insecta
- Order: Lepidoptera
- Family: Geometridae
- Genus: Scopula
- Species: S. manifesta

Binomial name
- Scopula manifesta (Prout, 1911)

Synonyms
- Acidalia manifesta Prout, 1911

Species of geometer moth in subfamily Sterrhinae

Scopula manifesta is a moth of the family Geometridae. It is found in northern China.
