= Catocala jyoka =

Scientific classification
- Kingdom: Animalia
- Phylum: Arthropoda
- Class: Insecta
- Order: Lepidoptera
- Superfamily: Noctuoidea
- Family: Erebidae
- Genus: Catocala
- Species: C. jyoka

Binomial name
- Catocala jyoka Ishizuka, 2006

Species of moth

Catocala jyoka is a moth in the family Erebidae. It is found in China in the province of Sichuan.
