= List of moths of Nepal (Drepanidae) =

The following is a list of Drepanidae of Nepal. Sixty different species are listed.

This list is primarily based on Colin Smith's 2010 "Lepidoptera of Nepal", which is based on Toshiro Haruta's "Moths of Nepal (Vol. 1-6)" with some recent additions and a modernized classification.

- Agnidra discipilaria
- Agnidra specularia
- Agnidra vinacea
- Amphitorna olga
- Auzata semipavonaria
- Callidrepana argenteola
- Callidrepana patrana patrana
- Canucha duplexa duplexa
- Canucha specularis
- Deroca hidda bifida
- Deroca hyalina hyalina
- Deroca inconclusa
- Ditrigona diana
- Ditrigona furvicosta
- Ditrigona media
- Ditrigona mytylata
- Ditrigona obliquilinea obliquilinea
- Ditrigona regularis
- Ditrigona sericea
- Ditrigona spatulata
- Ditrigona triangularia
- Drapetodes mitaria
- Drepana dispilata dispilata
- Drepana hyalina
- Drepana innotata
- Drepana pallida pallida
- Drepana rufofasciata
- Auzatellodes hyalinata
- Macrauzata fenestraria
- Macrocilix mysticata mysticata
- Macrocilix orbiferata orbiferata
- Microblepsis leucosticta
- Microblepsis prunicolor
- Microblepsis violacea
- Nordstromia argenticeps
- Nordstromia bicostata bicostata
- Nordstromia lilacina
- Nordstromia vira
- Oreta ancora
- Oreta andreme
- Oreta extensa
- Oreta griseotincta griseotincta
- Oreta obtusa obtusa
- Oreta pavaca
- Oreta sanguinea
- Oreta vatama
- Oreta vatama luculenta
- Paralbara muscularia
- Strepsigonia diluta
- Teldenia vestigata
- Thymistadopsis trilinearia
- Thymistadopsis undulifera
- Thymistida tripunctata
- Tridrepana adelpha
- Tridrepana albonotata
- Tridrepana astralaine
- Tridrepana clinata
- Tridrepana flava flava
- Tridrepana fulva
- Tridrepana rubromarginata indica
- Tridrepana sadana

== See also ==
- List of butterflies of Nepal
- Odonata of Nepal
- Cerambycidae of Nepal
- Zygaenidae of Nepal
- Wildlife of Nepal
