= Ditrigona pruinosa =

Scientific classification
- Domain: Eukaryota
- Kingdom: Animalia
- Phylum: Arthropoda
- Class: Insecta
- Order: Lepidoptera
- Family: Drepanidae
- Genus: Ditrigona
- Species: D. pruinosa

Binomial name
- Ditrigona pruinosa (Moore, 1888)

Synonyms
- Thaleridia pruinosa Moore, 1888

Species of hook-tip moth

Ditrigona pruinosa is a moth in the family Drepanidae. It was described by Frederic Moore in 1888. It is found in Darjeeling, India. The Global Lepidoptera Names Index lists it as a synonym of Ditrigona quinaria.

The wingspan is about 15.5 mm.
