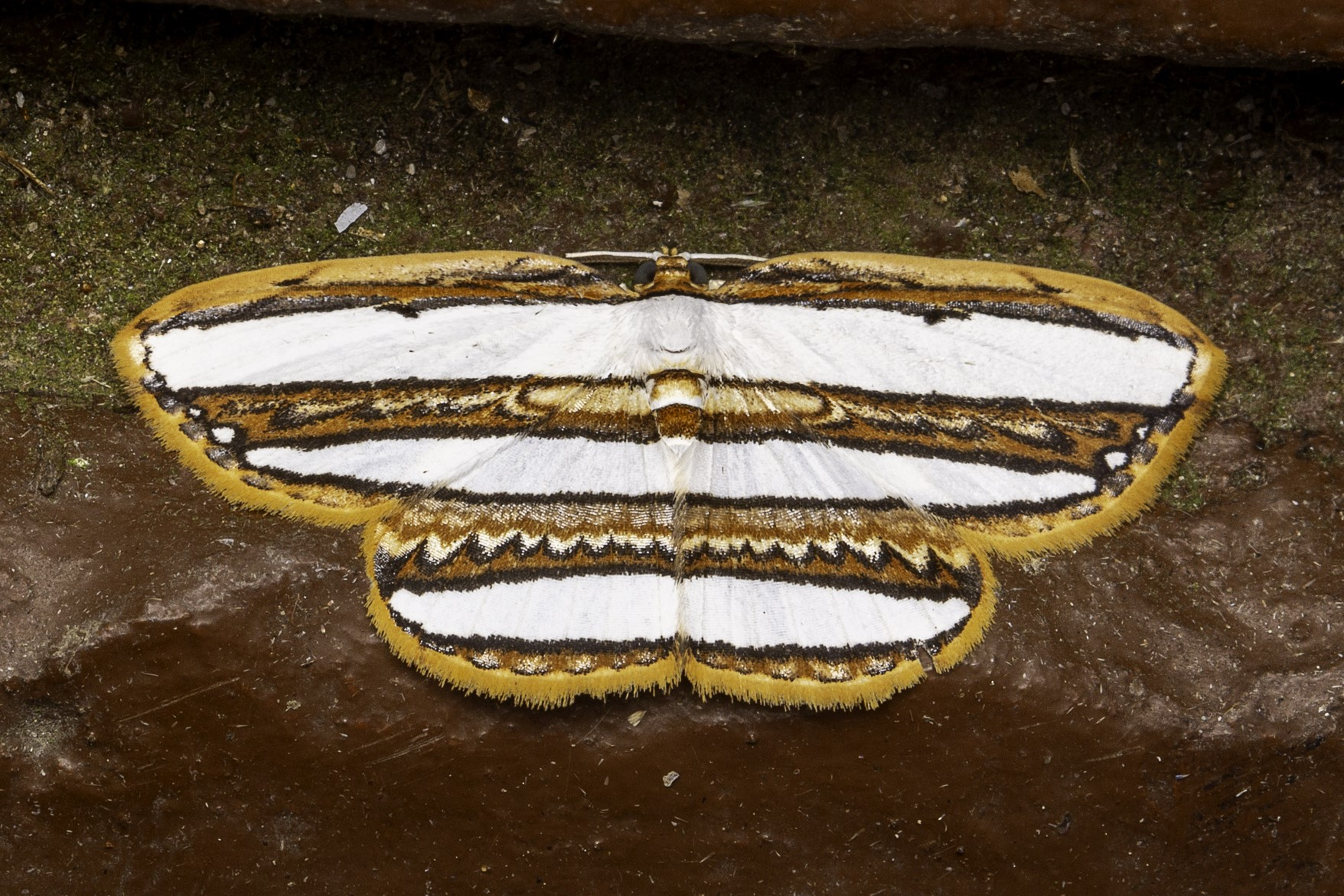

Scientific classification
- Kingdom: Animalia
- Phylum: Arthropoda
- Clade: Pancrustacea
- Class: Insecta
- Order: Lepidoptera
- Family: Drepanidae
- Genus: Drapetodes
- Species: D. matulata

Binomial name
- Drapetodes matulata Felder & Rogenhofer, 1874

Synonyms
- Drapetodes obliquifasciata Swinhoe, 1902

= Drapetodes matulata =

Species of hook-tip moth

Drapetodes matulata is a species of moth in the family Drepanidae. It was first described by Felder and Rogenhofer in 1874. It is found on Java, Peninsular Malaysia, Borneo and in Assam, India.

== Description ==
The wings are white with broad pinkish-ochreous stripes that on the costa are edged inwardly, the other two edged on both sides with chestnut-red lines. The first band is found along the costa of the forewings, the second from the abdominal margin of hindwings close to the base, to the outer margin of forewings above the middle. The third runs across the centre of the hindwings from the abdominal margin below the middle to the costa before the apex. All these stripes are parallel to each other and are perfectly straight and even; the second stripe has two white spots at its extremity on the outer margin of the wing and a more or less distinguishable white band running inside it. The third stripe has a more distinct white band which is dentate and edged on its lower side with brown. The outer margin of both wings has a band coloured like the stripes edged inwardly with a crenelate (scalloped) chestnut-red band.
