= Canucha bouvieri =

Scientific classification
- Domain: Eukaryota
- Kingdom: Animalia
- Phylum: Arthropoda
- Class: Insecta
- Order: Lepidoptera
- Family: Drepanidae
- Genus: Canucha
- Species: C. bouvieri

Binomial name
- Canucha bouvieri Oberthür, 1916

Synonyms
- Drepana bouvieri

Species of hook-tip moth

Canucha bouvieri is a moth in the family Drepanidae. It was described by Charles Oberthür in 1916. It is found in Sichuan, China.
