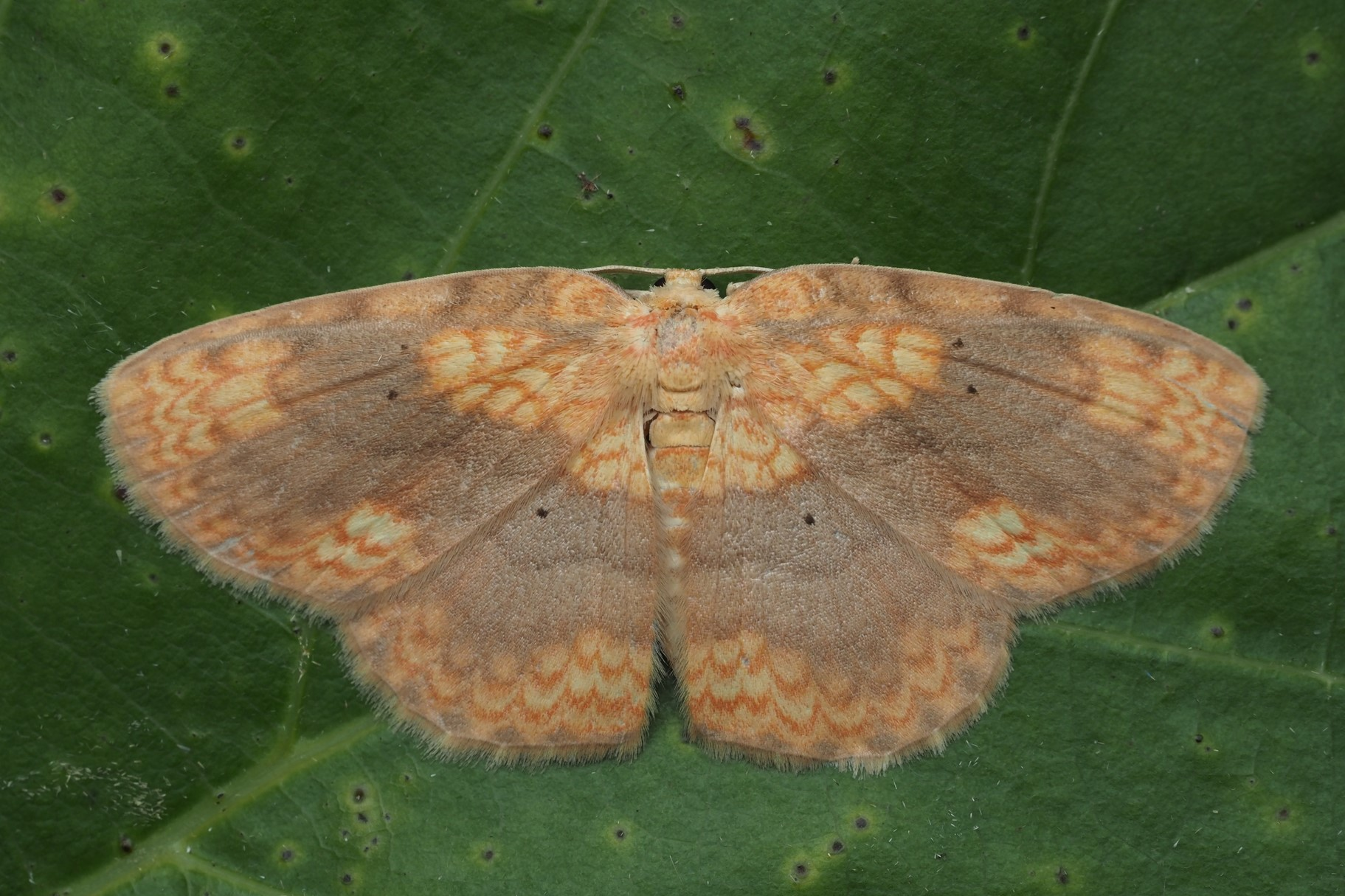

Scientific classification
- Kingdom: Animalia
- Phylum: Arthropoda
- Clade: Pancrustacea
- Class: Insecta
- Order: Lepidoptera
- Family: Drepanidae
- Genus: Drapetodes
- Species: D. croceago

Binomial name
- Drapetodes croceago Hampson, 1895

= Drapetodes croceago =

Species of hook-tip moth

Drapetodes croceago is a species of moth in the family Drepanidae. It was first described by George Hampson in 1895. It is found in southern Myanmar, Peninsular Malaysia and Borneo.

== Description ==
The wingspan is about 30 mm. Adults are bright orange yellow, the forewings with orange veins and four slightly waved orange lines before the middle. The disc is clouded with fuscous and there are two black spots at the end of the cell, as well as two curved postmedial orange lines and two dentate submarginal lines. The hindwings have the disc clouded with fuscous and there is a black speck at the end of the cell. There are also a medial, postmedial and two crenulate submarginal lines.
