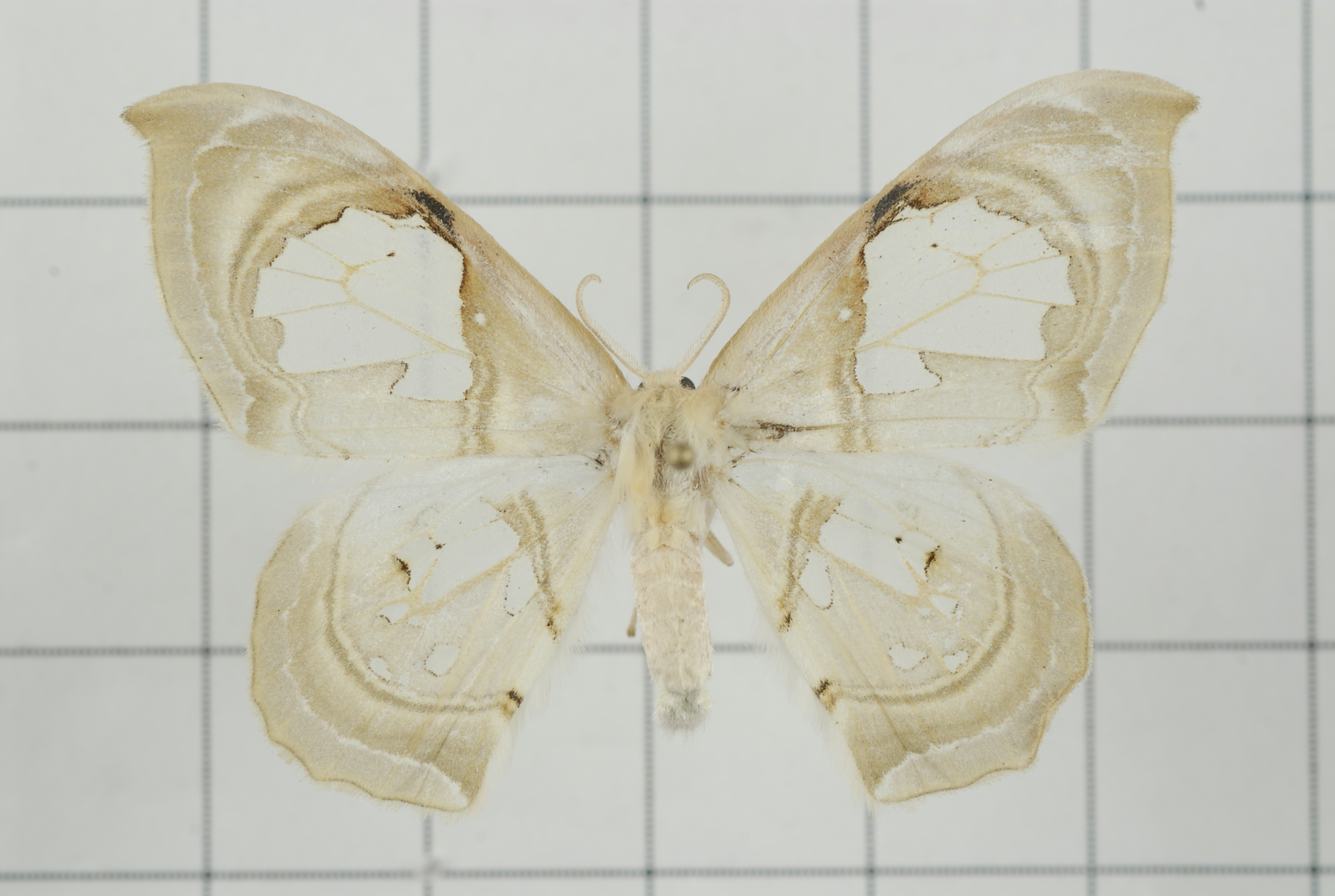

Scientific classification
- Domain: Eukaryota
- Kingdom: Animalia
- Phylum: Arthropoda
- Class: Insecta
- Order: Lepidoptera
- Family: Drepanidae
- Genus: Macrauzata
- Species: M. minor

Binomial name
- Macrauzata minor Okano, 1959

= Macrauzata minor =

Species of hook-tip moth

Macrauzata minor is a moth in the family Drepanidae first described by Okano in 1959. It is found in Taiwan.

The wingspan is 45–52 mm.

The larvae feed on the leaves of Castanopsis formosana and Quercus variabilis.
