= Ditrigona quinquelineata =

Scientific classification
- Domain: Eukaryota
- Kingdom: Animalia
- Phylum: Arthropoda
- Class: Insecta
- Order: Lepidoptera
- Family: Drepanidae
- Genus: Ditrigona
- Species: D. quinquelineata

Binomial name
- Ditrigona quinquelineata (Leech, 1898)

Synonyms
- Leucodrepana quinquelineata Leech, 1898; Auzatella quinquelineata

Species of hook-tip moth

Ditrigona quinquelineata is a moth in the family Drepanidae. It was described by John Henry Leech in 1898. It is found in Japan.
