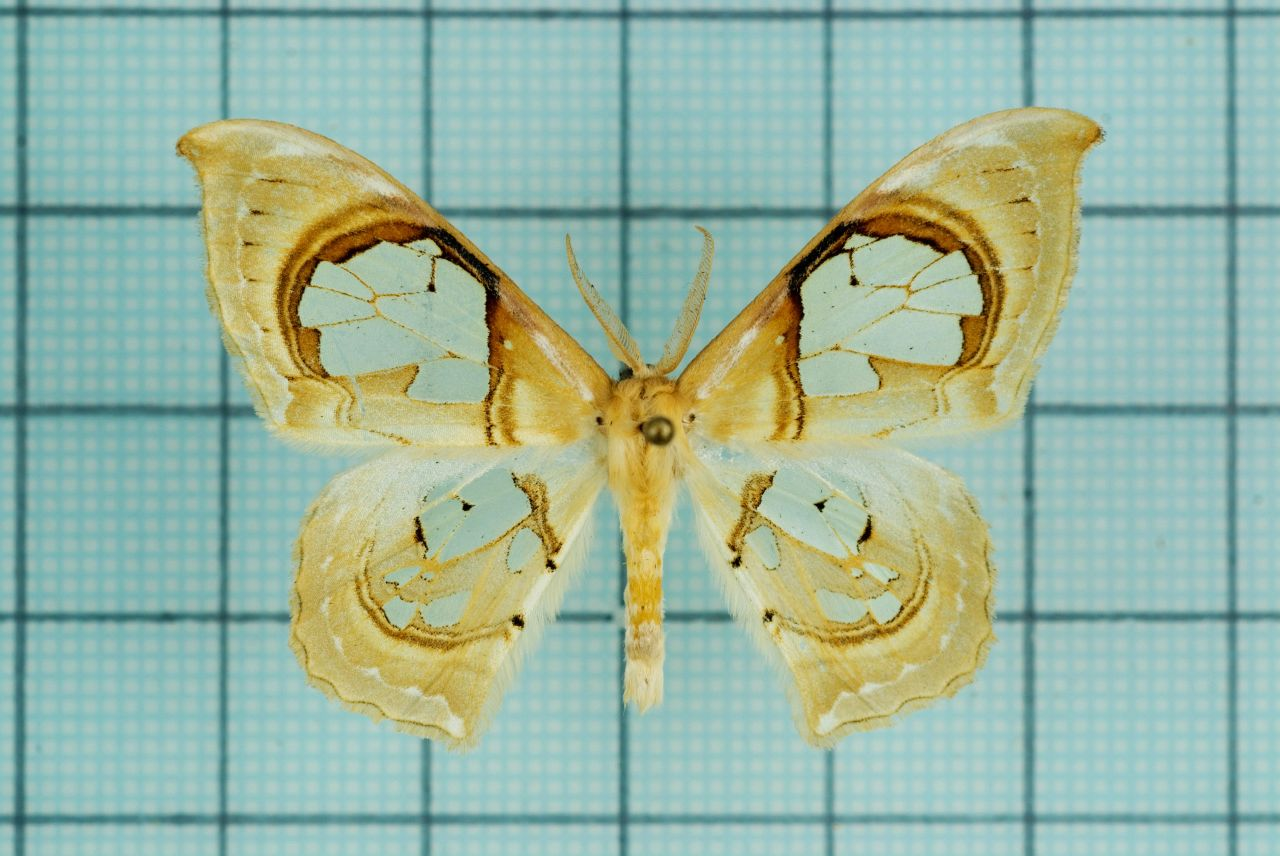
- Macrauzata fenestraria

Scientific classification
- Domain: Eukaryota
- Kingdom: Animalia
- Phylum: Arthropoda
- Class: Insecta
- Order: Lepidoptera
- Family: Drepanidae
- Subfamily: Drepaninae
- Genus: Macrauzata; Butler, 1889

= Macrauzata =

Moth genus in family Drepanidae

Macrauzata is a genus of moths belonging to the subfamily Drepaninae.

== Species ==
- Macrauzata fenestraria (Moore, [1868])
- Macrauzata maxima Inoue, 1960
- Macrauzata melanapex Inoue, 1993
- Macrauzata minor Okano, 1959
- Macrauzata submontana Holloway, 1976

== Undescribed species ==
- Macrauzata hyalinata Inoue, 1993 [manuscript name]
- Macrauzata limpidate Inoue, 1993 [manuscript name]
