= Canucha miranda =

Scientific classification
- Domain: Eukaryota
- Kingdom: Animalia
- Phylum: Arthropoda
- Class: Insecta
- Order: Lepidoptera
- Family: Drepanidae
- Genus: Canucha
- Species: C. miranda

Binomial name
- Canucha miranda Warren, 1923

Synonyms
- Canucha miranda f. formosicola Matsumura, 1931

Species of hook-tip moth

Canucha miranda is a moth in the family Drepanidae. It was described by Warren in 1923. It is found in north-eastern India, China and Taiwan.

The wingspan is 52–61 mm. Adults have been recorded on wing in August.
