= Macrauzata maxima =

Scientific classification
- Kingdom: Animalia
- Phylum: Arthropoda
- Class: Insecta
- Order: Lepidoptera
- Family: Drepanidae
- Genus: Macrauzata
- Species: M. maxima

Binomial name
- Macrauzata maxima Inoue, 1960

Species of hook-tip moth

Macrauzata maxima is a moth in the family Drepanidae. It was described by Hiroshi Inoue in 1960. It is found in Japan and the Chinese provinces of Sichuan, Zhejiang, Yunnan, Hunan, Fujian and Jiangsu.

== Subspecies ==
- Macrauzata maxima maxima (Japan)
- Macrauzata maxima chinensis Inoue, 1960 (China: Sichuan, Zhejiang, Yunnan, Hunan, Fujian, Jiangsu)
