= Drapetodes deumbrata =

Scientific classification
- Domain: Eukaryota
- Kingdom: Animalia
- Phylum: Arthropoda
- Class: Insecta
- Order: Lepidoptera
- Family: Drepanidae
- Genus: Drapetodes
- Species: D. deumbrata

Binomial name
- Drapetodes deumbrata Warren, 1922

Species of hook-tip moth

Drapetodes deumbrata is a moth in the family Drepanidae. It was described by Warren in 1922. It is found in Bali, Indonesia.
