= Ditrigona komarovi =

Scientific classification
- Domain: Eukaryota
- Kingdom: Animalia
- Phylum: Arthropoda
- Class: Insecta
- Order: Lepidoptera
- Family: Drepanidae
- Genus: Ditrigona
- Species: D. komarovi

Binomial name
- Ditrigona komarovi (Kurentzov, 1935)

Synonyms
- Leucodrepana komarovi Kurentzov, 1935

Species of hook-tip moth

Ditrigona komarovi is a moth in the family Drepanidae. It was described by Alekseya Ivanovitch Kurentzov in 1935. It is found in Ussuri in the Russian Far East.

The wingspan is 20–21 mm.
