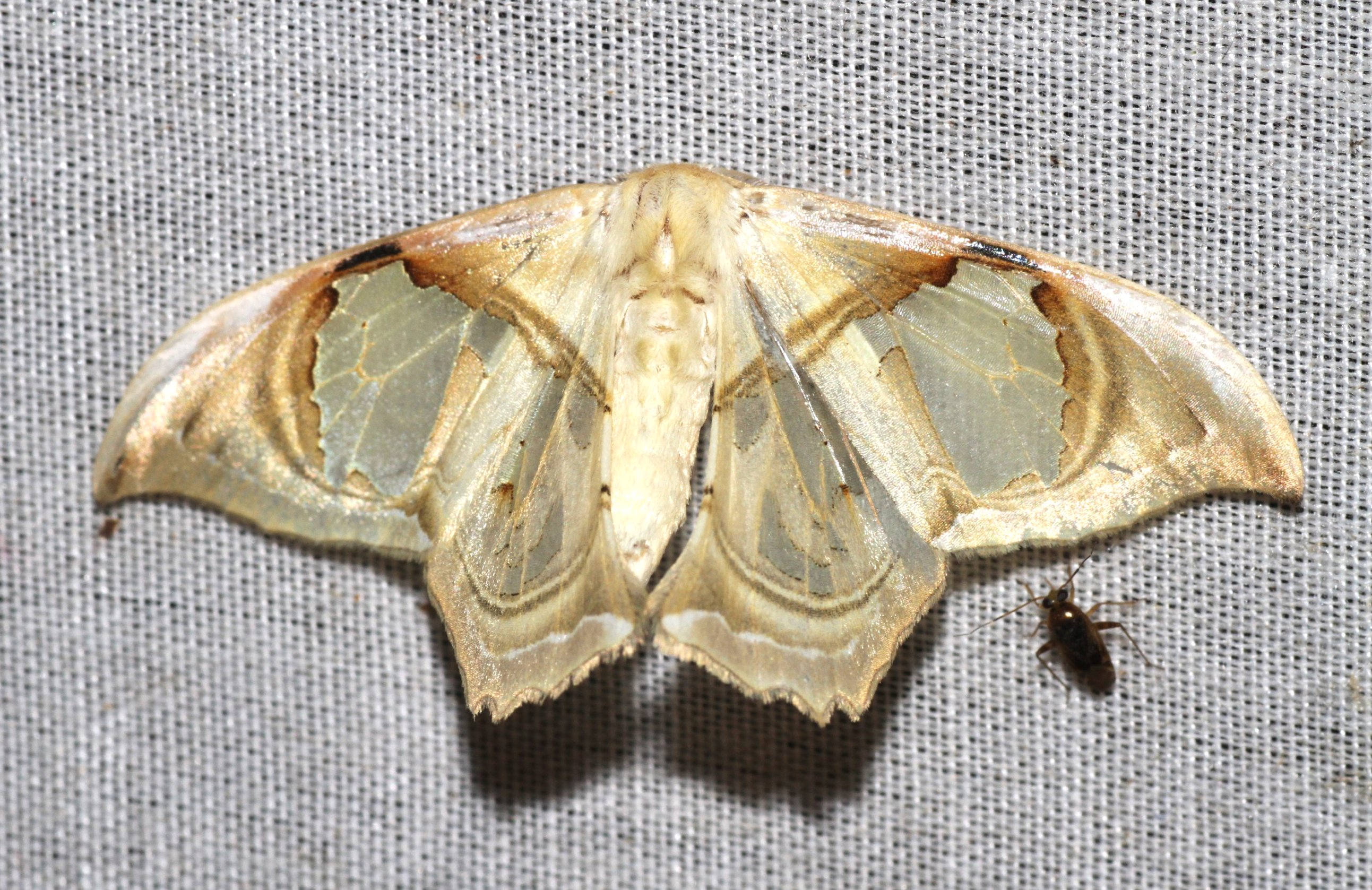

Scientific classification
- Kingdom: Animalia
- Phylum: Arthropoda
- Class: Insecta
- Order: Lepidoptera
- Family: Drepanidae
- Genus: Macrauzata
- Species: M. melanapex

Binomial name
- Macrauzata melanapex Inoue, 1993

= Macrauzata melanapex =

Species of hook-tip moth

Macrauzata melanapex is a moth in the family Drepanidae. It was described by Hiroshi Inoue in 1993. It is found on Borneo, Sumatra and Peninsular Malaysia.
