= Ditrigona polyobotaria =

Scientific classification
- Domain: Eukaryota
- Kingdom: Animalia
- Phylum: Arthropoda
- Class: Insecta
- Order: Lepidoptera
- Family: Drepanidae
- Genus: Ditrigona
- Species: D. polyobotaria

Binomial name
- Ditrigona polyobotaria (Oberthur, 1923)

Synonyms
- Corycia polyobotaria Oberthur, 1923

Species of hook-tip moth

Ditrigona polyobotaria is a moth in the family Drepanidae. It was described by Oberthur in 1923. It is found in China.

The wingspan is about 20 mm.
