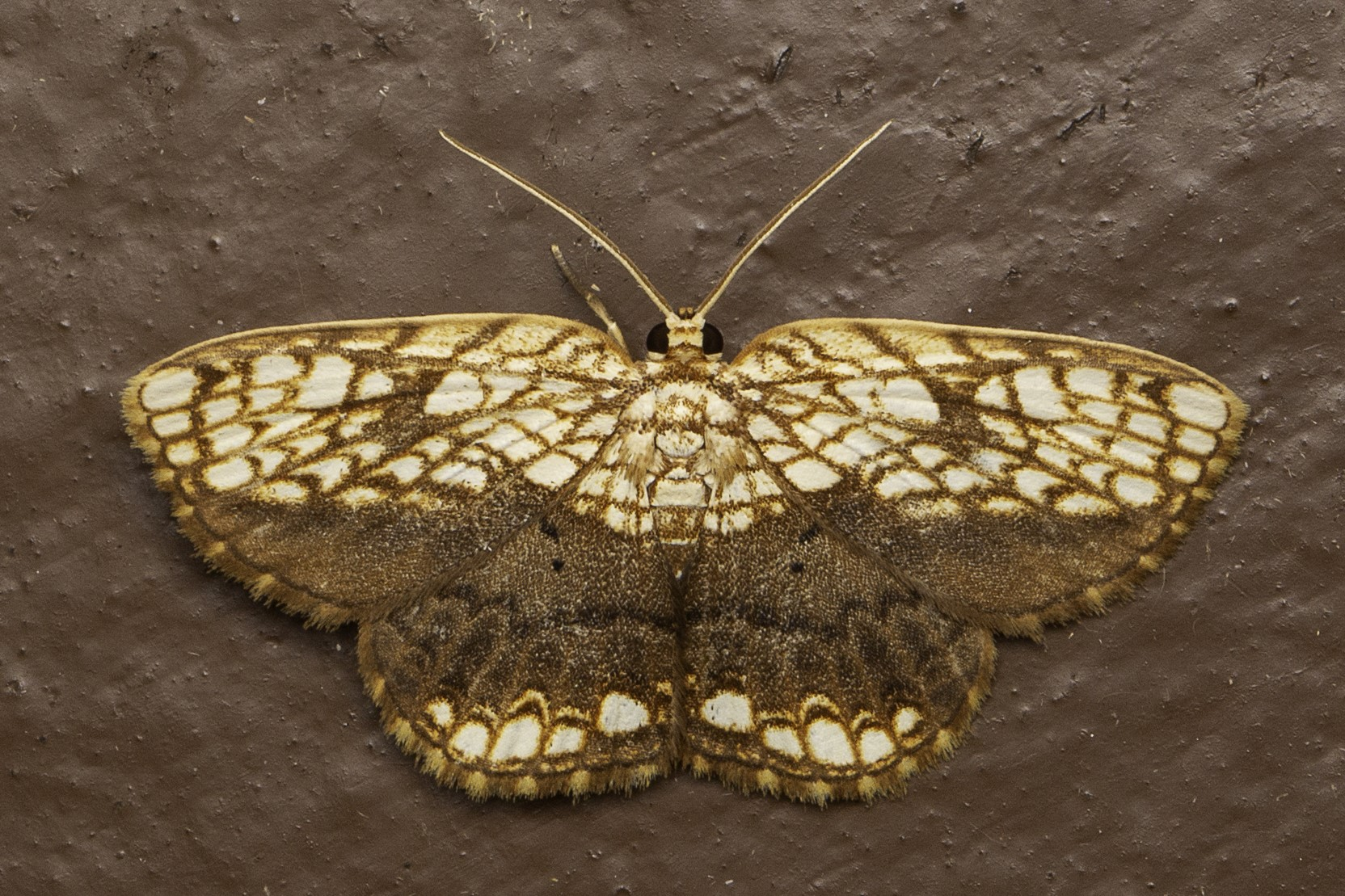

Scientific classification
- Kingdom: Animalia
- Phylum: Arthropoda
- Clade: Pancrustacea
- Class: Insecta
- Order: Lepidoptera
- Family: Drepanidae
- Genus: Drapetodes
- Species: D. nummularia

Binomial name
- Drapetodes nummularia Snellen, 1889

= Drapetodes nummularia =

Species of hook-tip moth

Drapetodes nummularia is a species of moth in the family Drepanidae. It was first described by Snellen in 1889. It is found on Java, Peninsular Malaysia and Borneo.

== Charactaristics ==
Drapetodes nummularia have a wingspan of 25-29mm. There are variations in the apperance of specimens of this species, being brownish-yellow and brownish-grey. The forewing is characteristically marked; many small whitish or yellowish crescent-shaped spots are present there, separated from one another by brown lines. The terminal part of the cell and the area from the inner margin up to half of the outer margin remains free and is thus uniform in color. On the hindwing, two black dots on the discocellular vein stand out, furthermore the same whitish spots at the base and marginally, while in the intervening area an irregular brownish-grey postmedial line is visible. The underside of the wing is dirty white without markings.
