= Thymistadopsis =

Scientific classification
- Domain: Eukaryota
- Kingdom: Animalia
- Phylum: Arthropoda
- Class: Insecta
- Order: Lepidoptera
- Family: Drepanidae
- Subfamily: Drepaninae
- Genus: Thymistadopsis; Warren in Seitz, 1922

Moth genus in family Drepanidae

Thymistadopsis is a genus of moths belonging to the subfamily Drepaninae.

== Species ==
- Thymistadopsis albidescens (Hampson, 1895)
- Thymistadopsis trilinearia (Moore, 1867)
- Thymistadopsis undulifera (Hampson, 1900)
