= Canucha curvaria =

Scientific classification
- Kingdom: Animalia
- Phylum: Arthropoda
- Class: Insecta
- Order: Lepidoptera
- Family: Drepanidae
- Genus: Canucha
- Species: C. curvaria

Binomial name
- Canucha curvaria Walker, 1866

Species of hook-tip moth

Canucha curvaria is a moth in the family Drepanidae. It was described by Francis Walker in 1866. It is found on Misool Island in New Guinea and on the Solomon Islands.

Adults are pale ochreous, the wings with indistinct ochreous specks and with some more conspicuous black specks, mostly along the exterior border. The veins are whitish and there is a whitish undulating line from near the tips of the forewings to a little beyond the middle of the interior border of the hindwings.
