= Macrauzata submontana =

Scientific classification
- Kingdom: Animalia
- Phylum: Arthropoda
- Clade: Pancrustacea
- Class: Insecta
- Order: Lepidoptera
- Family: Drepanidae
- Genus: Macrauzata
- Species: M. submontana

Binomial name
- Macrauzata submontana Holloway, 1976

Species of hook-tip moth

Macrauzata submontana is a moth in the family Drepanidae. It was described by Jeremy Daniel Holloway in 1976. It is found on Borneo, Peninsular Malaysia, Sumatra and Java.
