= Thymistadopsis albidescens =

Scientific classification
- Kingdom: Animalia
- Phylum: Arthropoda
- Class: Insecta
- Order: Lepidoptera
- Family: Drepanidae
- Genus: Thymistadopsis
- Species: T. albidescens

Binomial name
- Thymistadopsis albidescens (Hampson, 1895)

Synonyms
- Problepsidis albidescens Hampson, 1895

Species of hook-tip moth

Thymistadopsis albidescens is a moth in the family Drepanidae. It was described by George Hampson in 1895. It is found in the Indian states of Sikkim and Assam.

The wingspan is about 42 mm. Adults are greyish white, the forewings with a black speck at the end of the cell and a postmedial black spot on the costa. There is an oblique fine waved line from the apex to the inner margin beyond the middle with a black subapical mark on it. The marginal area is browner with indistinct submarginal and marginal brown lines. The hindwings have traces of an oblique subbasal line and there is a postmedial black band, as well as a diffused submarginal line and fine marginal line.
