= Ditrigona jardanaria =

Scientific classification
- Domain: Eukaryota
- Kingdom: Animalia
- Phylum: Arthropoda
- Class: Insecta
- Order: Lepidoptera
- Family: Drepanidae
- Genus: Ditrigona
- Species: D. jardanaria

Binomial name
- Ditrigona jardanaria (Oberthür, 1923)

Synonyms
- Corycia jardanaria Oberthür, 1923

Species of hook-tip moth

Ditrigona jardanaria is a moth in the family Drepanidae. It was described by Oberthür in 1923. It is found in western China and possibly Tibet.

The wingspan is 15.5-16.5 mm for males and 15-15.5 mm for females.
