= Ditrigona idaeoides =

Scientific classification
- Kingdom: Animalia
- Phylum: Arthropoda
- Class: Insecta
- Order: Lepidoptera
- Family: Drepanidae
- Genus: Ditrigona
- Species: D. idaeoides

Binomial name
- Ditrigona idaeoides (Hampson, [1893])

Synonyms
- Leucodrepana idaeoides Hampson, [1893]

Species of hook-tip moth

Ditrigona idaeoides is a moth in the family Drepanidae. It was described by George Hampson in 1893. It is found in Sri Lanka and Sikkim, India.

The length of the forewings is 15–16.5 mm for males and 16–17.5 mm for females. Adults are pure shining white, the forewings with an indistinct subbasal fuscous line. Both wings have two oblique antemedial waved lines and two postmedial lines, angled below the costa of the forewings and bent towards the inner margin of the hindwings. There is a waved submarginal and a fine marginal line.
