= Drapetodes lunulata =

Scientific classification
- Domain: Eukaryota
- Kingdom: Animalia
- Phylum: Arthropoda
- Class: Insecta
- Order: Lepidoptera
- Family: Drepanidae
- Genus: Drapetodes
- Species: D. lunulata

Binomial name
- Drapetodes lunulata Warren, 1896

Species of hook-tip moth

Drapetodes lunulata is a moth in the family Drepanidae. It was described by Warren in 1896. It is found in Indonesia (Java).

The wingspan is about 30 mm. The forewings are brownish ochreous, the inner margin at the base and an oblique streak from the apex to the middle of the inner margin ochreous yellow. There are some darker brown irregular streaks on the inner area. The pale streak towards the apex is crossed by two series of brown markings, succeeded by six broad whitish marks, the last three lying in an oblique line to the inner margin. There is a dark grey-brown triangular space at the anal angle and a dark brown marginal line. The basal area of the hindwings is yellowish, crossed by two brown lines. The median area is greyish ochreous, with two black discal spots and a darker postmedial line. There is a row of irregular yellow lunules, each edged internally by a paler brown-edged crescentic mark.
