= Drapetodes interlineata =

Scientific classification
- Domain: Eukaryota
- Kingdom: Animalia
- Phylum: Arthropoda
- Class: Insecta
- Order: Lepidoptera
- Family: Drepanidae
- Genus: Drapetodes
- Species: D. interlineata

Binomial name
- Drapetodes interlineata Warren, 1896

Species of hook-tip moth

Drapetodes interlineata is a moth in the family Drepanidae. It was described by Warren in 1896. It is found in Singapore, on Peninsular Malaya and in Indonesia (Java).

The wingspan is 24 mm for males and 26 mm for females. The forewings are pale brownish ochreous with a white costal edge. There is a subcostal line of shining black scales from the middle of the base to near the apex, before which it is bent at right angles and waved to the third median, and again bent and oblique to the inner margin before the middle, in the lower part and along the waved apical portion of it has a broad pale inner edge. Between the two lines are two similar brownish lines from the inner margin nearer the base, waved before the apex. There is a very fine dark lunulate submarginal line from the apex, marked with black dots on the veins. The hindwings are crossed by straight lines. The basal area is pale and there are two dark antemedial lines enclosing a brown fascia with a line along its centre. There is also a pale fascia with a black cell-dot in it, edged by a brown line. The exterior line is black, finely crenulate, with a pale broad inner edge, preceded and followed by a pair of brown lines. The submarginal line is straight, dark, the margin beyond it darker.
