= Ditrigona pomenaria =

Scientific classification
- Domain: Eukaryota
- Kingdom: Animalia
- Phylum: Arthropoda
- Class: Insecta
- Order: Lepidoptera
- Family: Drepanidae
- Genus: Ditrigona
- Species: D. pomenaria

Binomial name
- Ditrigona pomenaria (Oberthür, 1923)

Synonyms
- Corycia (Bapta) pomenaria Oberthür, 1923

Species of hook-tip moth

Ditrigona pomenaria is a moth in the family Drepanidae. It was described by Oberthür in 1923. It is found in China.

The wingspan is about 21 mm.
