= Ditrigona inconspicua =

Scientific classification
- Domain: Eukaryota
- Kingdom: Animalia
- Phylum: Arthropoda
- Class: Insecta
- Order: Lepidoptera
- Family: Drepanidae
- Genus: Ditrigona
- Species: D. inconspicua

Binomial name
- Ditrigona inconspicua (Leech, 1898)

Synonyms
- Teldenia inconspicua Leech, 1898; Peridrepana inconspicua

Species of hook-tip moth

Ditrigona inconspicua is a moth in the family Drepanidae. It was described by John Henry Leech in 1898. It is found in western China.

The wingspan is 16.5 mm.
