= Canucha sublignata =

Scientific classification
- Domain: Eukaryota
- Kingdom: Animalia
- Phylum: Arthropoda
- Class: Insecta
- Order: Lepidoptera
- Family: Drepanidae
- Genus: Canucha
- Species: C. sublignata

Binomial name
- Canucha sublignata (Warren, 1902)

Synonyms
- Campylopteryx sublignata Warren, 1902; Campylopteryx fleximargo Warren, 1896; Canucha fleximargo

Species of hook-tip moth

Canucha sublignata is a moth in the family Drepanidae. It was described by Warren in 1902. It is found in New Guinea and on the Moluccas.

The wingspan is about 48 mm. The forewings are ochreous, dappled with grey brown. The costa is pale, the extreme costal edge dark brown, towards the apex spotted with brown and paler intervals. The first line is found at one-fourth. It is pale and indistinct, outwardly toothed on the veins, followed by a deeper brown shade. The cell spot is round and black. The outer line is pale ochreous, from the inner margin at three-fourths to shortly before the apex, where it is acutely angled, runs inwards parallel to the veins for a short distance, and is again angled before reaching the costa. The veins within this line are all pale ochreous. The marginal area is brownish, above the anal angle with a patch of mixed ochreous-grey and blackish scales. The hindwings are darker brown, except along the costa, which is ochreous, freckled with brown and black.
