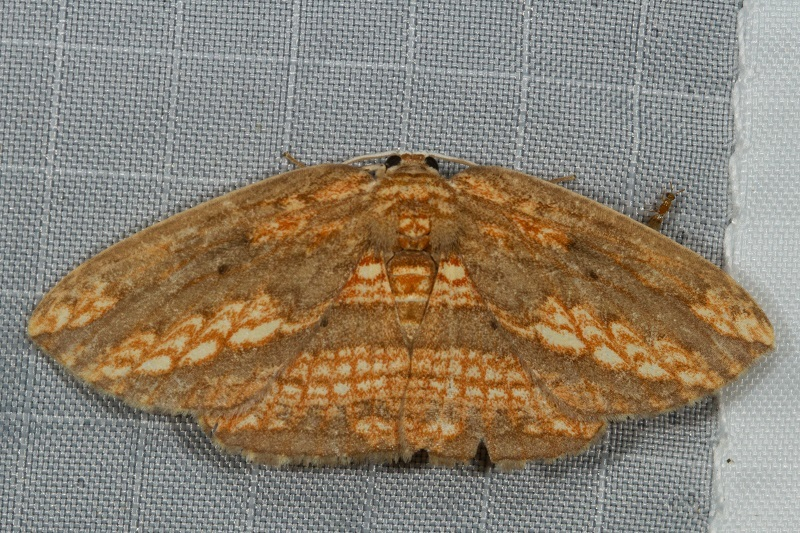

Scientific classification
- Kingdom: Animalia
- Phylum: Arthropoda
- Clade: Pancrustacea
- Class: Insecta
- Order: Lepidoptera
- Family: Drepanidae
- Genus: Drapetodes
- Species: D. magnifica

Binomial name
- Drapetodes magnifica Swinhoe, 1902

= Drapetodes magnifica =

Species of moth

Drapetodes magnifica is a species of moth in the family Drepanidae. It was first described by Charles Swinhoe in 1902. It is found on Peninsular Malaysia, Sumatra, Java and Borneo.

Adults are ochreous brown, both wings banded and marked with pale ochreous, in the forewings there is a streak near the base and another at the apex as if portions of one band. There is also a broad band from the hindmargin a little beyond the middle, to the outer margin above the middle. On the hindwings there is a subbasal band from the abdominal margin, short, and with a white band on its inner edge, and a broad discal band which below the apex, and at the anal angle touches the outer margin. All these bands are longitudinally streaked with bright orange lunular lines close together. There is also a brown spot at the end of each cell, as well as a dark brown marginal line.

== Subspecies ==
- Drapetodes magnifica magnifica (Peninsular Malaysia, Sumatra, Java, Borneo)
- Drapetodes magnifica denotata Watson, 1961 (eastern Borneo)
