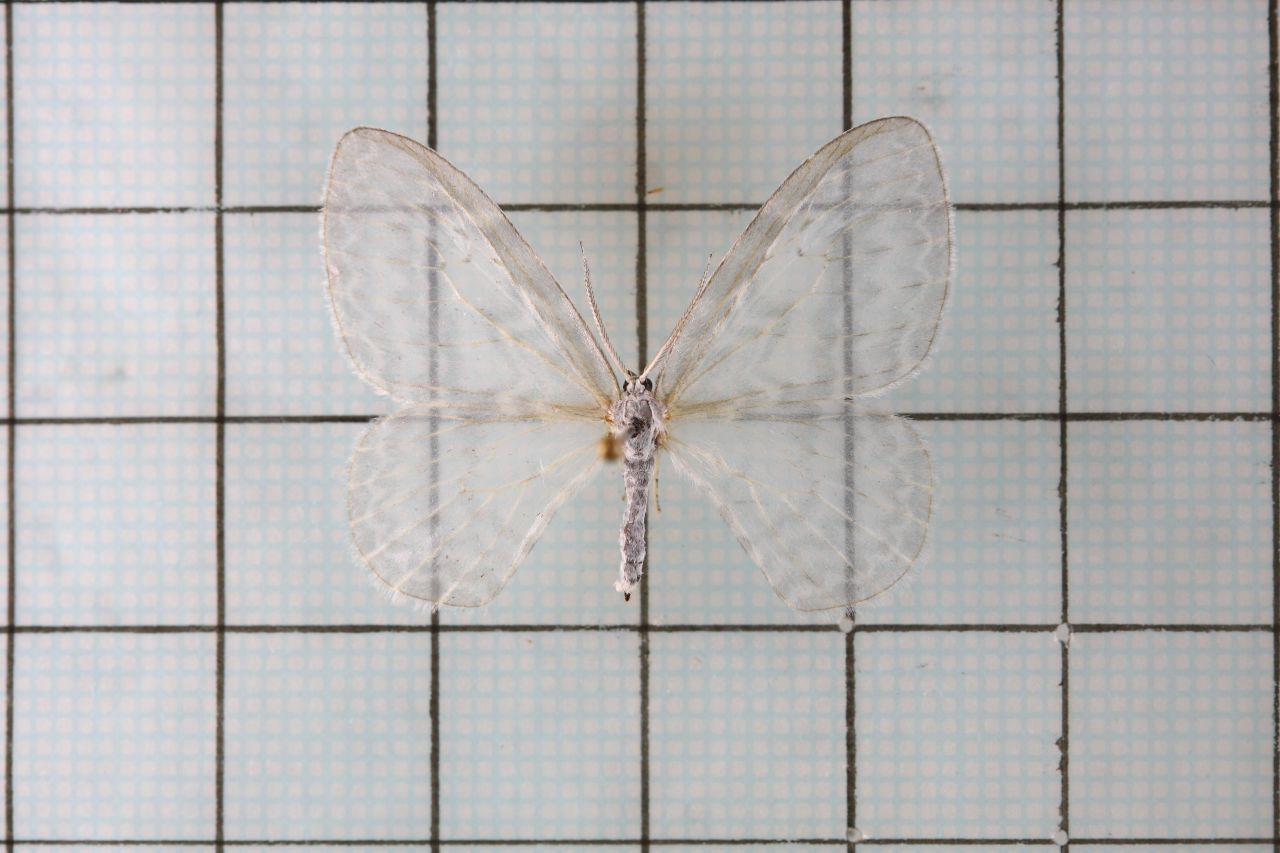
- Deroca hidda ampla Inoue 1988

Scientific classification
- Domain: Eukaryota
- Kingdom: Animalia
- Phylum: Arthropoda
- Class: Insecta
- Order: Lepidoptera
- Family: Drepanidae
- Tribe: Drepanini
- Genus: Deroca; Walker, 1855

Synonyms
- Deroea Pagenstecher, 1909

= Deroca =

Moth genus in family Drepanidae

Deroca is a genus of moths belonging to the subfamily Drepaninae. It was erected by Francis Walker in 1855.

== Species ==
- Deroca hidda Swinhoe, 1900
- Deroca hyalina Walker, 1855
- Deroca inconclusa (Walker, 1856)
- Deroca pulla Watson, 1957
