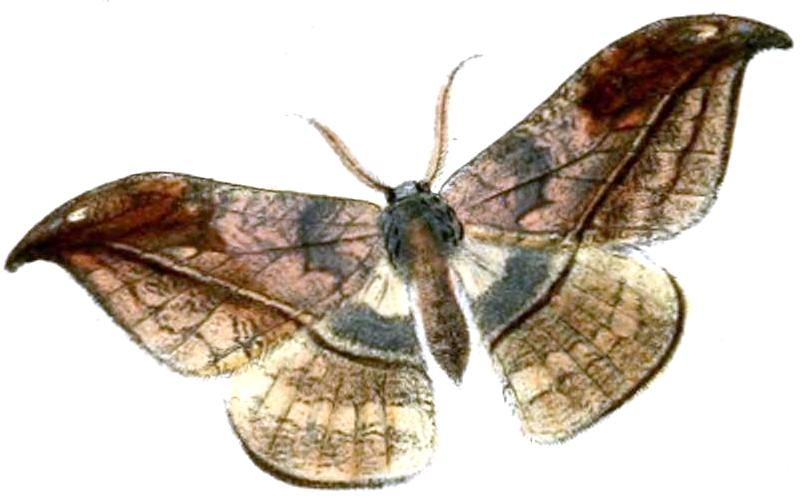
- Canucha duplexa

Scientific classification
- Domain: Eukaryota
- Kingdom: Animalia
- Phylum: Arthropoda
- Class: Insecta
- Order: Lepidoptera
- Family: Drepanidae
- Subfamily: Drepaninae
- Tribe: Drepanini
- Genus: Canucha; Walker, 1866

Synonyms
- Campylopteryx Warren, 1902

= Canucha =

Moth genus in family Drepanidae

Canucha is a genus of moths belonging to the subfamily Drepaninae. The genus was erected by Francis Walker in 1866.

== Species ==
- Canucha bouvieri Oberthür, 1916
- Canucha curvaria Walker, 1866
- Canucha duplexa (Moore, [1866])
- Canucha miranda Warren, 1923
- Canucha specularis (Moore, 1879)
- Canucha sublignata (Warren, 1902)
