= Deroca pulla =

Scientific classification
- Domain: Eukaryota
- Kingdom: Animalia
- Phylum: Arthropoda
- Class: Insecta
- Order: Lepidoptera
- Family: Drepanidae
- Genus: Deroca
- Species: D. pulla

Binomial name
- Deroca pulla Watson, 1957

Species of hook-tip moth

Deroca pulla is a moth in the family Drepanidae. It was described by Watson in 1957. It is found in the Chinese provinces of Sichuan and Hubei.
