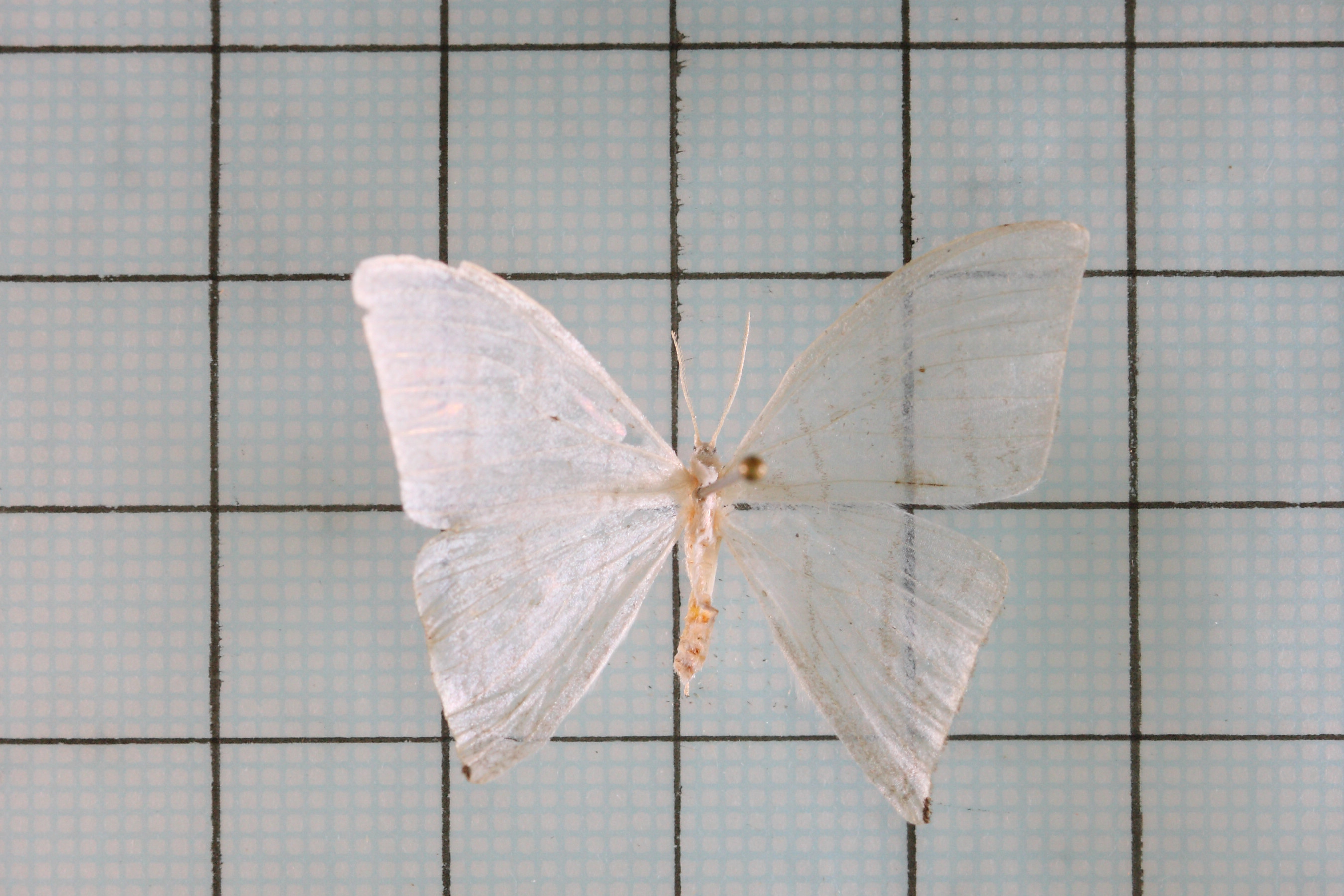
- Ditrigona triangularia

Scientific classification
- Domain: Eukaryota
- Kingdom: Animalia
- Phylum: Arthropoda
- Class: Insecta
- Order: Lepidoptera
- Family: Drepanidae
- Subfamily: Drepaninae
- Genus: Ditrigona; Moore, 1888

Synonyms
- Leucodrepana Hampson, [1893]; Leucodrepanilla Strand, 1911; Auzatella Strand, 1917; Peridrepana Butler, 1889; Thaleridia Moore, 1888

= Ditrigona =

Moth genus in family Drepanidae

Ditrigona is a genus of moths belonging to the subfamily Drepaninae. The genus was erected by Frederic Moore in 1888.

== Species ==
- species group derocina
  - Ditrigona derocina (Bryk, 1943)
  - Ditrigona diana Wilkinson, 1968
  - Ditrigona pruinosa (Moore, 1888)
- species group quinaria
  - Ditrigona furvicosta (Hampson, 1911)
  - Ditrigona idaeoides (Hampson, [1893])
  - Ditrigona inconspicua (Leech, 1898)
  - Ditrigona innotata (Hampson, 1892)
  - Ditrigona jardanaria (Oberthür, 1923)
  - Ditrigona media Wilkinson, 1968
  - Ditrigona obliquilinea (Hampson, 1892)
  - Ditrigona quinaria (Moore, 1867)
  - Ditrigona sericea (Leech, 1898)
  - Ditrigona spatulata Wilkinson, 1968
  - Ditrigona spilota Wilkinson, 1968
- species group triangularia
  - Ditrigona fasciata (Hampson, 1893)
  - Ditrigona polyobotaria (Oberthür, 1923)
  - Ditrigona pomenaria (Oberthür, 1923)
  - Ditrigona regularis Warren, 1922
  - Ditrigona sciara Wilkinson, 1968
  - Ditrigona titana Wilkinson, 1968
  - Ditrigona triangularia (Moore, [1868])
  - Ditrigona typhodes Wilkinson, 1968
- species group mytylata
  - Ditrigona aphya Wilkinson, 1968
  - Ditrigona artema Wilkinson, 1968
  - Ditrigona berres Wilkinson, 1968
  - Ditrigona candida Wilkinson, 1968
  - Ditrigona chama Wilkinson, 1968
  - Ditrigona chionea Wilkinson, 1968
  - Ditrigona cirruncata Wilkinson, 1968
  - Ditrigona conflexaria (Strand, [1917])
  - Ditrigona komarovi Kurenzov, 1935
  - Ditrigona legnichrysa Wilkinson, 1968
  - Ditrigona lineata (Leech, 1898)
  - Ditrigona margarita Wilkinson, 1968
  - Ditrigona marmorea Wilkinson, 1968
  - Ditrigona mytylata (Guenée, 1868)
  - Ditrigona platytes Wilkinson, 1968
  - Ditrigona policharia (Oberthür, 1923)
  - Ditrigona quinquelineata (Leech, 1898)
  - Ditrigona sacra (Butler, 1878)
- unknown species group
  - Ditrigona paludicola Holloway, 1998
  - Ditrigona pentesticha (Chu & Wang, 1987)
  - Ditrigona wilkinsoni Holloway, 1998
