= Ditrigona sacra =

Scientific classification
- Domain: Eukaryota
- Kingdom: Animalia
- Phylum: Arthropoda
- Class: Insecta
- Order: Lepidoptera
- Family: Drepanidae
- Genus: Ditrigona
- Species: D. sacra

Binomial name
- Ditrigona sacra (Butler, 1878)

Synonyms
- Corycia sacra Butler, 1878; Bapta sacra; Leucodrepana sacra; Leucodrepanilla sacra; Corycia virgo Butler, 1878; Leucodrepana virgo; Leucodrepanilla virgo

Species of hook-tip moth

Ditrigona sacra is a moth in the family Drepanidae. It was described by Arthur Gardiner Butler in 1878. It is found in Japan and Korea.
