= Ditrigona lineata =

Scientific classification
- Domain: Eukaryota
- Kingdom: Animalia
- Phylum: Arthropoda
- Class: Insecta
- Order: Lepidoptera
- Family: Drepanidae
- Genus: Ditrigona
- Species: D. lineata

Binomial name
- Ditrigona lineata (Leech, 1898)

Synonyms
- Leucodrepana lineata Leech, 1898

Species of hook-tip moth

Ditrigona lineata is a moth in the family Drepanidae. It was described by John Henry Leech in 1898. It is found in China.

The wingspan is 17–19 mm for males and 19–24 mm for females.

== Subspecies ==
- Ditrigona lineata lineata (China: Yunnan, Sichuan)
- Ditrigona lineata tephroides Wilkinson, 1968 (China: Shaanxi, Tibet)
