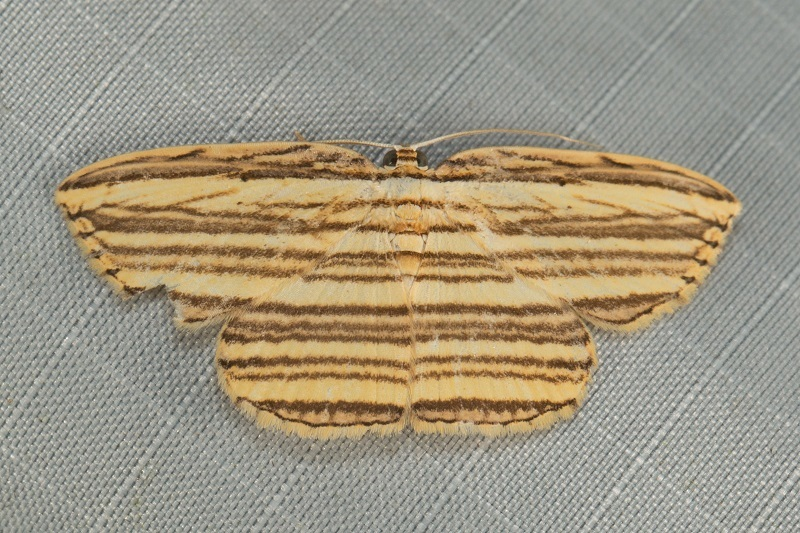

Scientific classification
- Kingdom: Animalia
- Phylum: Arthropoda
- Clade: Pancrustacea
- Class: Insecta
- Order: Lepidoptera
- Family: Drepanidae
- Genus: Drapetodes
- Species: D. barlowi

Binomial name
- Drapetodes barlowi Holloway, 1998

= Drapetodes barlowi =

Species of hook-tip moth

Drapetodes barlowi is a species of moth in the family Drepanidae. It was first described by Jeremy Daniel Holloway in 1998. It is found on Peninsular Malaysia, Borneo and Sumatra.
