= Ditrigona derocina =

Scientific classification
- Domain: Eukaryota
- Kingdom: Animalia
- Phylum: Arthropoda
- Class: Insecta
- Order: Lepidoptera
- Family: Drepanidae
- Genus: Ditrigona
- Species: D. derocina

Binomial name
- Ditrigona derocina (Bryk, 1943)

Synonyms
- Peridrepana derocina Bryk, 1943

Species of hook-tip moth

Ditrigona derocina is a moth in the family Drepanidae. It was described by Felix Bryk in 1943. It is found in Myanmar.

The wingspan is 15–17 mm for males and 17.5–19 mm for females. The wings are white where scaled, but largely colourless and semi-transparent.
