= Ditrigona fasciata =

Scientific classification
- Kingdom: Animalia
- Phylum: Arthropoda
- Class: Insecta
- Order: Lepidoptera
- Family: Drepanidae
- Genus: Ditrigona
- Species: D. fasciata

Binomial name
- Ditrigona fasciata (Hampson, 1893)

Synonyms
- Drepana fasciata Hampson, 1893; Callidrepana fasciata

Species of hook-tip moth

Ditrigona fasciata is a moth in the family Drepanidae. It was described by George Hampson in 1893. It is found in Sikkim, India.
