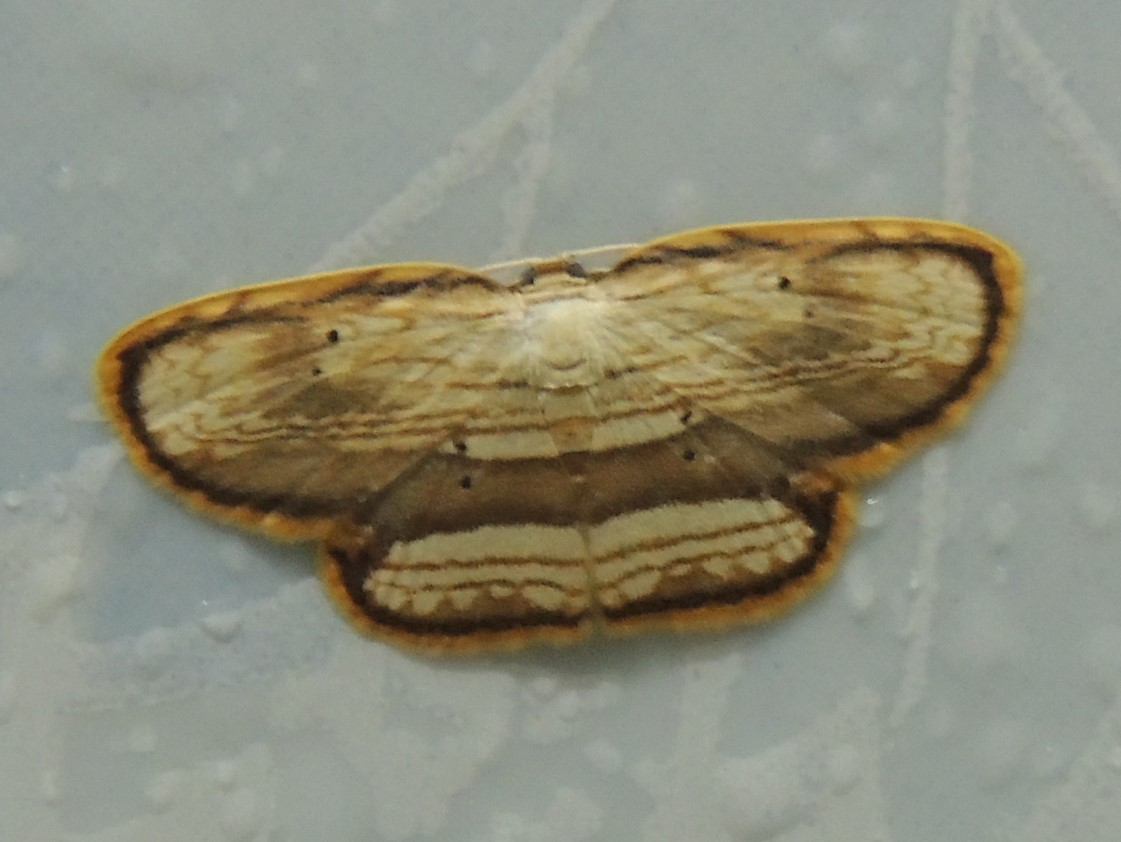

Scientific classification
- Kingdom: Animalia
- Phylum: Arthropoda
- Clade: Pancrustacea
- Class: Insecta
- Order: Lepidoptera
- Family: Drepanidae
- Genus: Drapetodes
- Species: D. fratercula

Binomial name
- Drapetodes fratercula Moore, 1887

= Drapetodes fratercula =

Species of hook-tip moth

Drapetodes fratercula is a species of moth in the family Drepanidae. It was first described by Frederic Moore in 1887. It is found in Sri Lanka, north-eastern Himalaya, Borneo, Bali, and Sulawesi.

== Description ==
Both wings with the outer margins excised below the apices and angled at vein 4. Body is fulvous yellow. Forewing with a plumbeous line below the costa of forewing from the base to the apex, then passing inside the outer margin to outer angle. The basal area of both wings, and all the markings well defined. The mesothorax, metathorax and abdomen pale. Abdomen has dark bands. Larva salmon pink. Head pale yellow with two brown transverse bands. Anal somite tapering to a bifid point, each somite with six small setaceous glandular spines. Dorsal surface of first, second, and third somites are dull green, whereas fourth, fifth tenth and eleventh somites are brownish. Lateral area of sixth to ninth somites is yellowish. There is a lateral series of six dark brown diagonal stripes. Final instar spins a cocoon in a rolled up lead. Pupa covered with white bloom.

== Ecology ==
The known host plants of the larvae are cardamom and allies of family Zingiberaceae.
