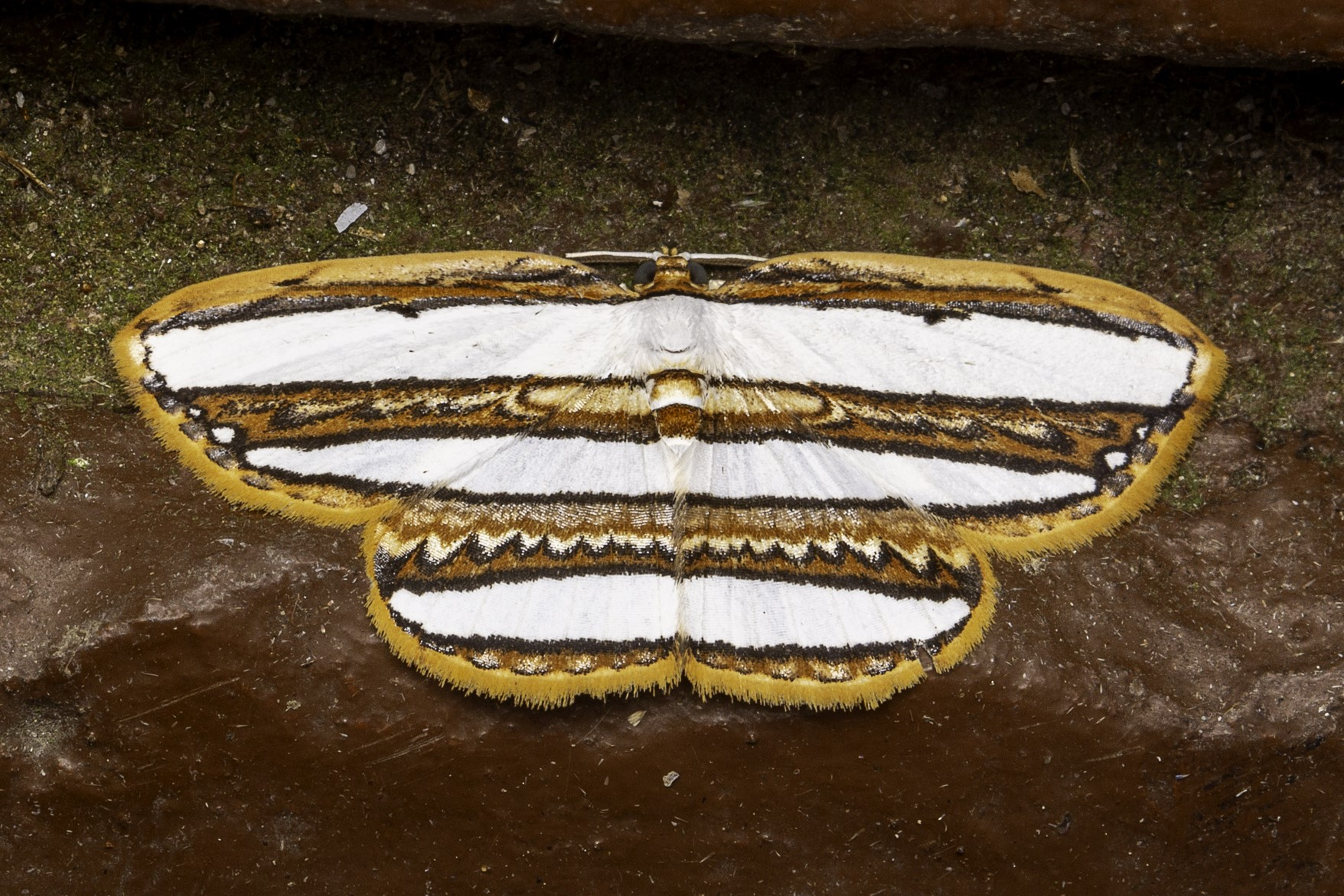
- Drapetodes matulata

Scientific classification
- Kingdom: Animalia
- Phylum: Arthropoda
- Clade: Pancrustacea
- Class: Insecta
- Order: Lepidoptera
- Family: Drepanidae
- Subfamily: Drepaninae
- Tribe: Drepanini
- Genus: Drapetodes; Guenée in Boisduval & Guenée, 1857

= Drapetodes =

Moth genus in family Drepanidae

Drapetodes is a genus of moths belonging to the subfamily Drepaninae.

== Species ==
- Drapetodes magnifica Swinhoe, 1902
- Drapetodes matulata Felder, 1874
- Drapetodes interlineata Warren, 1896
- Drapetodes mitaria Guenée, 1857
- Drapetodes fratercula Moore, 1887
- Drapetodes deumbrata Warren, 1922
- Drapetodes circumscripta Warren, 1922
- Drapetodes lunulata Warren, 1896
- Drapetodes croceago Hampson, 1895
- Drapetodes nummularia Snellen, 1889
- Drapetodes barlowi Holloway, 1998
