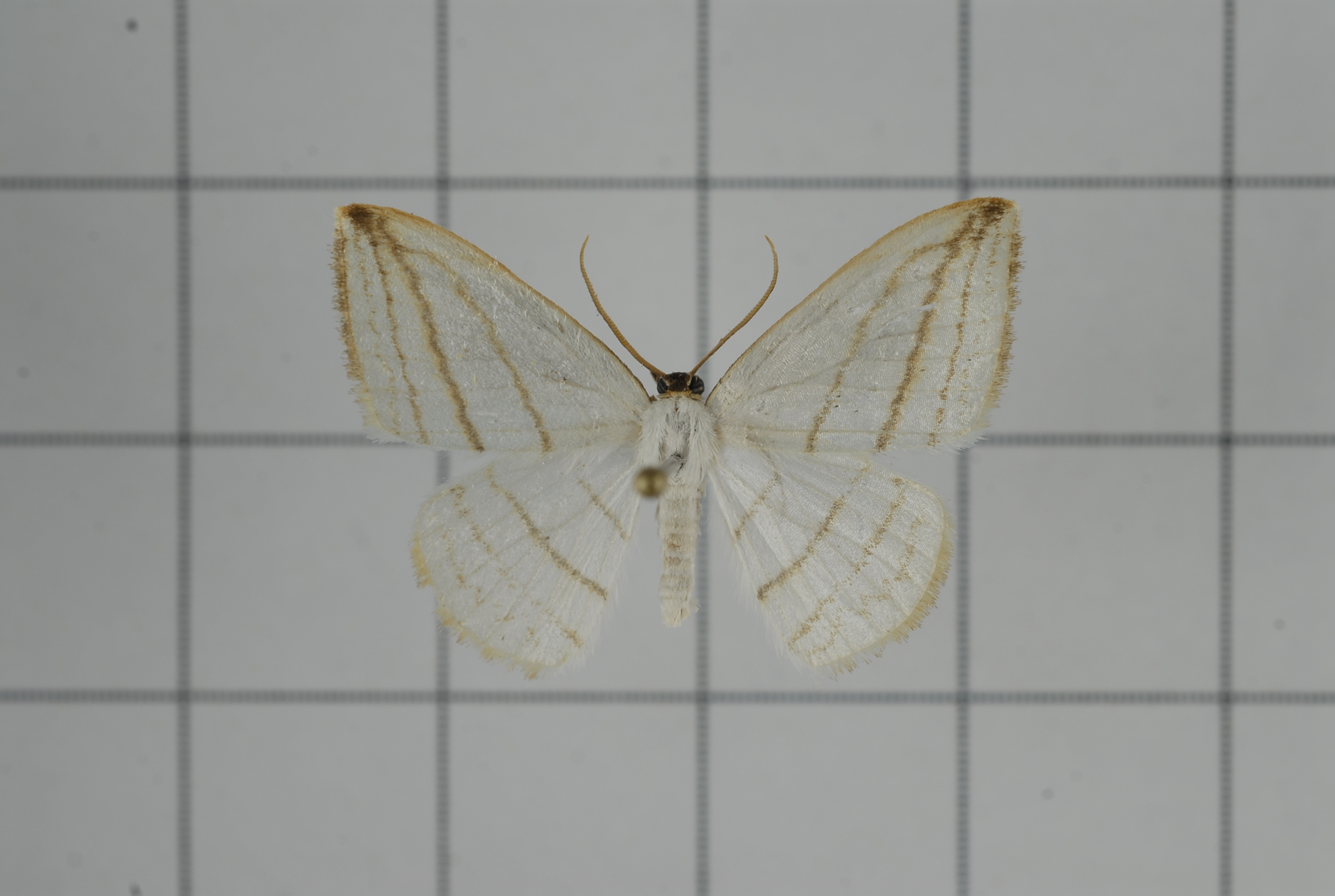

Scientific classification
- Kingdom: Animalia
- Phylum: Arthropoda
- Class: Insecta
- Order: Lepidoptera
- Family: Drepanidae
- Genus: Ditrigona
- Species: D. conflexaria

Binomial name
- Ditrigona conflexaria (Strand, [1917])

Synonyms
- Acidalia conflexaria Strand, [1917]; Auzata (Auzatella) micronioides Strand, 1916; Leucodrepana micronioides; Ditrigona micronioides Strand, 1917

= Ditrigona conflexaria =

Species of hook-tip moth

Ditrigona conflexaria is a moth in the family Drepanidae. It was described by Embrik Strand in 1917. It is found in China, Japan and Taiwan.

== Subspecies ==
- D. c. conflexaria (northern China)
- D. c. cerodeta Wilkinson, 1968 (China: Yunnan)
- D. c. micronioides (Strand, 1916) (eastern China, Taiwan, Japan)
