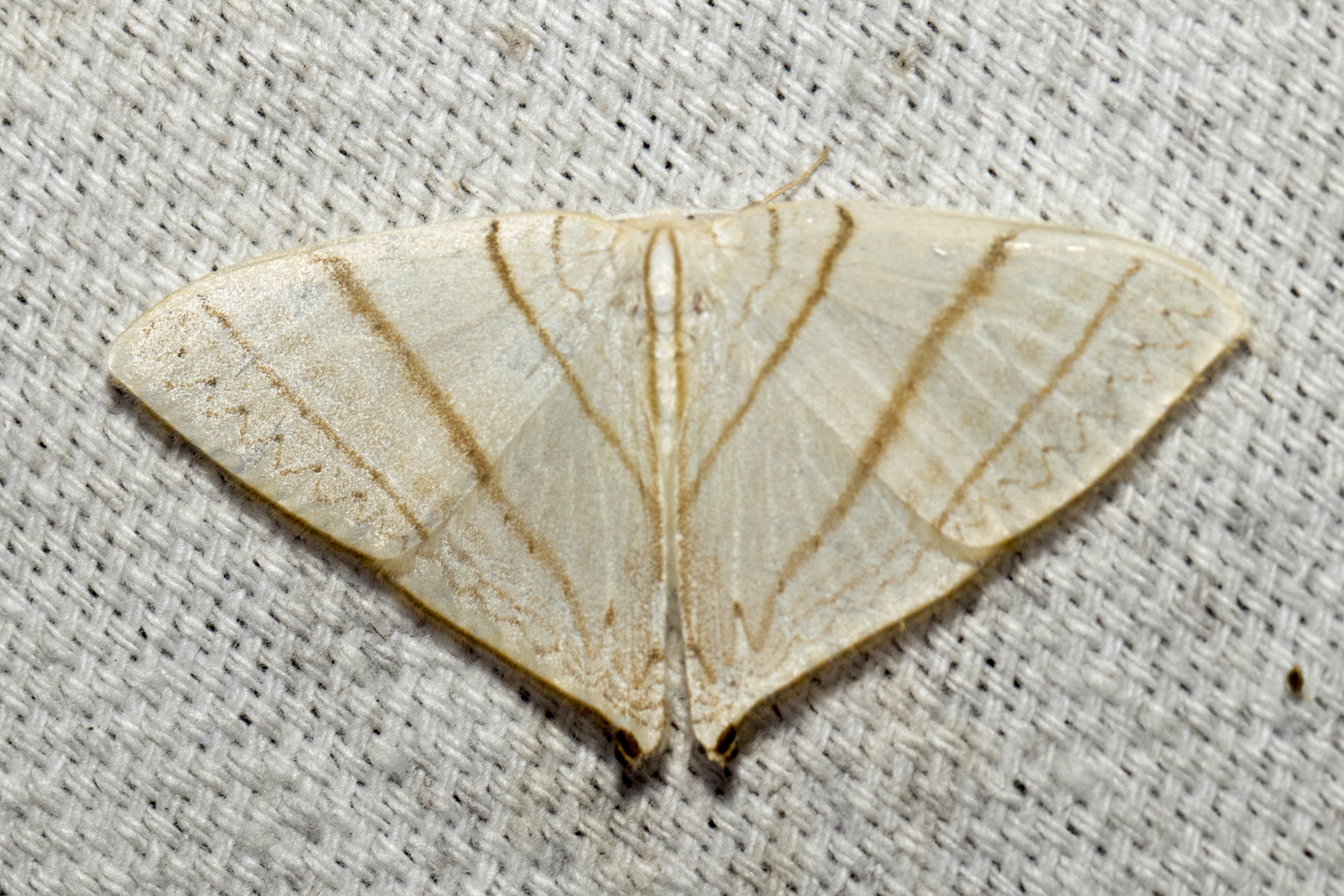

Scientific classification
- Kingdom: Animalia
- Phylum: Arthropoda
- Class: Insecta
- Order: Lepidoptera
- Family: Drepanidae
- Genus: Ditrigona
- Species: D. regularis

Binomial name
- Ditrigona regularis Warren, 1922

Synonyms
- Ditrigona regularis differentiata Bryk, 1943

= Ditrigona regularis =

Species of hook-tip moth

Ditrigona regularis is a moth in the family Drepanidae. It was described by Warren in 1922. It is found in India (Assam) and Burma.

The wingspan is 15–17.5 mm for males and 16.5–19 mm for females.
