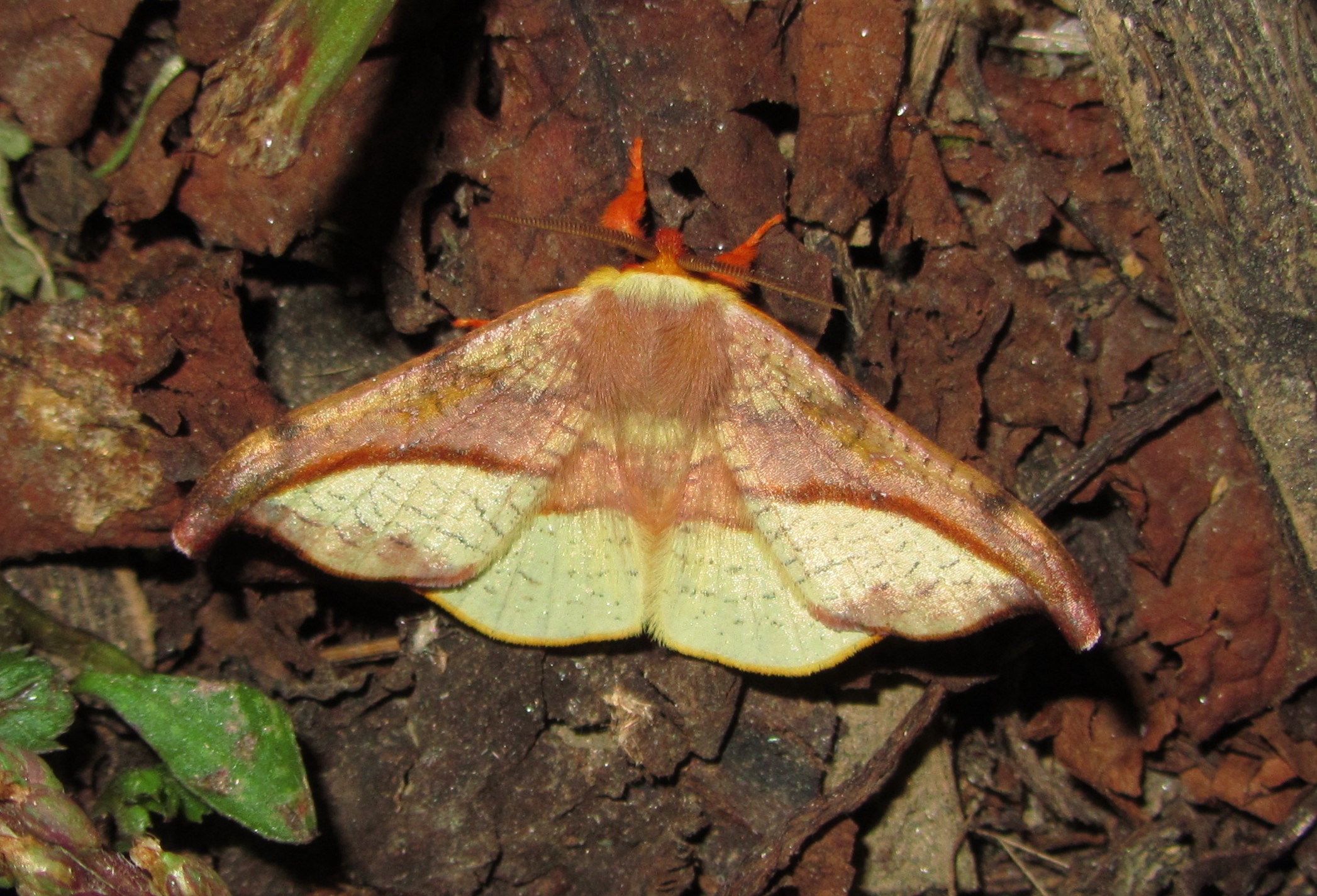

Scientific classification
- Domain: Eukaryota
- Kingdom: Animalia
- Phylum: Arthropoda
- Class: Insecta
- Order: Lepidoptera
- Family: Drepanidae
- Genus: Oreta
- Species: O. vatama

Binomial name
- Oreta vatama Moore, [1866]

= Oreta vatama =

Species of hook-tip moth

Oreta vatama is a moth in the family Drepanidae, described by Frederic Moore in 1866. It lives in Pakistan, India, Bhutan, northern Myanmar and China. The forewing length is 17–24 mm for males and 20–25 mm for females.

== Subspecies ==
- Oreta vatama vatama (northeastern India, Sikkim, Bhutan, northern Myanmar)
- Oreta vatama acutula Watson, 1967 (China: Guangxi, Sichuan, Yunnan, Tibet)
- Oreta vatama luculenta Watson, 1967 (northwestern India, Kashmir, Pakistan)
- Oreta vatama tsina Watson, 1967 (China: Shaanxi, Gansu)
