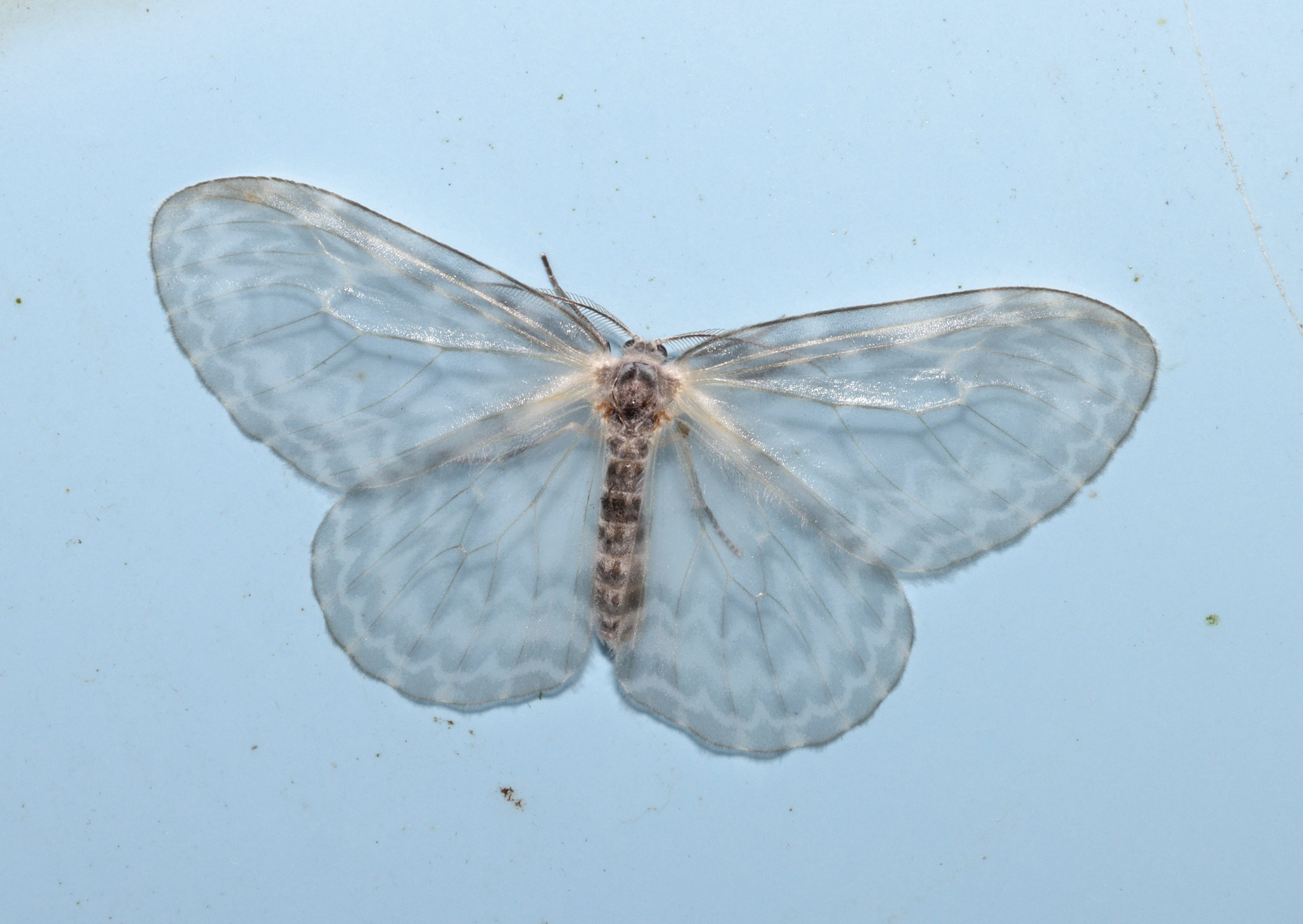

Scientific classification
- Kingdom: Animalia
- Phylum: Arthropoda
- Clade: Pancrustacea
- Class: Insecta
- Order: Lepidoptera
- Family: Drepanidae
- Genus: Deroca
- Species: D. hyalina

Binomial name
- Deroca hyalina Walker, 1855

= Deroca hyalina =

Species of hook-tip moth

Deroca hyalina is a moth in the family Drepanidae. It was described by Francis Walker in 1855. It is found in India, Myanmar and China.

== Subspecies ==
- Deroca hyalina hyalina (India, Myanmar, China: Hong Kong)
- Deroca hyalina latizona Watson, 1957 (China: Guangdong, Sichuan, Hunan, Jiangxi, Fujian, Zhejiang)
