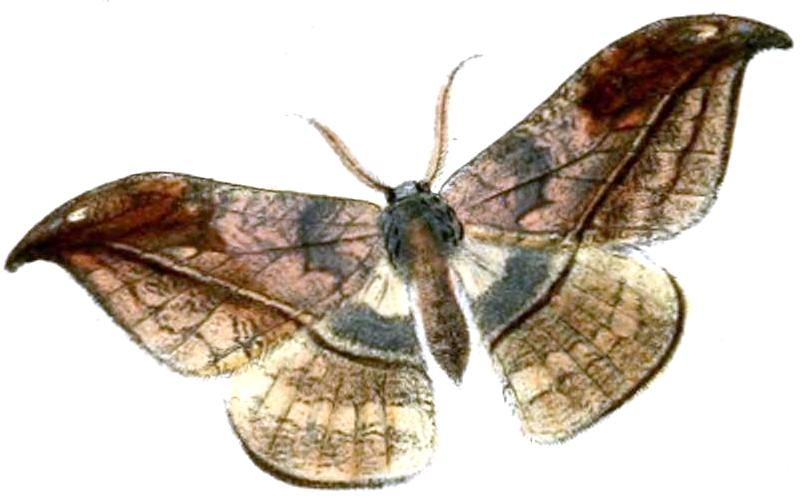

Scientific classification
- Domain: Eukaryota
- Kingdom: Animalia
- Phylum: Arthropoda
- Class: Insecta
- Order: Lepidoptera
- Family: Drepanidae
- Genus: Canucha
- Species: C. duplexa

Binomial name
- Canucha duplexa (Moore, [1866])

Synonyms
- Drepana duplexa Moore, [1866]; Canucha miranda birmana Bryk, 1943

= Canucha duplexa =

Species of hook-tip moth

Canucha duplexa is a moth of the family Drepanidae first described by Frederic Moore in 1866. It is found in India and Myanmar.

== Subspecies ==
- Canucha duplexa duplexa (north-eastern India, Sikkim)
- Canucha duplexa birmana Bryk, 1943 (north-eastern Myanmar)
