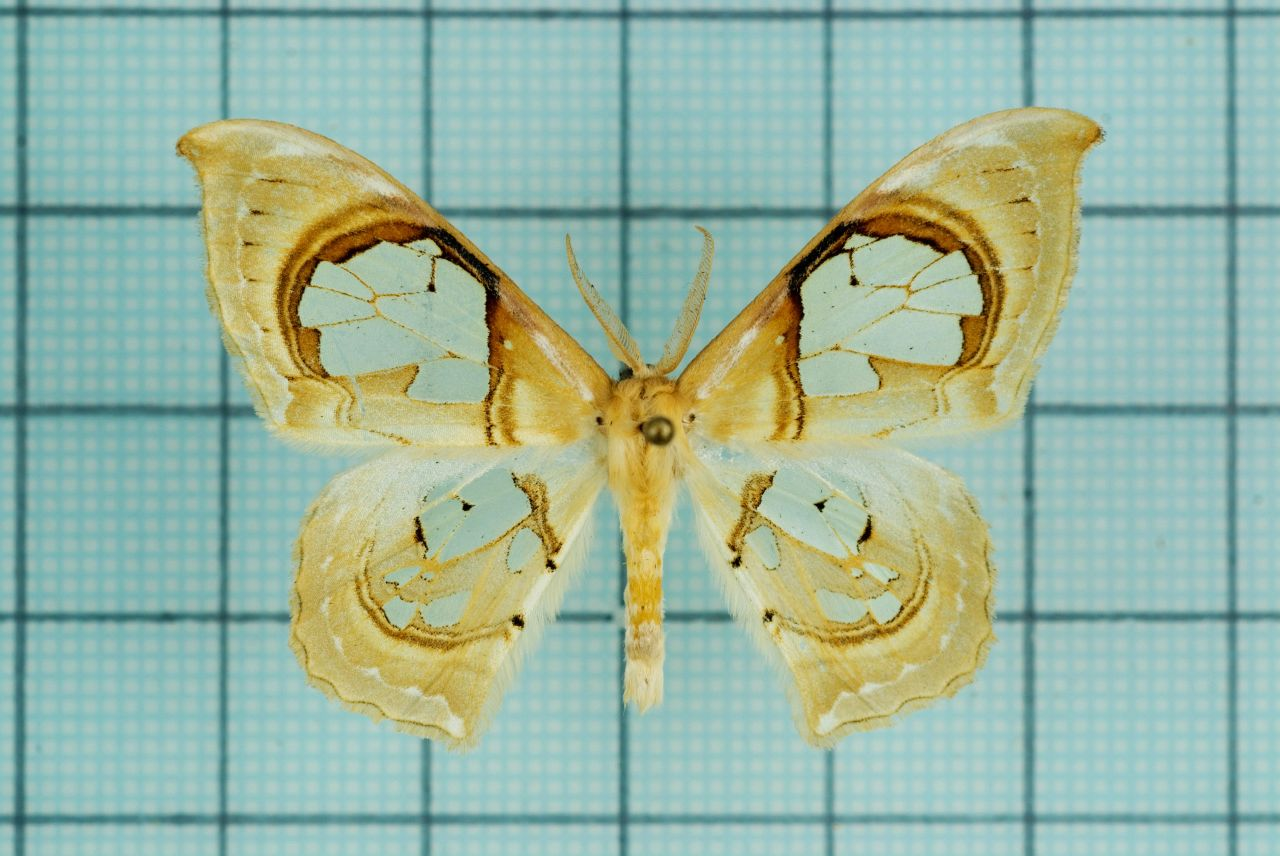
- Macrauzata fenestraria insulata

Scientific classification
- Domain: Eukaryota
- Kingdom: Animalia
- Phylum: Arthropoda
- Class: Insecta
- Order: Lepidoptera
- Family: Drepanidae
- Genus: Macrauzata
- Species: M. fenestraria

Binomial name
- Macrauzata fenestraria (Moore, [1868])

Synonyms
- Comibaena fenestraria Moore, [1868]

= Macrauzata fenestraria =

Species of hook-tip moth

Macrauzata fenestraria is a moth in the family Drepanidae first described by Frederic Moore in 1868. It is found in Taiwan, India and China.

The wingspan is 45–52 mm. Adults are on wing in May.

== Subspecies ==
- Macrauzata fenestraria fenestraria
- Macrauzata fenestraria insulata Inoue, 1988 (Taiwan)
