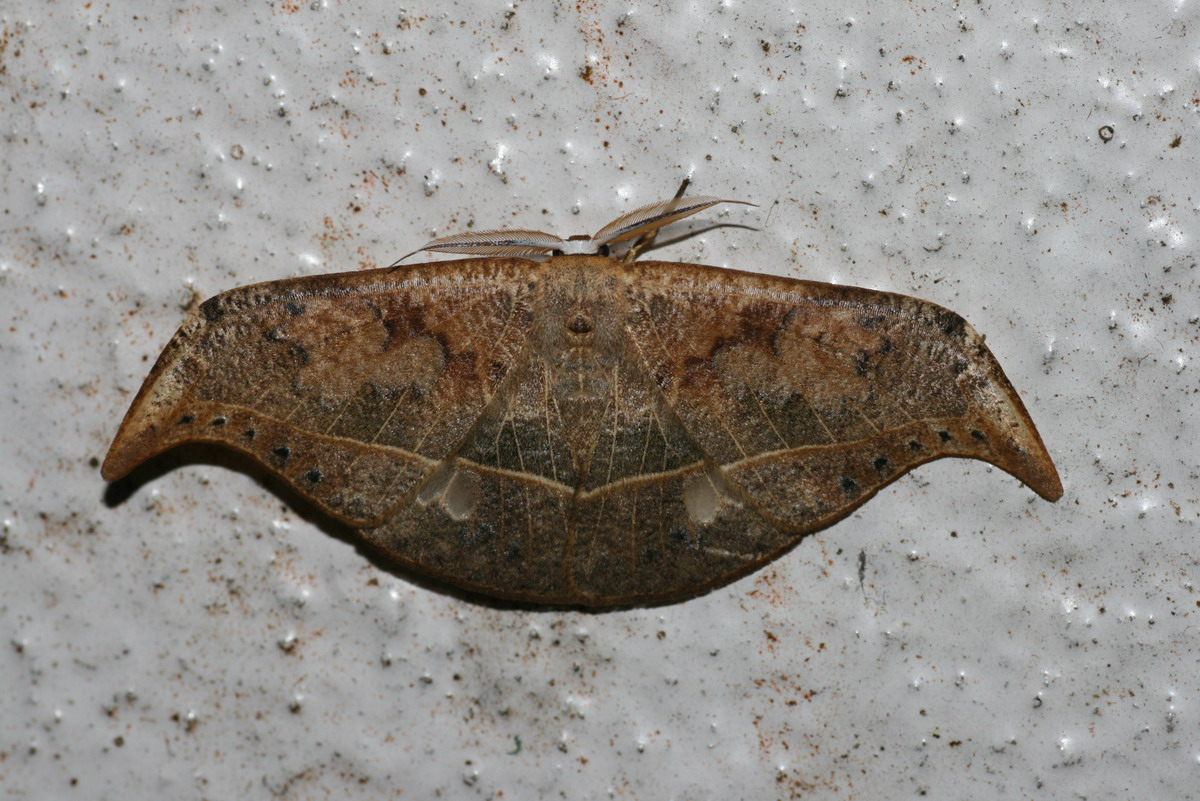

Scientific classification
- Domain: Eukaryota
- Kingdom: Animalia
- Phylum: Arthropoda
- Class: Insecta
- Order: Lepidoptera
- Family: Drepanidae
- Genus: Canucha
- Species: C. specularis

Binomial name
- Canucha specularis (Moore, 1879)

Synonyms
- Drepana specularis Moore, 1879; Platypteryx obtruncata Warren, 1900

= Canucha specularis =

Species of hook-tip moth

Canucha specularis is a moth of the family Drepanidae described by Frederic Moore in 1879. It is found in Hong Kong, India, southern China, Sundaland and Sulawesi.

== Description ==
Head, thorax and abdomen pale ochreous brown. The vertex of the head and shaft of antennae are white. Antennae bipectinated (comb like on both sides) in both sexes, the branches long in the male. Forewings pale ochreous brown. An indistinct antemedial irregular fuscous band. The outer area suffused with fuscous, leaving the veins pale. A pale oblique line from near the apex to inner margin beyond the middle. A submarginal series of black spots present. Hindwings wholly suffused with fuscous, except the base and apex. The oblique line medial. Two hyaline (glass-like) spots present beyond the cell between veins 4 and 6. The submarginal spots indistinct.
