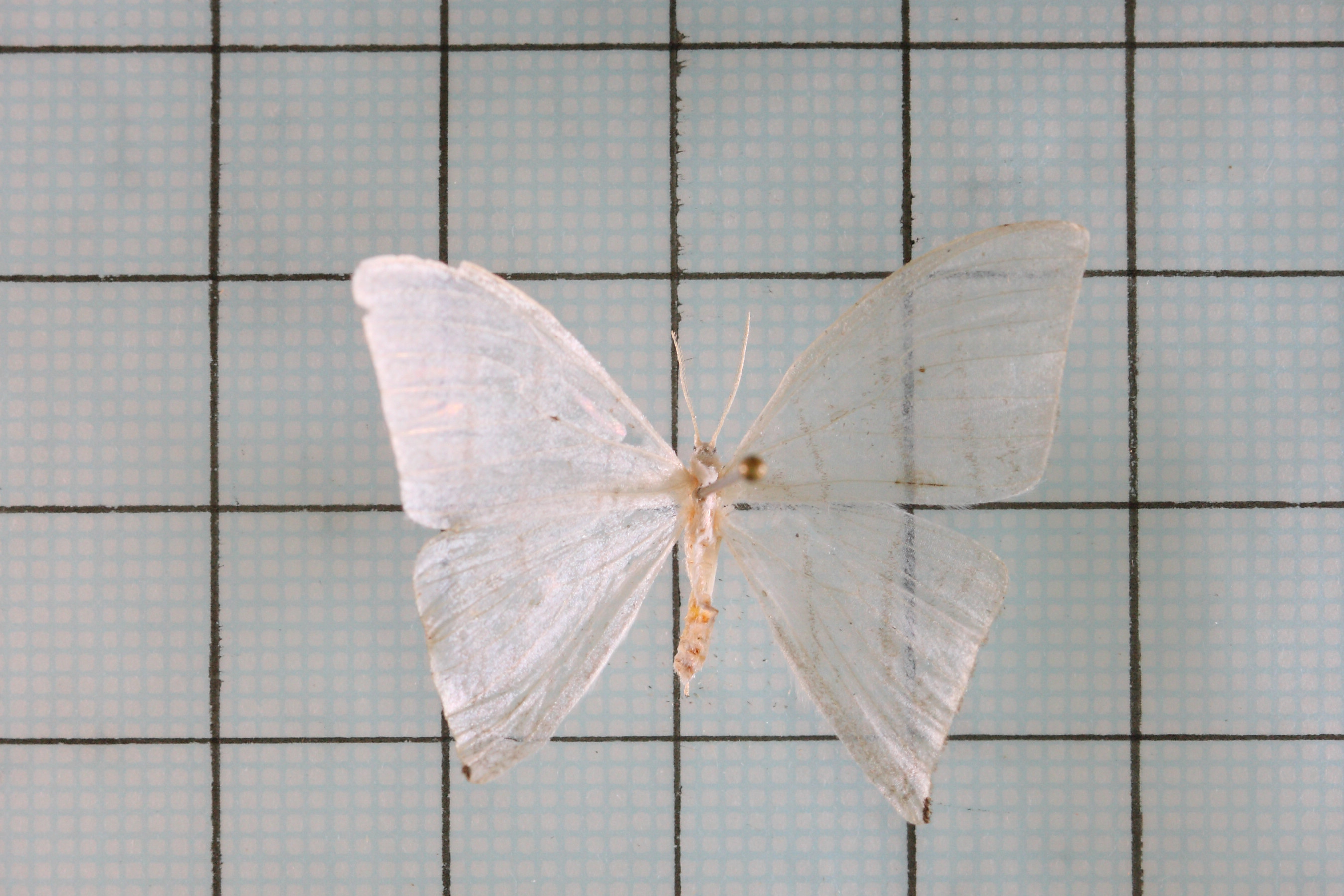

Scientific classification
- Kingdom: Animalia
- Phylum: Arthropoda
- Class: Insecta
- Order: Lepidoptera
- Family: Drepanidae
- Genus: Ditrigona
- Species: D. triangularia

Binomial name
- Ditrigona triangularia (Moore, [1868])

Synonyms
- Ourapteryx triangularia Moore, [1868]; Urapteryx triangularia

= Ditrigona triangularia =

Species of hook-tip moth

Ditrigona triangularia is a moth in the family Drepanidae first described by Frederic Moore in 1868. It is found in the north-eastern Himalayas, China, Taiwan and Thailand.

The wingspan is 27–34 mm. Adults are on wing in March.
