= Ditrigona mytylata =

Scientific classification
- Kingdom: Animalia
- Phylum: Arthropoda
- Class: Insecta
- Order: Lepidoptera
- Family: Drepanidae
- Genus: Ditrigona
- Species: D. mytylata

Binomial name
- Ditrigona mytylata (Guenée, 1868)

Synonyms
- Corycia mytylata Guenée, 1868; Bapta mytylata

Species of hook-tip moth

Ditrigona mytylata is a moth in the family Drepanidae. It was described by Achille Guenée in 1868. It is found in northern India and Myanmar.
