= Thymistadopsis trilinearia =

Scientific classification
- Kingdom: Animalia
- Phylum: Arthropoda
- Clade: Pancrustacea
- Class: Insecta
- Order: Lepidoptera
- Family: Drepanidae
- Genus: Thymistadopsis
- Species: T. trilinearia

Binomial name
- Thymistadopsis trilinearia (Moore, 1867)

Synonyms
- Drepanodes trilinearia Moore, [1868]; Tridrepana trisulcata Warren, 1896; Drepana pulvis Oberthür, 1916

Species of hook-tip moth

Thymistadopsis trilinearia is a moth in the family Drepanidae. It was described by Frederic Moore in 1867. It is found in north-eastern India, Sikkim and Sichuan, China.

The wingspan is about 28 mm. The forewings are whitish, suffused with pale sandy ochreous. The first line runs from the costa to just before the middle. It is whitish, edged with brown at the costa and angled outward on the subcostal and medial veins, incurved in the cell and oblique below the median to the inner margin before the middle. The exterior line is straight and oblique from the inner margin at two-thirds, twice sharply angled beneath the costa. It is whitish and edged inwardly with brown. There is also a fine brown marginal line and the space at either side of the submarginal line is rather darker. The costal apical area is red-brown between the lines. The hindwings are pale ochreous, with traces of alternate pale and ochreous bands along the inner margin.

== Subspecies ==
- Thymistadopsis trilinearia trilinearia (Sikkim, north-eastern India)
- Thymistadopsis trilinearia pulvis (Oberthür, 1916) (China: Sichuan)
