= Ditrigona media =

Scientific classification
- Kingdom: Animalia
- Phylum: Arthropoda
- Clade: Pancrustacea
- Class: Insecta
- Order: Lepidoptera
- Family: Drepanidae
- Genus: Ditrigona
- Species: D. media

Binomial name
- Ditrigona media Wilkinson, 1968

Species of hook-tip moth

Ditrigona media is a moth in the family Drepanidae. It was described by Wilkinson in 1968. It is found in western China and Tibet.
