= Ditrigona sericea =

Scientific classification
- Domain: Eukaryota
- Kingdom: Animalia
- Phylum: Arthropoda
- Class: Insecta
- Order: Lepidoptera
- Family: Drepanidae
- Genus: Ditrigona
- Species: D. sericea

Binomial name
- Ditrigona sericea (Leech, 1898)

Synonyms
- Teldenia sericea Leech, 1898; Drepana fulvicosta Dudgeon, 1899; Peridrepana fulvicosta; Leucodrepana nivea birmanica Bryk, 1943

Species of hook-tip moth

Ditrigona sericea is a moth in the family Drepanidae. It was described by John Henry Leech in 1898. It is found in China, Myanmar and north-eastern India.

The wingspan is 12.5-17.5 mm for males and 15–21 mm for females.
