= Ditrigona obliquilinea =

Scientific classification
- Kingdom: Animalia
- Phylum: Arthropoda
- Class: Insecta
- Order: Lepidoptera
- Family: Drepanidae
- Genus: Ditrigona
- Species: D. obliquilinea

Binomial name
- Ditrigona obliquilinea (Hampson, 1892)

Synonyms
- Leucodrepana obliquilinea Hampson, 1892; Micronia thibetaria Poujade, 1895; Leucodrepana thibetaria; Corycia pnocaria Oberthur, 1923

Species of hook-tip moth

Ditrigona obliquilinea is a moth in the family Drepanidae. It was described by George Hampson in 1892. It is found in Myanmar, India and China.

The wingspan is 13–20 mm for males and 14-20.5 mm for females.

== Subspecies ==
- Ditrigona obliquilinea obliquilinea (Burma, India: Assam, Sikkim, Darjeeling)
- Ditrigona obliquilinea thibetaria Poujade, 1895 (China)
