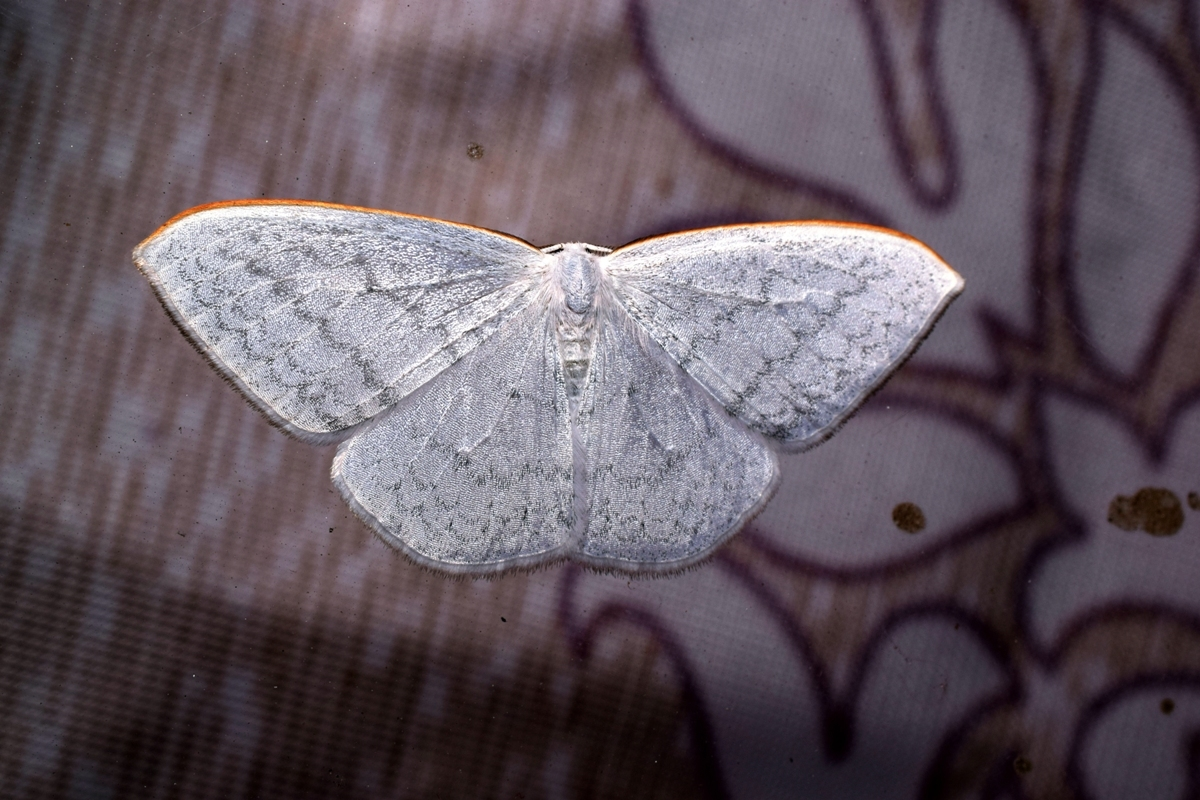

Scientific classification
- Kingdom: Animalia
- Phylum: Arthropoda
- Class: Insecta
- Order: Lepidoptera
- Family: Drepanidae
- Genus: Ditrigona
- Species: D. quinaria

Binomial name
- Ditrigona quinaria (Moore, 1867)

Synonyms
- Drepanodes quinaria Moore, 1867; Leucodrepana nivea Hampson, 1893

= Ditrigona quinaria =

Species of hook-tip moth

Ditrigona quinaria is a moth in the family Drepanidae. It was described by Frederic Moore in 1867. It is found in China, Tibet and India.

The wingspan is 12–17.5 mm for males and 14–18.5 for females.

== Subspecies ==
- Ditrigona quinaria quinaria (Tibet, north-eastern India)
- Ditrigona quinaria erminea Wilkinson, 1968 (China: Shaanxi)
- Ditrigona quinaria leucophaea Wilkinson, 1968 (Tibet)
- Ditrigona quinaria nivea (Hampson, 1893) (India: Assam)
- Ditrigona quinaria spodia Wilkinson, 1968 (China: Yunnan)
