= Ditrigona furvicosta =

Scientific classification
- Kingdom: Animalia
- Phylum: Arthropoda
- Class: Insecta
- Order: Lepidoptera
- Family: Drepanidae
- Genus: Ditrigona
- Species: D. furvicosta

Binomial name
- Ditrigona furvicosta (Hampson, 1911)

Synonyms
- Leucodrepana furvicosta Hampson, 1911

Species of hook-tip moth

Ditrigona furvicosta is a moth in the family Drepanidae. It was described by George Hampson in 1911. It is found in India (Sikkim, Darjeeling), western China and probably Tibet.

The wingspan is 12.5-15.5 mm for males and 15.5 mm for females.
