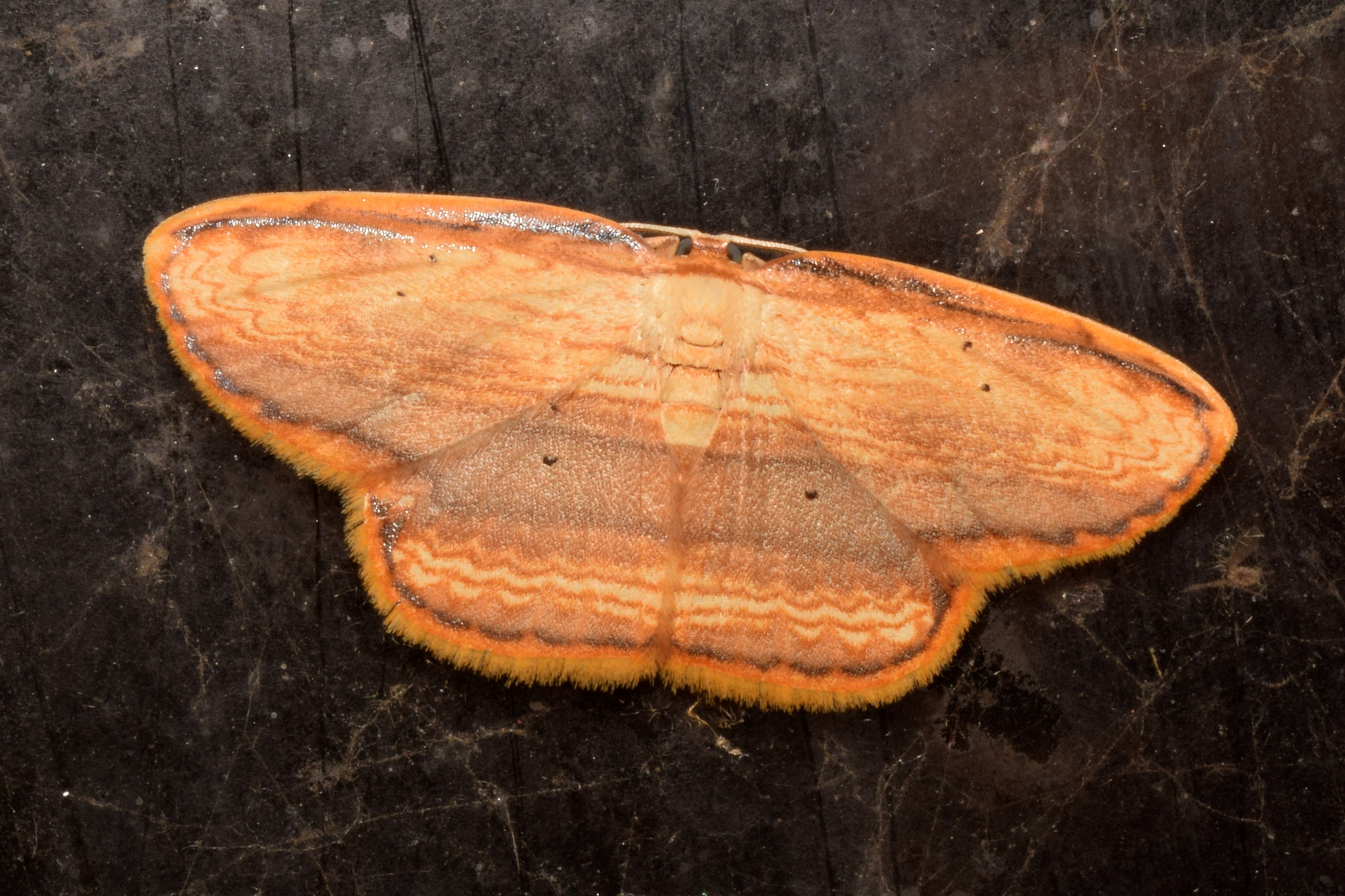

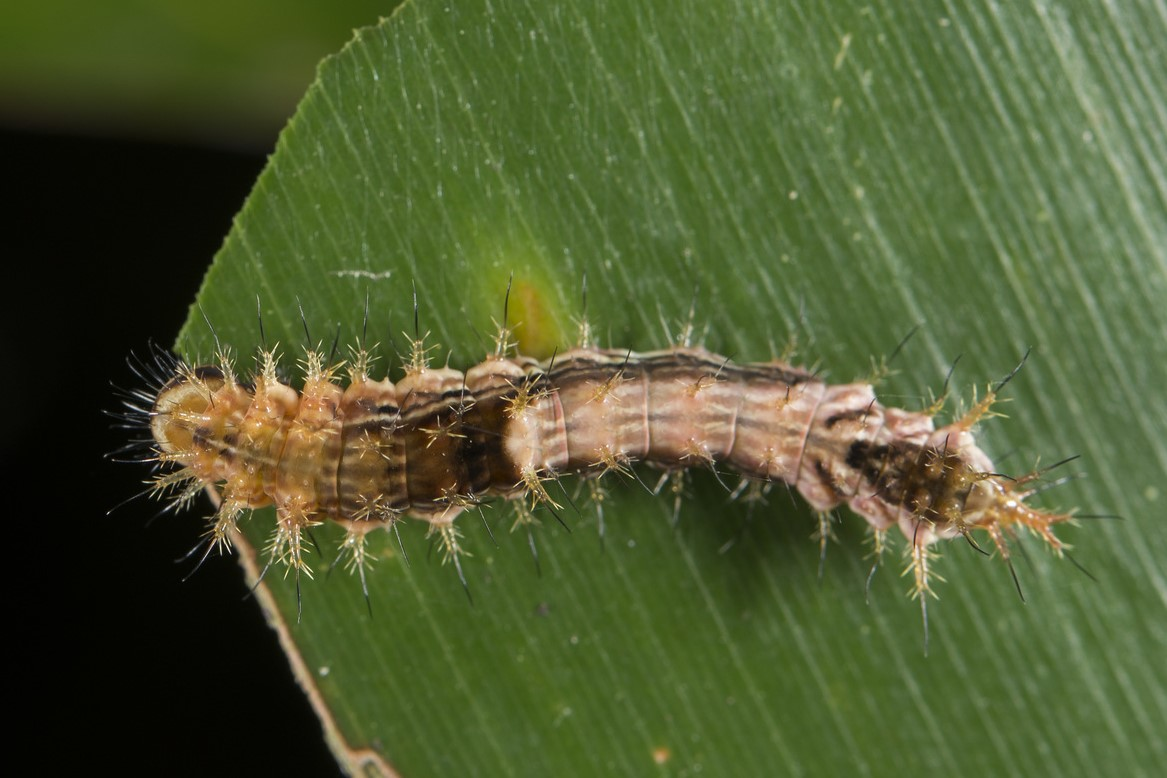
- Adult (top) and larva (bottom)

Scientific classification
- Kingdom: Animalia
- Phylum: Arthropoda
- Clade: Pancrustacea
- Class: Insecta
- Order: Lepidoptera
- Family: Drepanidae
- Genus: Drapetodes
- Species: D. mitaria

Binomial name
- Drapetodes mitaria Guenée, 1857

Synonyms
- Drapetodes mitaria Guenée, 1858; Drapetodes albidior Warren, 1922; Drapetodes vapida Warren, 1922; Drapetodes platycerata Walker, 1862

= Drapetodes mitaria =

Species of hook-tip moth

Drapetodes mitaria is a species of moth in the family Drepanidae. It was first described by Achille Guenée in 1857. It is found in Taiwan, Hong Kong and from India to Singapore.

Adults are on wing in June and July.

The larvae feed on Hedychium species.
