= Ditrigona innotata =

Scientific classification
- Kingdom: Animalia
- Phylum: Arthropoda
- Class: Insecta
- Order: Lepidoptera
- Family: Drepanidae
- Genus: Ditrigona
- Species: D. innotata

Binomial name
- Ditrigona innotata (Hampson, 1892)

Synonyms
- Drepana innotata Hampson, 1893; Peridrepana innotata

Species of hook-tip moth

Ditrigona innotata is a moth in the family Drepanidae. It was described by George Hampson in 1892. It is found in China.

The wingspan is 18 mm for males and 17.5-19.5 mm for females. The forewings and hindwings are uniform white with a few scales.
