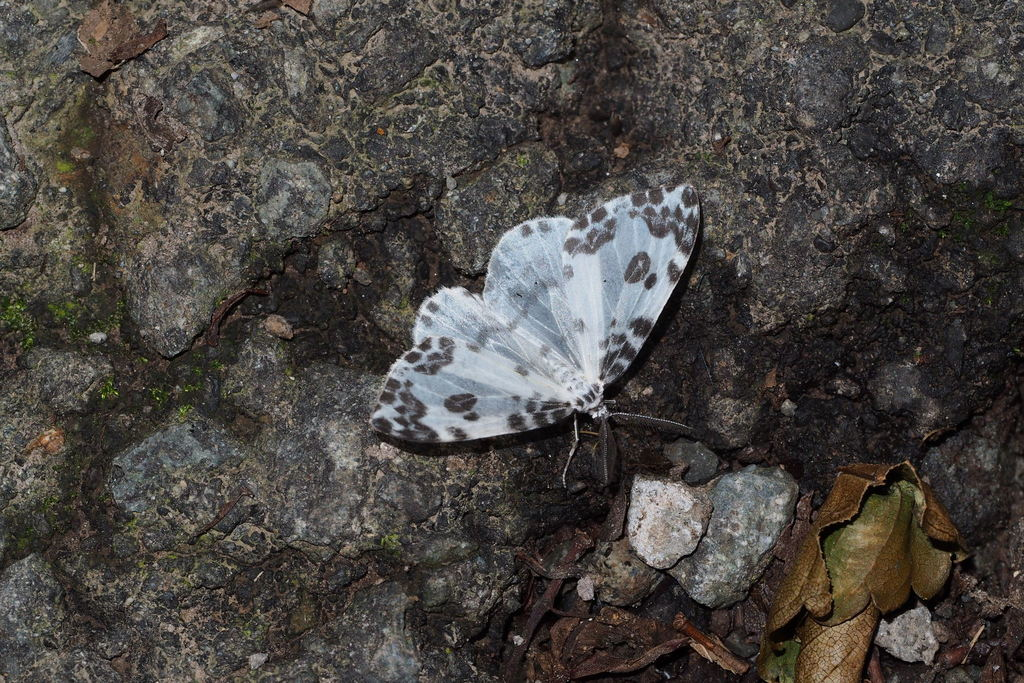

Scientific classification
- Kingdom: Animalia
- Phylum: Arthropoda
- Class: Insecta
- Order: Lepidoptera
- Family: Drepanidae
- Genus: Deroca
- Species: D. inconclusa

Binomial name
- Deroca inconclusa (Walker, 1856)

Synonyms
- Cypra inconclusa Walker, 1856

= Deroca inconclusa =

Species of hook-tip moth

Deroca inconclusa is a moth in the family Drepanidae. It was described by Francis Walker in 1856. It is found in northern India, Myanmar, China (Sichuan, Yunnan, Shensi) and Japan.

The wingspan is 25–35 mm. Adults are white, the wings nearly hyaline (glass like) with two incomplete pale greyish bands. One marginal and the other submarginal. The forewings have three pale greyish spots along the costa and one at the tip of the discal areolet.

== Subspecies ==
- Deroca inconclusa inconclusa (northern India, Myanmar, China: Sichuan, Yunnan)
- Deroca inconclusa carinata Watson, 1957 (China: Shensi)
- Deroca inconclusa phasma Butler, 1878 (Japan)
