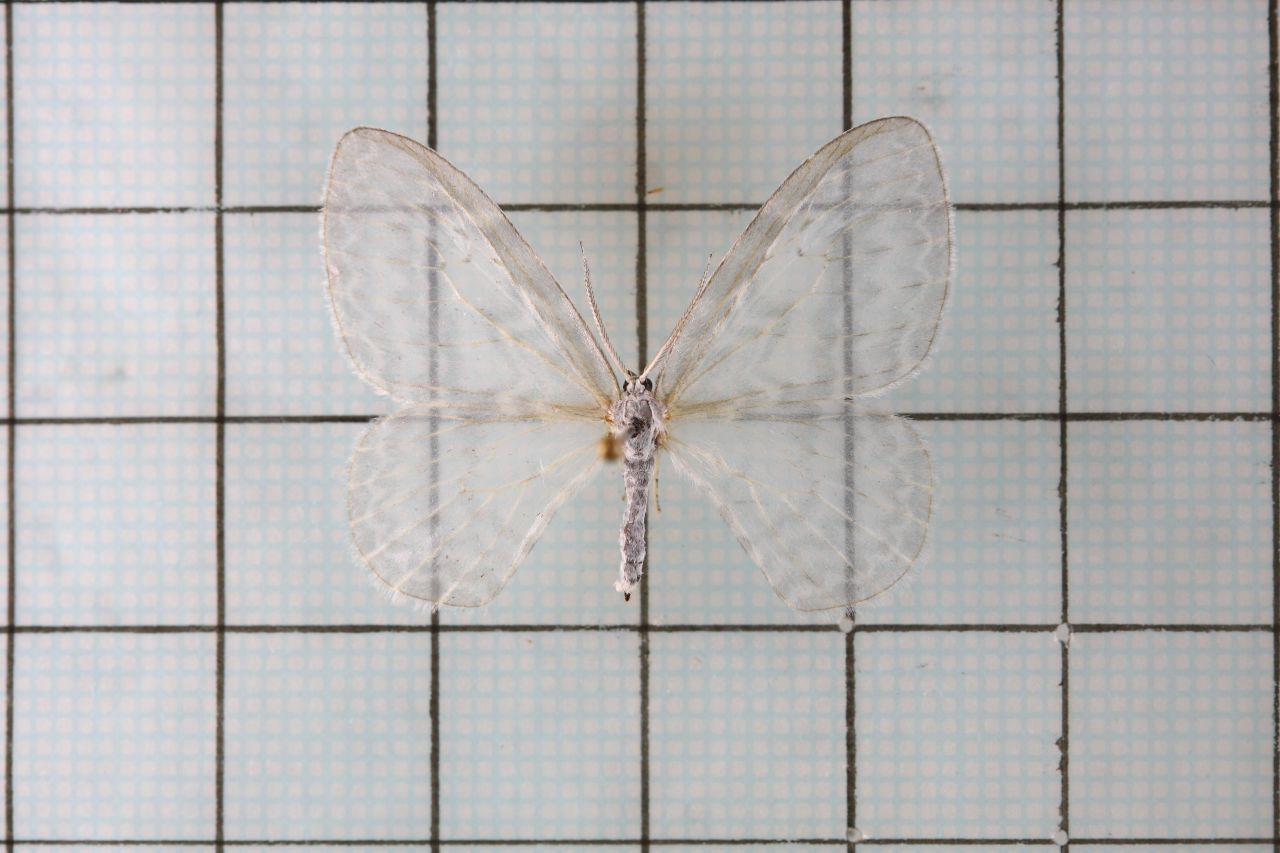
- Deroca hidda ampla

Scientific classification
- Domain: Eukaryota
- Kingdom: Animalia
- Phylum: Arthropoda
- Class: Insecta
- Order: Lepidoptera
- Family: Drepanidae
- Genus: Deroca
- Species: D. hidda

Binomial name
- Deroca hidda Swinhoe, 1900

= Deroca hidda =

Species of hook-tip moth

Deroca hidda is a moth of the family Drepanidae first described by Swinhoe in 1900. It is found in India, Myanmar, China and Taiwan.

== Subspecies ==
- Deroca hidda hidda
- Deroca hidda ampla Inoue, 1988 (Taiwan)
- Deroca hidda bifida Watson, 1957 (northern India, China: northern Yunnan)
