= Thymistadopsis undulifera =

Scientific classification
- Kingdom: Animalia
- Phylum: Arthropoda
- Class: Insecta
- Order: Lepidoptera
- Family: Drepanidae
- Genus: Thymistadopsis
- Species: T. undulifera

Binomial name
- Thymistadopsis undulifera (Hampson, 1900)

Synonyms
- Drepana undulifera Hampson, 1900

Species of hook-tip moth

Thymistadopsis undulifera is a moth in the family Drepanidae. It was described by George Hampson in 1900. It is found in Tibet, China.

The wingspan is about 32 mm. Adults are whitish, suffused with very pale ferruginous, the forewings with crenulated (scalloped) ferruginous antemedial and postmedial lines, the latter very acutely angled below the costa, then oblique. There are dark points at the angles of the cell. The hindwings have a very slight ferruginous tinge and a fine postmedial line from the submedian fold to the inner margin.
