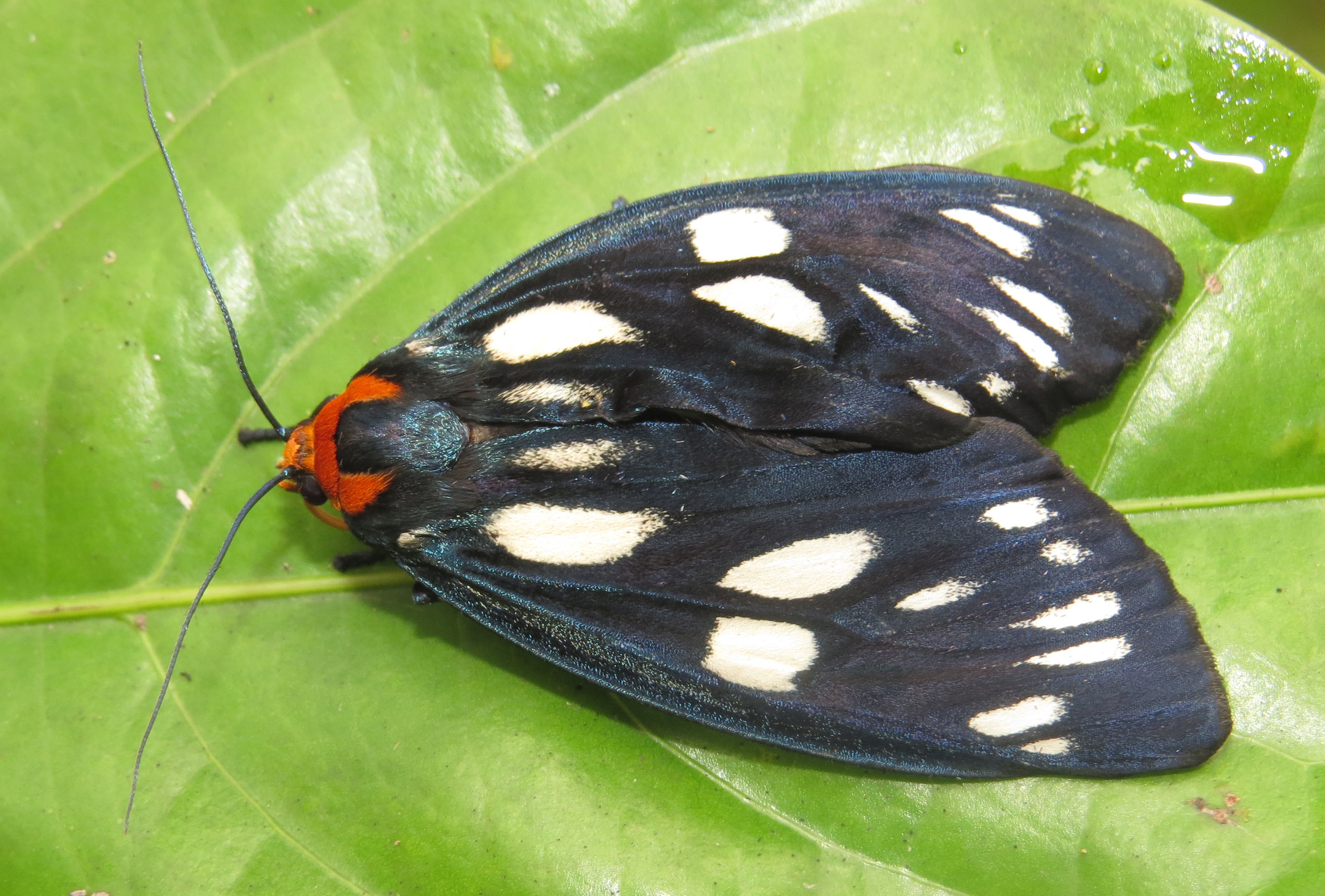
- Macrobrochis gigas

Scientific classification
- Domain: Eukaryota
- Kingdom: Animalia
- Phylum: Arthropoda
- Class: Insecta
- Order: Lepidoptera
- Superfamily: Noctuoidea
- Family: Erebidae
- Subfamily: Arctiinae
- Subtribe: Lithosiina
- Genus: Macrobrochis; Herrich-Schäffer, [1855]

Synonyms
- Isares Herrich-Schäffer, [1858]; Tripura Moore, 1858

= Macrobrochis =

Genus of moths

Macrobrochis is a genus of moths in the subfamily Arctiinae first described by Gottlieb August Wilhelm Herrich-Schäffer in 1855.

== Species ==
- Macrobrochis alba (Fang, 1990)
- Macrobrochis albifascia (Fang, 1982)
- Macrobrochis albovenosa Černý, 1990
- Macrobrochis borneensis Roepke, 1939
- Macrobrochis dirhabdus (Rothschild, 1920)
- Macrobrochis fukiensis (Daniel, 1952)
- Macrobrochis gigas Walker, 1854
- Macrobrochis grahami (Schaus, 1924)
- Macrobrochis hampsoni (Schaus, 1924)
- Macrobrochis holosericea (Hampson, 1901)
- Macrobrochis infernalis Roepke, 1938
- Macrobrochis lucida (Fang, 1990)
- Macrobrochis nigra (Daniel, 1952)
- Macrobrochis nigripes (Hampson, 1900)
- Macrobrochis notabilis Kishida, 1992
- Macrobrochis splendens Butler, 1877
- Macrobrochis tibetensis (Fang, 1990)
- Macrobrochis volzi (Weymer, 1909)

== Former species ==
- Macrobrochis cocciniceps Mabille, 1884
- Macrobrochis pallens Hampson, 1894
- Macrobrochis prasena (Moore, 1859)
- Macrobrochis semirufa Hampson, 1896
- Macrobrochis splendens Butler, 1877
- Macrobrochis staudingeri Alphéraky, 1897
