= Macrobrochis hampsoni =

Scientific classification
- Kingdom: Animalia
- Phylum: Arthropoda
- Class: Insecta
- Order: Lepidoptera
- Superfamily: Noctuoidea
- Family: Erebidae
- Subfamily: Arctiinae
- Genus: Macrobrochis
- Species: M. hampsoni

Binomial name
- Macrobrochis hampsoni (Schaus, 1924)

Synonyms
- Paraona hampsoni Schaus, 1924

Species of moth

Macrobrochis hampsoni is a moth of the subfamily Arctiinae. It was described by William Schaus in 1924. It was moved from Paraona to the genus Macrobrochis in 2024. This taxon has limited recognition in taxonomic databases.

It is known from Mount Emei in Sichuan, China.
