= Macrobrochis grahami =

Scientific classification
- Kingdom: Animalia
- Phylum: Arthropoda
- Class: Insecta
- Order: Lepidoptera
- Superfamily: Noctuoidea
- Family: Erebidae
- Subfamily: Arctiinae
- Genus: Macrobrochis
- Species: M. grahami

Binomial name
- Macrobrochis grahami (Schaus, 1924)

Synonyms
- Paraona grahami Schaus, 1924

Species of moth

Macrobrochis grahami is a moth of the family Erebidae. It was described by William Schaus in 1924. It was moved from Paraona to the genus Macrobrochis in 2024. This taxon has limited recognition in taxonomic databases.

It is known from Mount Emei in Sichuan, China.
