= Agylla =

Agylla may refer to:

- Agylla (moth), a genus of moth in the family Arctiidae
- The Greek name for a city of southern Etruria called Caere in Latin (modern Cerveteri)
- Caere, Inc., a former company acquired in 2000 by Scansoft (later called Nuance Communications)
