= Agylla venosa =

Scientific classification
- Domain: Eukaryota
- Kingdom: Animalia
- Phylum: Arthropoda
- Class: Insecta
- Order: Lepidoptera
- Superfamily: Noctuoidea
- Family: Erebidae
- Subfamily: Arctiinae
- Genus: Agylla
- Species: A. venosa

Binomial name
- Agylla venosa (Schaus, 1894)

Synonyms
- Lithosia venosa Schaus, 1894

Species of moth

Agylla venosa is a moth of the family Erebidae. It was described by William Schaus in 1894. It is found in Paraná, Brazil.
