= Agylla tolteca =

Scientific classification
- Kingdom: Animalia
- Phylum: Arthropoda
- Clade: Pancrustacea
- Class: Insecta
- Order: Lepidoptera
- Superfamily: Noctuoidea
- Family: Erebidae
- Subfamily: Arctiinae
- Genus: Agylla
- Species: A. tolteca

Binomial name
- Agylla tolteca (Schaus, 1889)

Synonyms
- Crambomorpha tolteca Schaus, 1889

Species of moth

Agylla tolteca is a moth of the family Erebidae. It was described by William Schaus in 1889. It is found from Mexico to the Brazilian state of Santa Catarina.

In the male, the head, thorax and abdomen are pale fuscous. Its palpi are ochreous except for tips, antennae, legs and anal tufts. The forewings are silvery white with a yellowish costal edge, inner area suffused with fuscous brown, and a fuscous underside with a large postmedial patch of yellowish scales. The hind wings are dull ochreous.
