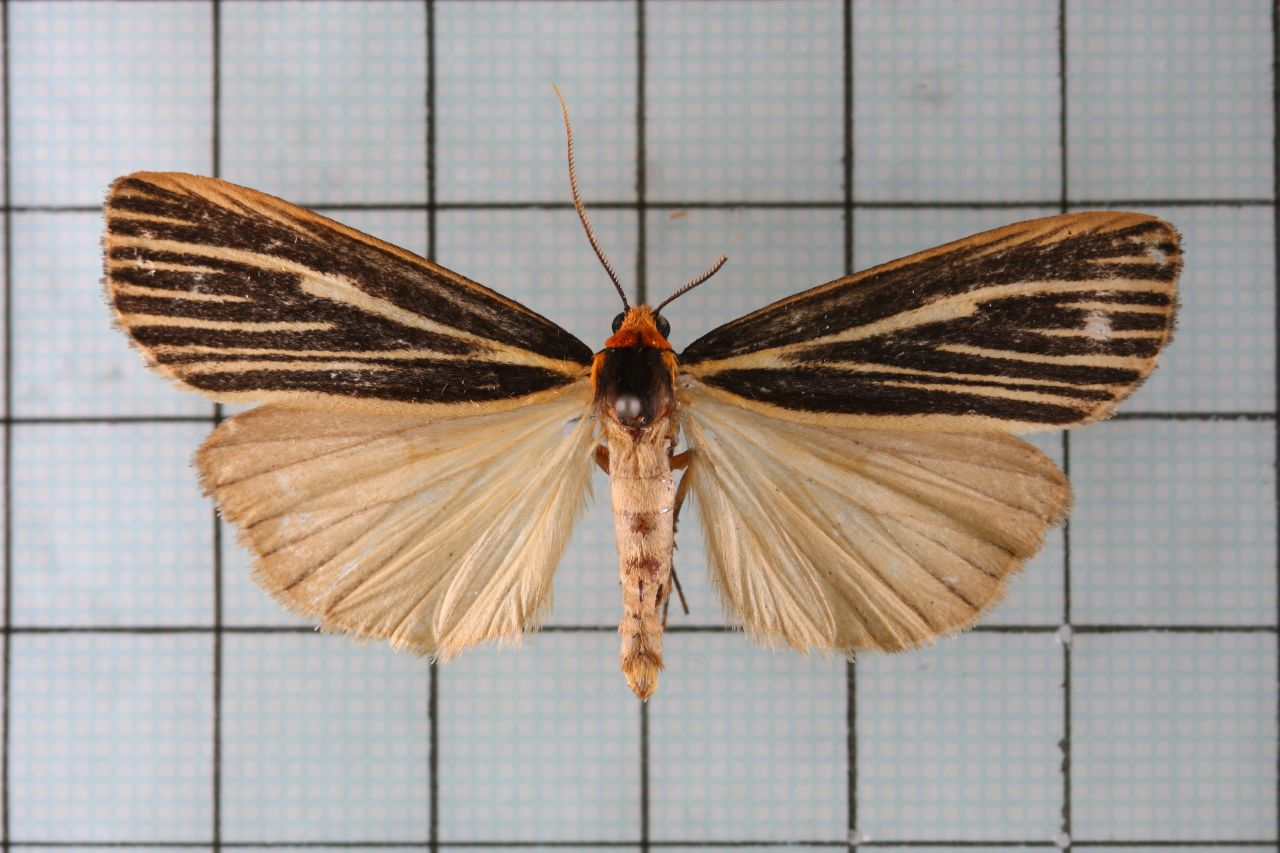

Scientific classification
- Kingdom: Animalia
- Phylum: Arthropoda
- Class: Insecta
- Order: Lepidoptera
- Superfamily: Noctuoidea
- Family: Erebidae
- Subfamily: Arctiinae
- Genus: Agylla
- Species: A. pulchristriata

Binomial name
- Agylla pulchristriata Kishida, 1984

= Agylla pulchristriata =

Species of moth

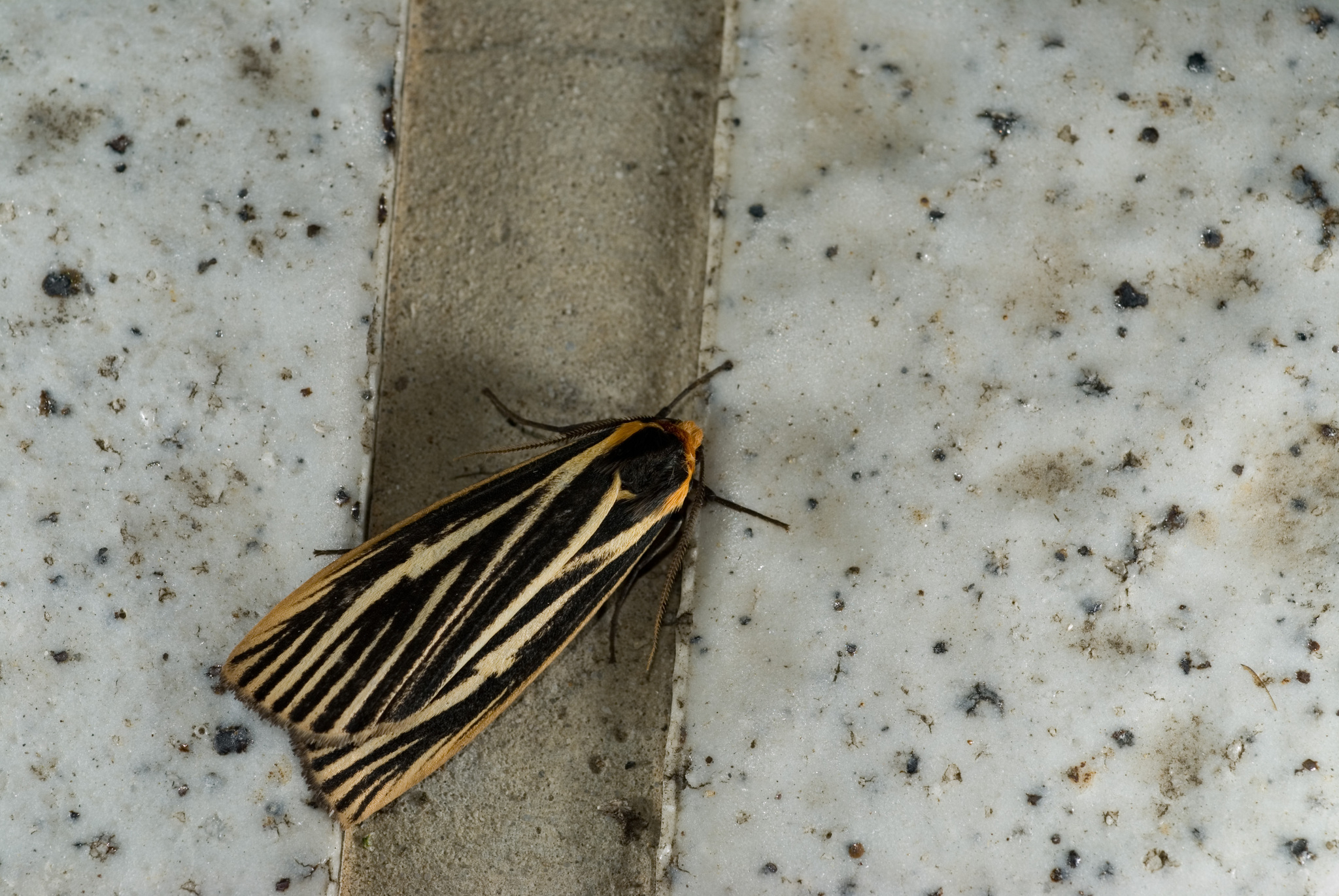

Agylla pulchristriata is a moth of the subfamily Arctiinae first described by Yasunori Kishida in 1984. It is found in Taiwan.
