= Macrobrochis volzi =

Scientific classification
- Domain: Eukaryota
- Kingdom: Animalia
- Phylum: Arthropoda
- Class: Insecta
- Order: Lepidoptera
- Superfamily: Noctuoidea
- Family: Erebidae
- Subfamily: Arctiinae
- Genus: Macrobrochis
- Species: M. volzi

Binomial name
- Macrobrochis volzi (Weymer, 1909)

Synonyms
- Tripura volzi Weymer, 1909

Species of moth

Macrobrochis volzi is a moth of the subfamily Arctiinae. It was described by Weymer in 1909. It is found on Sumatra in Indonesia.
