= Agylla involuta =

Scientific classification
- Kingdom: Animalia
- Phylum: Arthropoda
- Class: Insecta
- Order: Lepidoptera
- Superfamily: Noctuoidea
- Family: Erebidae
- Subfamily: Arctiinae
- Genus: Agylla
- Species: A. involuta

Binomial name
- Agylla involuta Hampson, 1900

Species of moth

Agylla involuta is a moth of the family Erebidae. It was described by George Hampson in 1900. It is found in Rio de Janeiro, Brazil.
