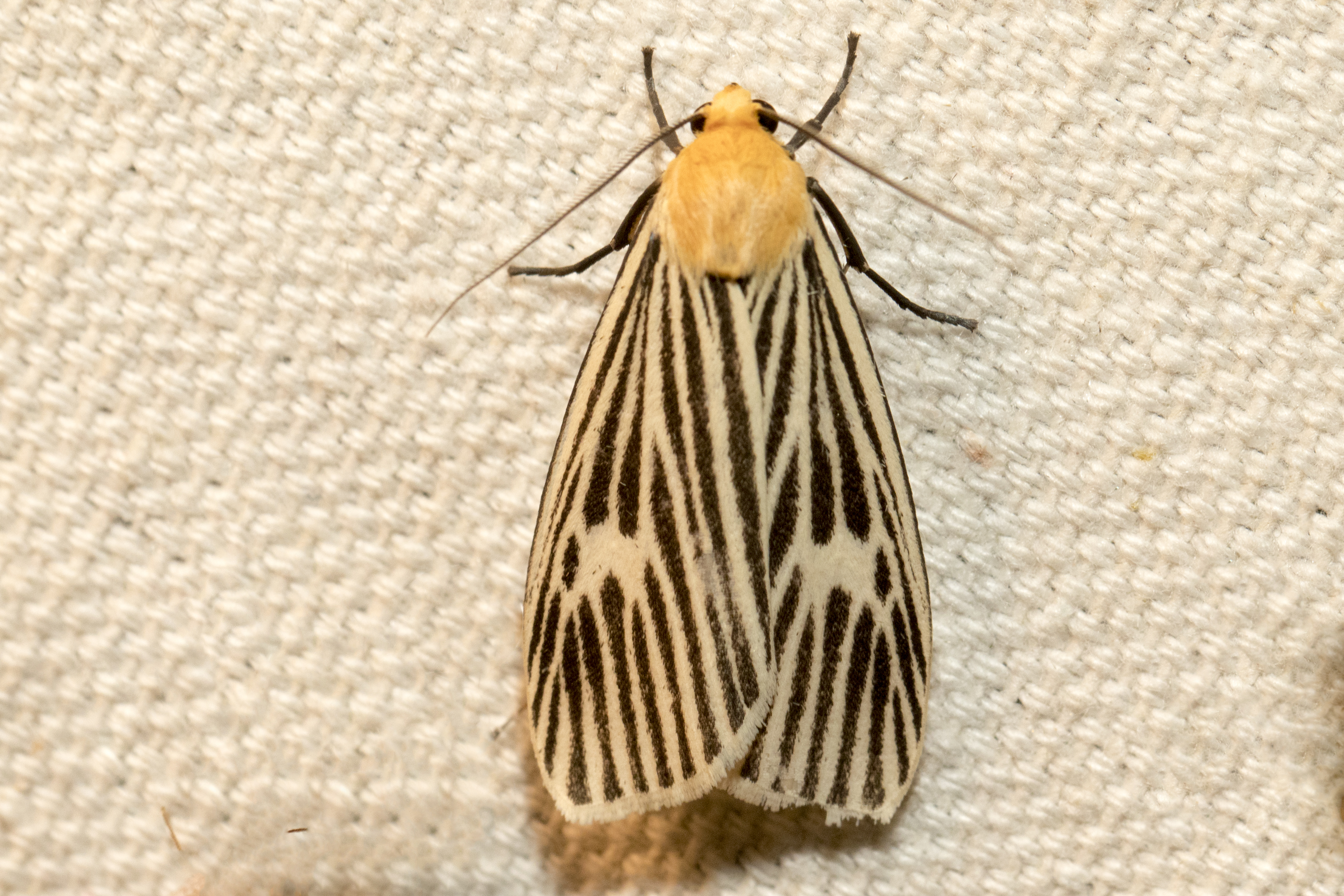

Scientific classification
- Kingdom: Animalia
- Phylum: Arthropoda
- Class: Insecta
- Order: Lepidoptera
- Superfamily: Noctuoidea
- Family: Erebidae
- Subfamily: Arctiinae
- Genus: Macrobrochis
- Species: M. albovenosa

Binomial name
- Macrobrochis albovenosa Černý, 1990

= Macrobrochis albovenosa =

Species of moth

Macrobrochis albovenosa is a moth of the family Erebidae. It was described by Karel Černý in 1990. It is found in Thailand.
