= Macrobrochis nigripes =

Scientific classification
- Kingdom: Animalia
- Phylum: Arthropoda
- Class: Insecta
- Order: Lepidoptera
- Superfamily: Noctuoidea
- Family: Erebidae
- Subfamily: Arctiinae
- Genus: Macrobrochis
- Species: M. nigripes

Binomial name
- Macrobrochis nigripes (Hampson, 1900)

Synonyms
- Ilema nigripes Hampson, 1900; Eilema nigripes (Hampson, 1900)

Species of moth

Macrobrochis nigripes is a moth of the subfamily Arctiinae. It was described by George Hampson in 1900. It is found in the Indian states of Sikkim and Assam.
