= Macrobrochis notabilis =

Scientific classification
- Domain: Eukaryota
- Kingdom: Animalia
- Phylum: Arthropoda
- Class: Insecta
- Order: Lepidoptera
- Superfamily: Noctuoidea
- Family: Erebidae
- Subfamily: Arctiinae
- Genus: Macrobrochis
- Species: M. notabilis

Binomial name
- Macrobrochis notabilis Kishida, 1992

Species of moth

Macrobrochis notabilis is a moth of the family Erebidae. It was described by Yasunori Kishida in 1992. It is found in Thailand.
