= Macrobrochis dirhabdus =

Scientific classification
- Domain: Eukaryota
- Kingdom: Animalia
- Phylum: Arthropoda
- Class: Insecta
- Order: Lepidoptera
- Superfamily: Noctuoidea
- Family: Erebidae
- Subfamily: Arctiinae
- Genus: Macrobrochis
- Species: M. dirhabdus

Binomial name
- Macrobrochis dirhabdus (Rothschild, 1920)

Synonyms
- Agylla dirhabdus Rothschild, 1920

Species of moth

Macrobrochis dirhabdus is a moth of the family Erebidae. It was described by Walter Rothschild in 1920. It is found on Sumatra in Indonesia.
