= Agylla nubens =

Scientific classification
- Domain: Eukaryota
- Kingdom: Animalia
- Phylum: Arthropoda
- Class: Insecta
- Order: Lepidoptera
- Superfamily: Noctuoidea
- Family: Erebidae
- Subfamily: Arctiinae
- Genus: Agylla
- Species: A. nubens

Binomial name
- Agylla nubens (Schaus, 1899)

Synonyms
- Crambomorpha nubens Schaus, 1899

Species of moth

Agylla nubens is a moth of the family Erebidae. It was described by William Schaus in 1899. It is found in Mexico.
