= Agylla metaxantha =

Scientific classification
- Kingdom: Animalia
- Phylum: Arthropoda
- Class: Insecta
- Order: Lepidoptera
- Superfamily: Noctuoidea
- Family: Erebidae
- Subfamily: Arctiinae
- Genus: Agylla
- Species: A. metaxantha

Binomial name
- Agylla metaxantha (Hampson, 1895)

Synonyms
- Macrobrochis metaxantha Hampson, 1895

Species of moth

Agylla metaxantha is a moth of the family Erebidae. It was described by George Hampson in 1895. It can be found in Bhutan.
