= Agylla flavitincta =

Scientific classification
- Domain: Eukaryota
- Kingdom: Animalia
- Phylum: Arthropoda
- Class: Insecta
- Order: Lepidoptera
- Superfamily: Noctuoidea
- Family: Erebidae
- Subfamily: Arctiinae
- Genus: Agylla
- Species: A. flavitincta

Binomial name
- Agylla flavitincta Dognin, 1899

Species of moth

Agylla flavitincta is a moth of the family Erebidae. It was described by Paul Dognin in 1899. It is found in Ecuador.
