= Agylla postfusca =

Scientific classification
- Kingdom: Animalia
- Phylum: Arthropoda
- Class: Insecta
- Order: Lepidoptera
- Superfamily: Noctuoidea
- Family: Erebidae
- Subfamily: Arctiinae
- Genus: Agylla
- Species: A. postfusca

Binomial name
- Agylla postfusca (Hampson, 1894)

Synonyms
- Gnophria postfusca Hampson, 1894; Ghoria postfusca (Hampson, 1894)

Species of moth

Agylla postfusca is a moth of the subfamily Arctiinae. It was described by George Hampson in 1894. It is found in the north-western Himalayas of India.
