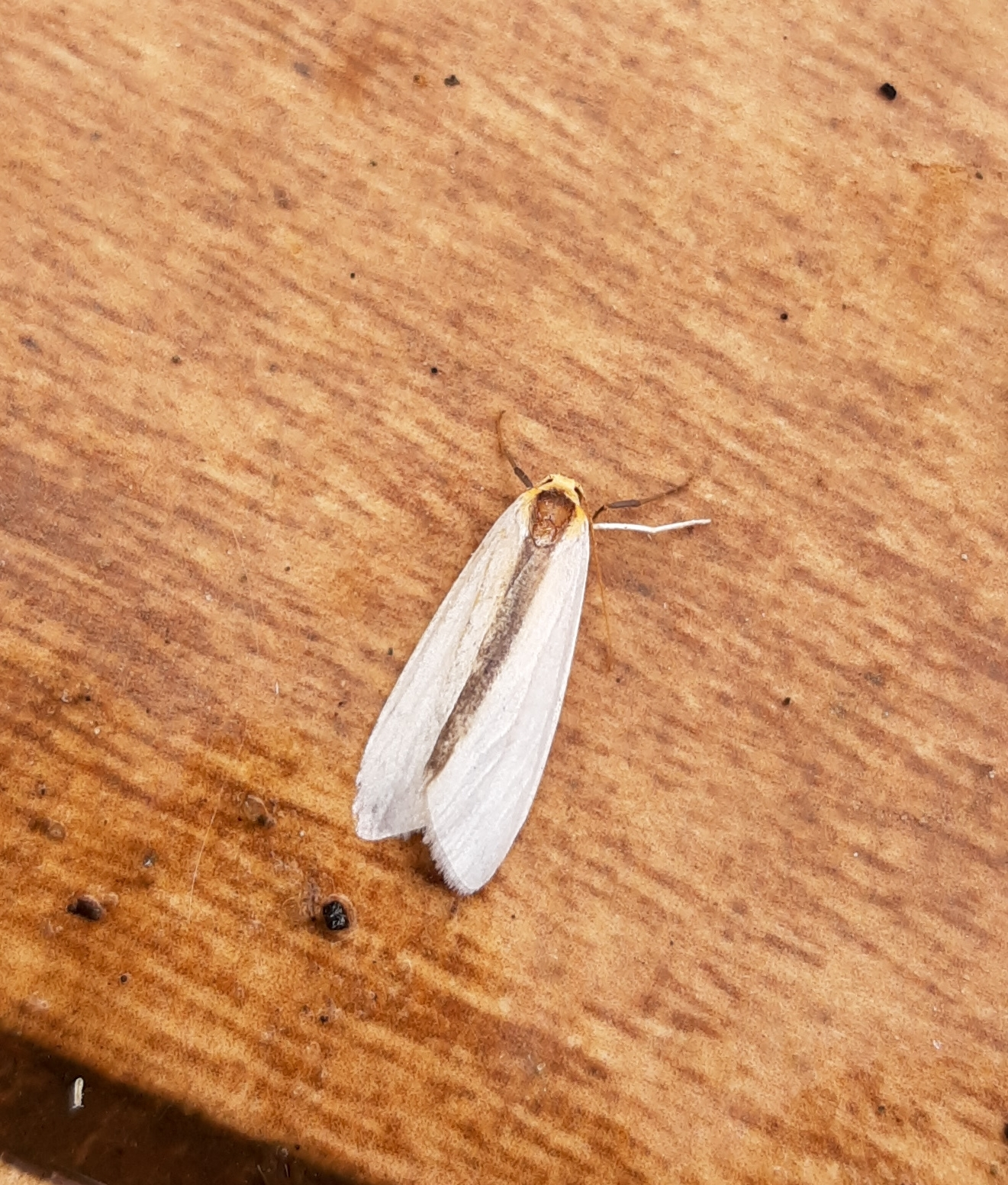

Scientific classification
- Domain: Eukaryota
- Kingdom: Animalia
- Phylum: Arthropoda
- Class: Insecta
- Order: Lepidoptera
- Superfamily: Noctuoidea
- Family: Erebidae
- Subfamily: Arctiinae
- Genus: Agylla
- Species: A. separata

Binomial name
- Agylla separata (Schaus, 1894)

Synonyms
- Choria separata Schaus, 1894

= Agylla separata =

Species of moth

Agylla separata is a moth of the family Erebidae. It was described by William Schaus in 1894. It is found in Panama, Bolivia, Colombia and the Brazilian states of São Paulo and Paraná.
