= Agylla fasciculata =

Scientific classification
- Kingdom: Animalia
- Phylum: Arthropoda
- Class: Insecta
- Order: Lepidoptera
- Superfamily: Noctuoidea
- Family: Erebidae
- Subfamily: Arctiinae
- Genus: Agylla
- Species: A. fasciculata

Binomial name
- Agylla fasciculata Walker, 1854

Species of moth

Agylla fasciculata is a moth of the family Erebidae. It was described by Francis Walker in 1854. It is found in Venezuela.
