= Agylla umbrifera =

Scientific classification
- Domain: Eukaryota
- Kingdom: Animalia
- Phylum: Arthropoda
- Class: Insecta
- Order: Lepidoptera
- Superfamily: Noctuoidea
- Family: Erebidae
- Subfamily: Arctiinae
- Genus: Agylla
- Species: A. umbrifera

Binomial name
- Agylla umbrifera (Felder, 1874)

Synonyms
- Crambomorpha umbrifera Felder, 1874

Species of moth

Agylla umbrifera is a moth of the family Erebidae. It was described by Felder in 1874. It is found in Colombia, Venezuela and Bolivia.
