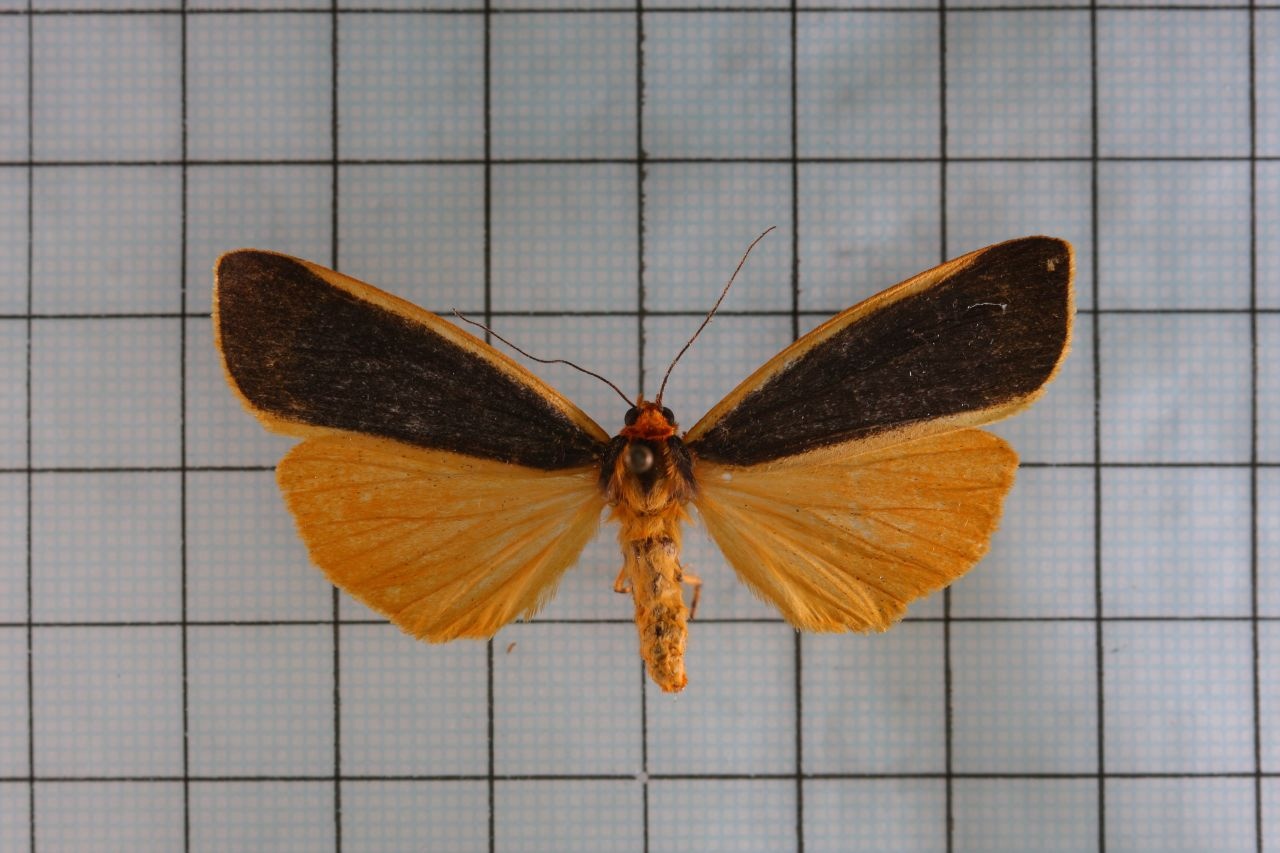

Scientific classification
- Domain: Eukaryota
- Kingdom: Animalia
- Phylum: Arthropoda
- Class: Insecta
- Order: Lepidoptera
- Superfamily: Noctuoidea
- Family: Erebidae
- Subfamily: Arctiinae
- Genus: Agylla
- Species: A. virago

Binomial name
- Agylla virago Rothschild, 1913

Synonyms
- Churinga virago

= Agylla virago =

Species of moth

Agylla virago is a moth of the family Erebidae first described by Walter Rothschild in 1913. It is found in Taiwan.

The wingspan is 46–58 mm.
