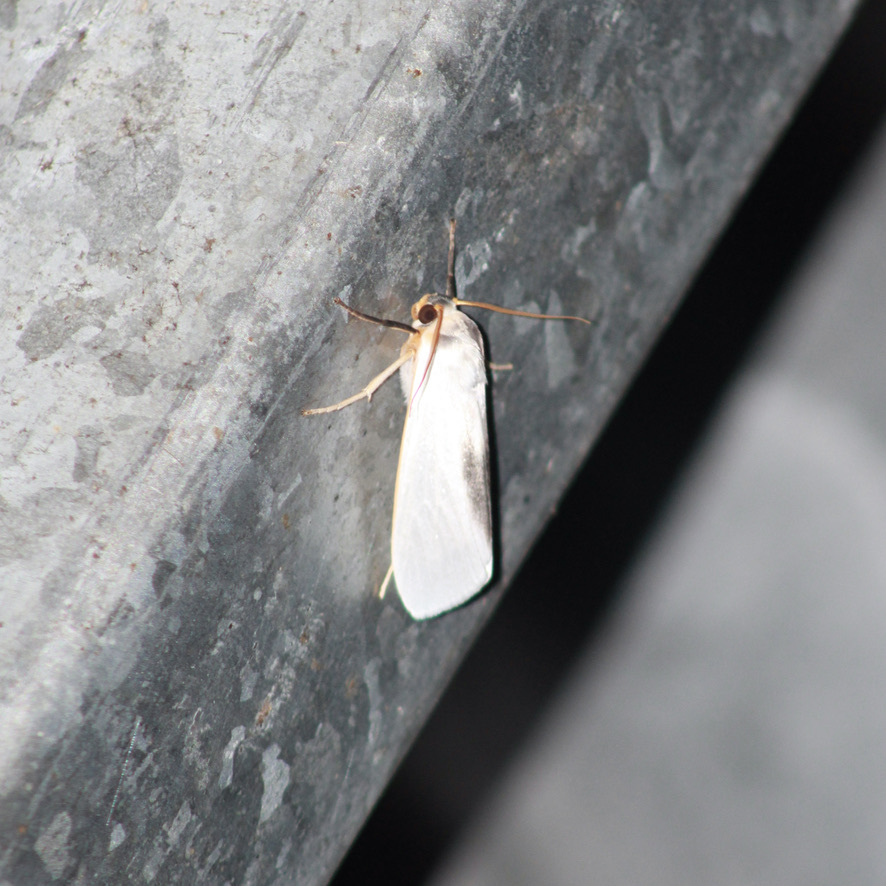

Scientific classification
- Kingdom: Animalia
- Phylum: Arthropoda
- Clade: Pancrustacea
- Class: Insecta
- Order: Lepidoptera
- Superfamily: Noctuoidea
- Family: Erebidae
- Subfamily: Arctiinae
- Genus: Agylla
- Species: A. argentifera

Binomial name
- Agylla argentifera (Walker, 1866)

Synonyms
- Halesidota argentifera Walker, 1866

= Agylla argentifera =

Species of moth

Agylla argentifera is a moth of the family Erebidae. It was described by Francis Walker in 1866. It is found in Mexico, Costa Rica, Venezuela and Brazil.
