= Agylla asakurana =

Scientific classification
- Kingdom: Animalia
- Phylum: Arthropoda
- Clade: Pancrustacea
- Class: Insecta
- Order: Lepidoptera
- Superfamily: Noctuoidea
- Family: Erebidae
- Subfamily: Arctiinae
- Genus: Agylla
- Species: A. asakurana

Binomial name
- Agylla asakurana (Matsumura, 1931)

Species of moth

Agylla asakurana is a moth of the subfamily Arctiinae. It was described by Shōnen Matsumura in 1931. It is found in Taiwan.
