= Macrobrochis alba =

Scientific classification
- Kingdom: Animalia
- Phylum: Arthropoda
- Clade: Pancrustacea
- Class: Insecta
- Order: Lepidoptera
- Superfamily: Noctuoidea
- Family: Erebidae
- Subfamily: Arctiinae
- Genus: Macrobrochis
- Species: M. alba

Binomial name
- Macrobrochis alba (Fang, 1990)

Synonyms
- Paraona alba Fang, 1990

Species of moth

Macrobrochis alba is a moth of the family Erebidae. It was described by Fang in 1990. It is found in Yunnan, China.
