= Agylla marginata =

Scientific classification
- Domain: Eukaryota
- Kingdom: Animalia
- Phylum: Arthropoda
- Class: Insecta
- Order: Lepidoptera
- Superfamily: Noctuoidea
- Family: Erebidae
- Subfamily: Arctiinae
- Genus: Agylla
- Species: A. marginata

Binomial name
- Agylla marginata (H. Druce, 1885)

Synonyms
- Areva marginata H. Druce, 1885

Species of moth

Agylla marginata is a moth of the family Erebidae. It was described by Herbert Druce in 1885. It is found in Mexico, Guatemala and Costa Rica.
