= Agylla nivea =

Scientific classification
- Kingdom: Animalia
- Phylum: Arthropoda
- Class: Insecta
- Order: Lepidoptera
- Superfamily: Noctuoidea
- Family: Erebidae
- Subfamily: Arctiinae
- Genus: Agylla
- Species: A. nivea

Binomial name
- Agylla nivea (Walker, 1856)

Synonyms
- Lithosia nivea Walker, 1856; Halesidota monoleuca Walker, 1866; Crambomorpha argentea Felder, 1874; Crambomorpha virginea Schaus, 1894; Macrocrambus plateada Dognin, 1894; Macrocrambus florecilla Dognin, 1894

Species of moth

Agylla nivea is a moth of the family Erebidae, described by Francis Walker in 1856, that lives in Mexico, Guatemala, Costa Rica, Panama, Colombia, Brazil (São Paulo, Espritu Santo, Paraña), Ecuador and Bolivia.
