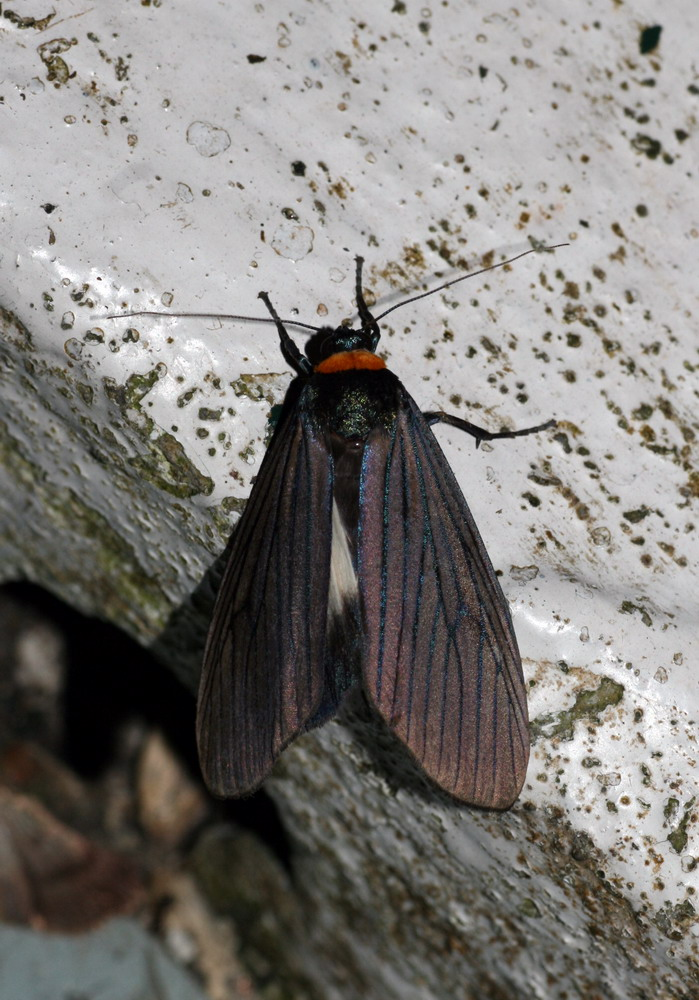

Scientific classification
- Domain: Eukaryota
- Kingdom: Animalia
- Phylum: Arthropoda
- Class: Insecta
- Order: Lepidoptera
- Superfamily: Noctuoidea
- Family: Erebidae
- Subfamily: Arctiinae
- Genus: Macrobrochis
- Species: M. borneensis

Binomial name
- Macrobrochis borneensis Roepke, 1939

= Macrobrochis borneensis =

Species of moth

Macrobrochis borneensis is a moth of the family Erebidae. It was described by Walter Karl Johann Roepke in 1939. It is found on Borneo and Peninsular Malaysia, and possibly Java and the Philippines.

Adults are grey with an orange collar and a broad white zone on the hindwings.
