= Agylla sericea =

Scientific classification
- Kingdom: Animalia
- Phylum: Arthropoda
- Clade: Pancrustacea
- Class: Insecta
- Order: Lepidoptera
- Superfamily: Noctuoidea
- Family: Erebidae
- Subfamily: Arctiinae
- Genus: Agylla
- Species: A. sericea

Binomial name
- Agylla sericea (H. Druce, 1885)

Synonyms
- Crambomorpha sericea H. Druce, 1885; Mieza galactina Maassen, 1890; Gnophria limpida Möschler, 1890; Crambidia petrola Schaus, 1894

Species of moth

Agylla sericea is a species of moth in the family Erebidae. It was first described by Herbert Druce in 1885. It is found in Mexico, Guatemala, Puerto Rico, Colombia, Brazil, Bolivia and Peru.
