= Macrobrochis infernalis =

Scientific classification
- Domain: Eukaryota
- Kingdom: Animalia
- Phylum: Arthropoda
- Class: Insecta
- Order: Lepidoptera
- Superfamily: Noctuoidea
- Family: Erebidae
- Subfamily: Arctiinae
- Genus: Macrobrochis
- Species: M. infernalis

Binomial name
- Macrobrochis infernalis Roepke, 1938

Species of moth

Macrobrochis infernalis is a moth of the family Erebidae. It was described by Walter Karl Johann Roepke in 1938. It is found on Sulawesi in Indonesia.
