= Agylla maasseni =

Scientific classification
- Domain: Eukaryota
- Kingdom: Animalia
- Phylum: Arthropoda
- Class: Insecta
- Order: Lepidoptera
- Superfamily: Noctuoidea
- Family: Erebidae
- Subfamily: Arctiinae
- Genus: Agylla
- Species: A. maasseni

Binomial name
- Agylla maasseni (Dognin, 1894)

Synonyms
- Crambomorpha maasseni Dognin, 1894; Lithosia argentea Maassen, 1890

Species of moth

Agylla maasseni is a moth of the family Erebidae. It was described by Paul Dognin in 1894. It is found in Panama, Colombia, Venezuela and Ecuador.
