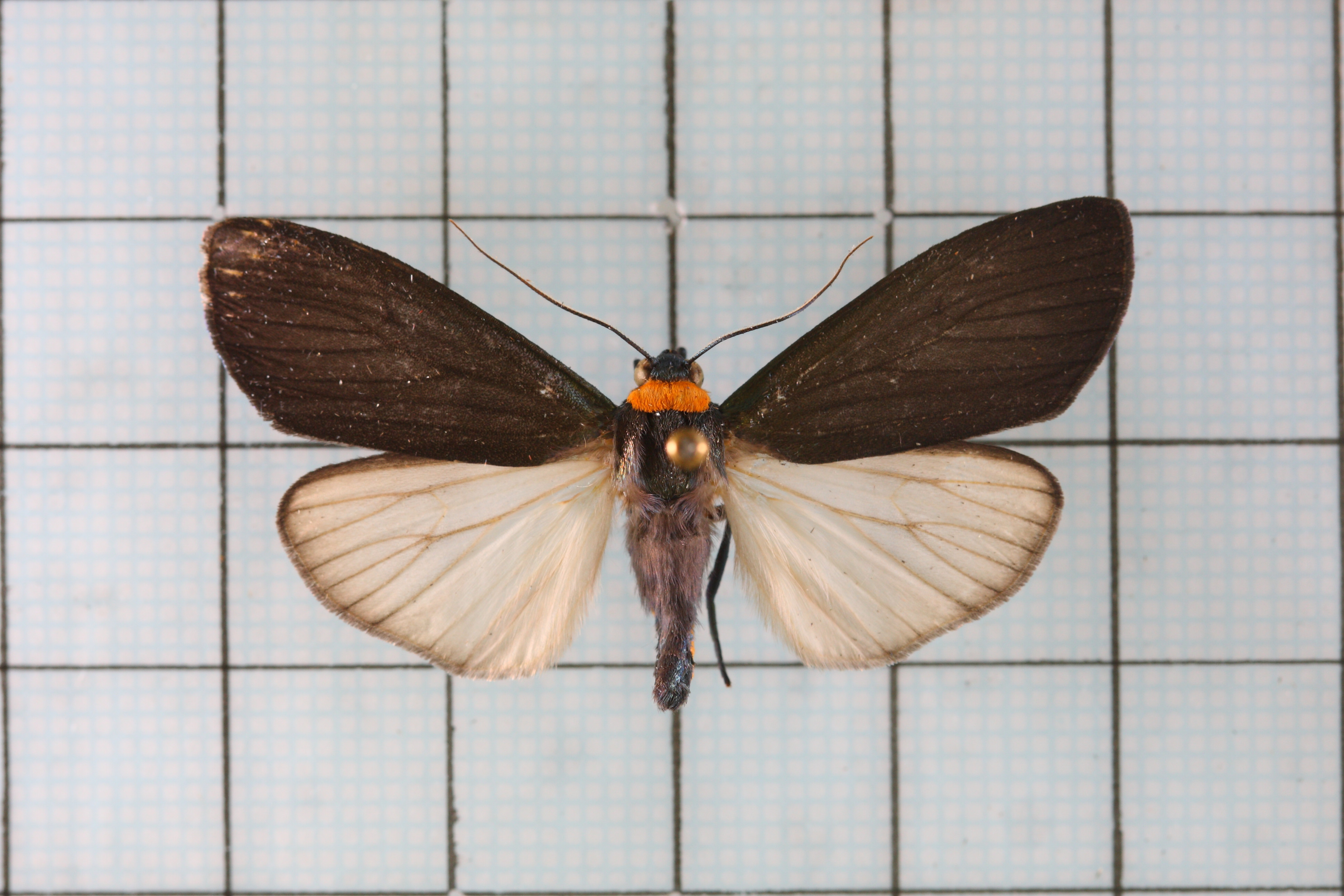
- Paraona staudingeri formosana

Scientific classification
- Domain: Eukaryota
- Kingdom: Animalia
- Phylum: Arthropoda
- Class: Insecta
- Order: Lepidoptera
- Superfamily: Noctuoidea
- Family: Erebidae
- Subfamily: Arctiinae
- Subtribe: Lithosiina
- Genus: Paraona; Moore, 1878

= Paraona =

Genus of moths

Paraona is a disputed genus of moths in the family Erebidae, considered synonymous to Macrobrochis by some but not all lepidopterists.

== Taxonomy and status ==
Paraona was erected by Frederic Moore in 1878 around the species originally described as Crambomorpha splendens by Arthur Gardiner Butler in 1877. Sergei Alphéraky described an additional species, Paraona staudingeri, in 1897.

In 1993, the genus—at the time placed to family Arctiidae (Note: Since reclassified as subfamily Arctiinae within the Erebidae)—was deemed a junior synonym of Macrobrochis by Yasunori Kishida. This synonymization was based upon the strong likeness of the male genitalia of Paraona staudingeri to those of Macrobrochis gigas, and explicitly did not involve examination of the type species of Paraona. This classification was subsequently followed by Jeremy Daniel Holloway in 2001 in Part 7 of his book series The Moths of Borneo.

In 2012, the genus was restored by Vladimir Dubatolov, Kishida and Min Wang, based on dissimilarity of the male genitalia of Paraona's type species, Crambomorpha splendens, to those of Macrobrochis. Following the restoration of the genus, it was once more treated as valid by subsequent authors.

In 2024, the genus was once again synonymized with Macrobrochis, this time by Anton Volynkin, who stated that the 2012 restoration of the genus was based on a specimen held by Museum Witt Munich "identified by an unknown identifier as 'Paraona splendens'" and which is "dissimilar to the illustrations of P. splendens" by both the generic taxon author Frederic Moore and those by George Hampson. He concluded the specimen, rather than represent Paraona splendens, was instead a different, previously undescribed species he named Murmyshia obscuria.

== Selected species ==
- Paraona staudingeri Alphéraky, 1897

== Former species ==
These were moved by Anton V. Volynkin in 2024

- Paraona bicolor Toulgoët, 1968 now Eilema bicolor
- Paraona cocciniceps (Mabille, 1884) now Eilema cocciniceps
- Paraona interjecta Strand, 1912 now Ilemodes interjecta
- Paraona micans (Pagenstecher, 1895) now Murmyshia micans
- Paraona splendens (Butler, 1877) now Macrobrochis splendens
