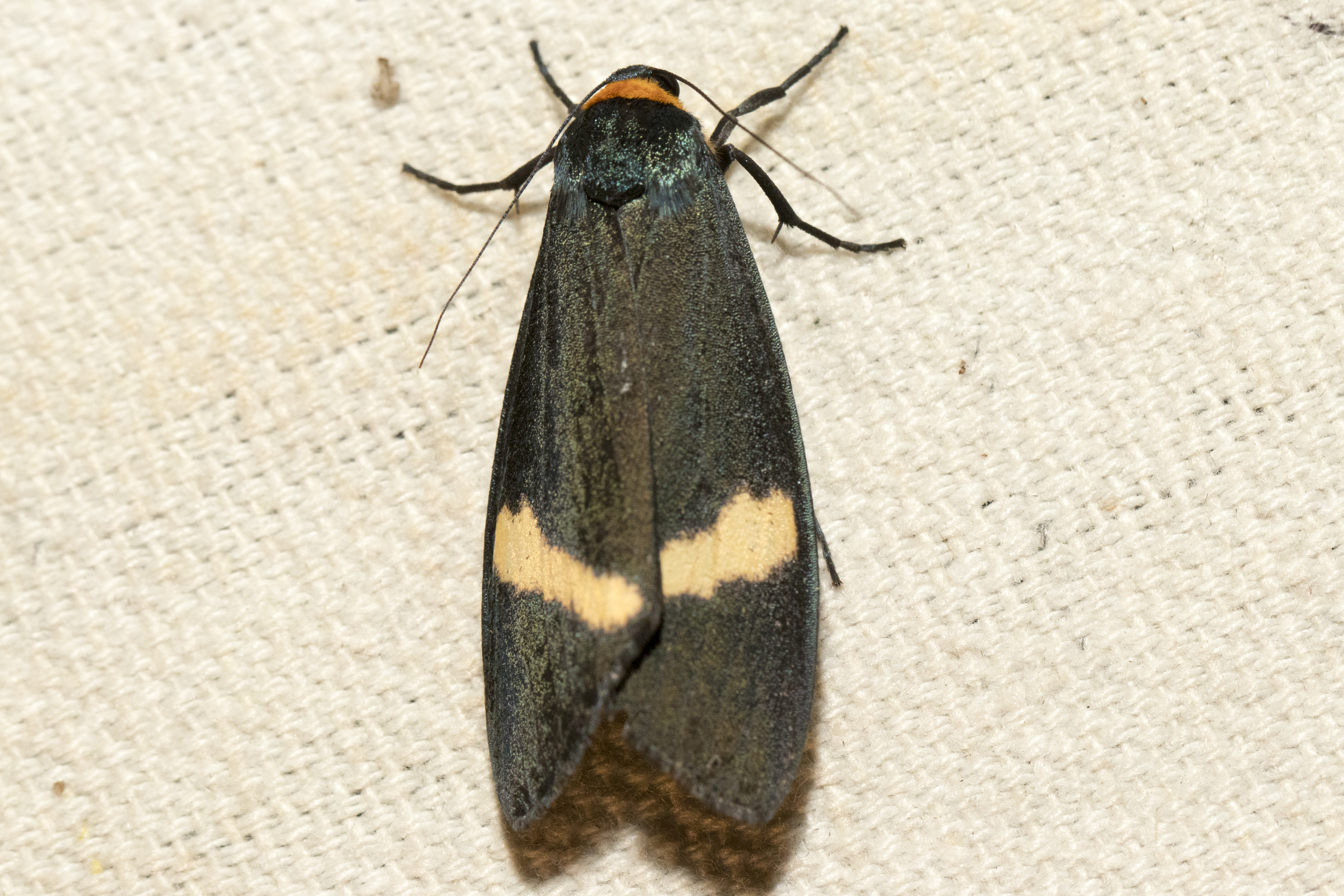

Scientific classification
- Kingdom: Animalia
- Phylum: Arthropoda
- Clade: Pancrustacea
- Class: Insecta
- Order: Lepidoptera
- Superfamily: Noctuoidea
- Family: Erebidae
- Subfamily: Arctiinae
- Genus: Macrobrochis
- Species: M. albifascia

Binomial name
- Macrobrochis albifascia (C.-L. Fang, 1982)

Synonyms
- Atolmis albifascia C.-L. Fang, 1982

= Macrobrochis albifascia =

Species of moth

Macrobrochis albifascia is a moth of the family Erebidae. It was described by Fang Chenglai in 1982. It is found in Tibet, Nepal, and North and Northeast India (Uttarakhand, Sikkim, and Arunachal Pradesh).
