= Eilema cocciniceps =

Scientific classification
- Kingdom: Animalia
- Phylum: Arthropoda
- Class: Insecta
- Order: Lepidoptera
- Superfamily: Noctuoidea
- Family: Erebidae
- Subfamily: Arctiinae
- Genus: Eilema
- Species: E. cocciniceps

Binomial name
- Eilema cocciniceps (Mabille, 1884)

Synonyms
- Lithosia cocciniceps Mabille, 1884; Paraona cocciniceps (Mabille, 1884)

Species of moth

Eilema cocciniceps is a moth of the family Erebidae. It was described by Paul Mabille in 1884. It is found on Madagascar. It was moved from Paraona to the genus Eilema in 2024; this change is yet to be recognized by major taxonomic databases.
