= Agylla septentrionalis =

Scientific classification
- Domain: Eukaryota
- Kingdom: Animalia
- Phylum: Arthropoda
- Class: Insecta
- Order: Lepidoptera
- Superfamily: Noctuoidea
- Family: Erebidae
- Subfamily: Arctiinae
- Genus: Agylla
- Species: A. septentrionalis

Binomial name
- Agylla septentrionalis Barnes & McDunnough, 1911

Synonyms
- Agylla septentrionalis Barnes & McDunnough, 1911

Species of moth

Agylla septentrionalis is a moth of the family Erebidae. It was described by William Barnes and James Halliday McDunnough in 1911. It is found in North America, including Arizona and South Carolina.

The wingspan is about 37 mm.
