= Macrobrochis fukiensis =

Scientific classification
- Domain: Eukaryota
- Kingdom: Animalia
- Phylum: Arthropoda
- Class: Insecta
- Order: Lepidoptera
- Superfamily: Noctuoidea
- Family: Erebidae
- Subfamily: Arctiinae
- Genus: Macrobrochis
- Species: M. fukiensis

Binomial name
- Macrobrochis fukiensis (Daniel, 1952)

Synonyms
- Paraona fukiensis Daniel, 1952

Species of moth

Macrobrochis fukiensis is a moth of the family Erebidae. It was described by Franz Daniel in 1952. It is found in southern China (the eponymous Fukien, now Romanized as Fujian; Hunan, Guangdong, Guangxi, Hainan) and in Southeast Asia (Vietnam, Thailand, and Peninsular Malaysia).

The wingspan is 46–62 mm (1.8–2.4 in).
