= Agylla gigas =

Scientific classification
- Domain: Eukaryota
- Kingdom: Animalia
- Phylum: Arthropoda
- Class: Insecta
- Order: Lepidoptera
- Superfamily: Noctuoidea
- Family: Erebidae
- Subfamily: Arctiinae
- Genus: Agylla
- Species: A. gigas

Binomial name
- Agylla gigas (Heylaerts, 1891)

Synonyms
- Chrysorabdia gigas Heylaerts, 1891

Species of moth

Agylla gigas is a moth of the family Erebidae. It was described by Franciscus J. M. Heylaerts in 1891. It is found on Java.
