= Agylla argentea =

Scientific classification
- Kingdom: Animalia
- Phylum: Arthropoda
- Class: Insecta
- Order: Lepidoptera
- Superfamily: Noctuoidea
- Family: Erebidae
- Subfamily: Arctiinae
- Genus: Agylla
- Species: A. argentea

Binomial name
- Agylla argentea (Walker, 1863)

Synonyms
- Salapola argentea Walker, 1863; Salapola vestalis Schaus, 1894

Species of insect

Agylla argentea is a moth of the family Erebidae. It was described by Francis Walker in 1863. It is found in the Brazilian states of São Paulo and Rio de Janeiro.
