= Macrobrochis nigra =

Scientific classification
- Kingdom: Animalia
- Phylum: Arthropoda
- Class: Insecta
- Order: Lepidoptera
- Superfamily: Noctuoidea
- Family: Erebidae
- Subfamily: Arctiinae
- Genus: Macrobrochis
- Species: M. nigra

Binomial name
- Macrobrochis nigra (Daniel, 1952/1953)

Synonyms
- Paraona nigra Daniel, 1952/1953

Species of moth

Macrobrochis nigra is a moth of the subfamily Arctiinae. It was described by Franz Daniel in 1952 or in 1953. It is found in central and western China in Shaanxi (type locality: Mount Taibai), Hubei, Sichuan, and Yunnan provinces. It has been found at an altitude of around 1700 m (5600 ft) a.s.l..

The wingspan is 40–56 mm (1.6–2.2 in).
