= Macrobrochis holosericea =

Scientific classification
- Kingdom: Animalia
- Phylum: Arthropoda
- Class: Insecta
- Order: Lepidoptera
- Superfamily: Noctuoidea
- Family: Erebidae
- Subfamily: Arctiinae
- Genus: Macrobrochis
- Species: M. holosericea

Binomial name
- Macrobrochis holosericea (Hampson, 1901)

Synonyms
- Agylla holosericea Hampson, 1901

Species of moth

Macrobrochis holosericea is a moth of the subfamily Arctiinae. It was described by George Hampson in 1901. It is found in western China.
