= Agylla auraria =

Scientific classification
- Domain: Eukaryota
- Kingdom: Animalia
- Phylum: Arthropoda
- Class: Insecta
- Order: Lepidoptera
- Superfamily: Noctuoidea
- Family: Erebidae
- Subfamily: Arctiinae
- Genus: Agylla
- Species: A. auraria

Binomial name
- Agylla auraria (Dognin, 1892)

Synonyms
- Crambomorpha auraria Dognin, 1892

Species of moth

Agylla auraria is a moth of the family Erebidae. It was described by Paul Dognin in 1894. It is found in Ecuador and Bolivia.
