= Agylla vittata =

Scientific classification
- Domain: Eukaryota
- Kingdom: Animalia
- Phylum: Arthropoda
- Class: Insecta
- Order: Lepidoptera
- Superfamily: Noctuoidea
- Family: Erebidae
- Subfamily: Arctiinae
- Genus: Agylla
- Species: A. vittata

Binomial name
- Agylla vittata (Leech, 1899)

Synonyms
- Gnophria vittata Leech, 1899

Species of moth

Agylla vittata is a moth of the family Erebidae. It was described by John Henry Leech in 1899. It is found in northern China.
