= Agylla beema =

Scientific classification
- Domain: Eukaryota
- Kingdom: Animalia
- Phylum: Arthropoda
- Class: Insecta
- Order: Lepidoptera
- Superfamily: Noctuoidea
- Family: Erebidae
- Subfamily: Arctiinae
- Genus: Agylla
- Species: A. beema

Binomial name
- Agylla beema (Moore, [1866])

Synonyms
- Lithosia beema Moore, [1866]

Species of moth

Agylla beema is a moth of the family Erebidae. It was described by Frederic Moore in 1866. It is found in Sikkim, India.
