= Agylla semirufa =

Scientific classification
- Kingdom: Animalia
- Phylum: Arthropoda
- Class: Insecta
- Order: Lepidoptera
- Superfamily: Noctuoidea
- Family: Erebidae
- Subfamily: Arctiinae
- Genus: Agylla
- Species: A. semirufa

Binomial name
- Agylla semirufa (Hampson, 1896)

Synonyms
- Macrobrochis semirufa Hampson, 1896

Species of moth

Agylla semirufa is a moth of the family Erebidae. It was described by George Hampson in 1896. It is found in Assam, India.
