= Agylla prasena =

Scientific classification
- Domain: Eukaryota
- Kingdom: Animalia
- Phylum: Arthropoda
- Class: Insecta
- Order: Lepidoptera
- Superfamily: Noctuoidea
- Family: Erebidae
- Subfamily: Arctiinae
- Genus: Agylla
- Species: A. prasena

Binomial name
- Agylla prasena (Moore, 1859)

Synonyms
- Tripura prasena Moore, 1859; Macrobrochis prasena (Moore, 1859)

Species of moth

Agylla prasena is a moth of the subfamily Arctiinae. It was described by Frederic Moore in 1859. It is found in India in the north-western Himalayas, Sikkim and Assam.
