= Ghoria lucida =

Scientific classification
- Kingdom: Animalia
- Phylum: Arthropoda
- Clade: Pancrustacea
- Class: Insecta
- Order: Lepidoptera
- Superfamily: Noctuoidea
- Family: Erebidae
- Subfamily: Arctiinae
- Genus: Ghoria
- Species: G. lucida

Binomial name
- Ghoria lucida (C.-L. Fang, 1990)

Synonyms
- Agylla lucida Fang, 1990

Species of moth

Ghoria lucida is a moth of the subfamily Arctiinae. It was described by Fang Chenglai in 1990. It is found in Yunnan, China.

The wingspan is 32–36 mm (1.3–1.4 in).
