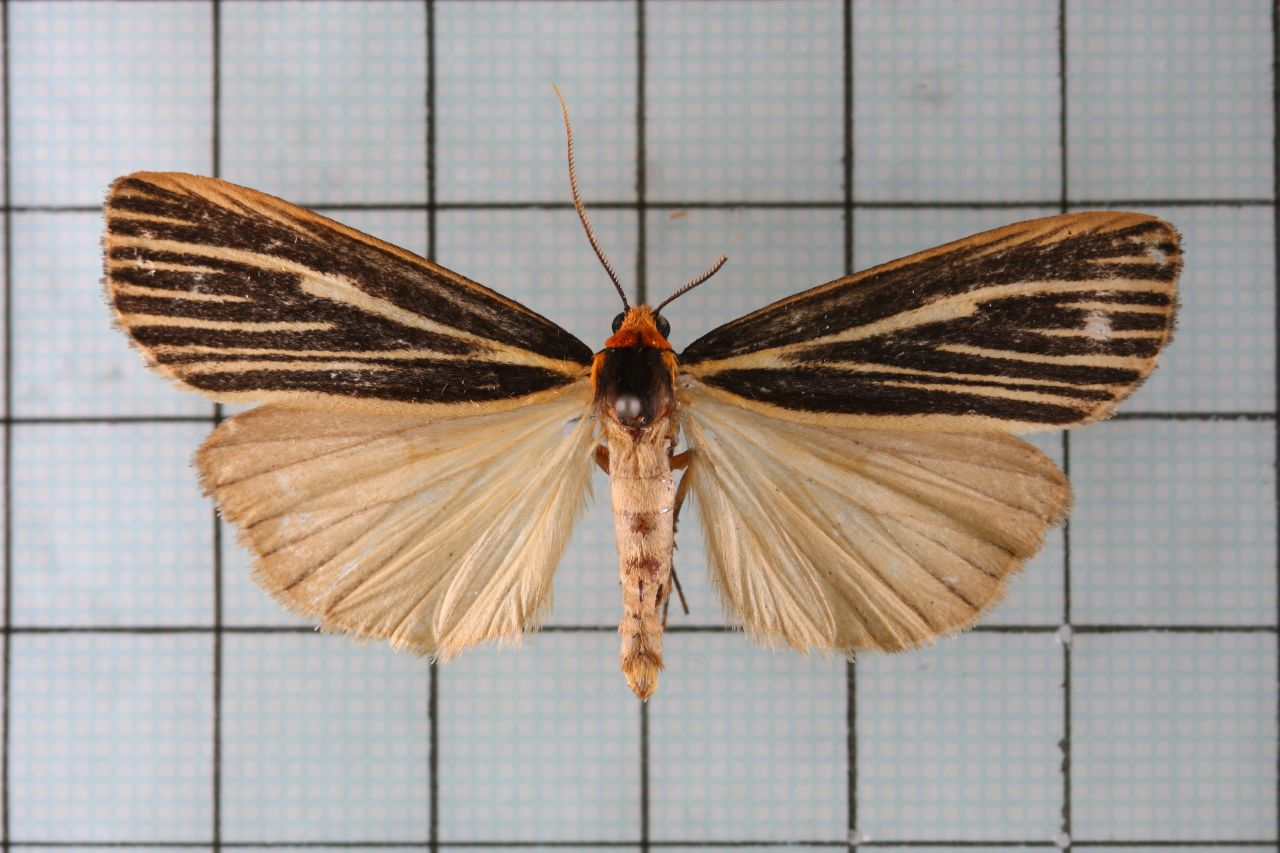
- Agylla pulchristriata

Scientific classification
- Domain: Eukaryota
- Kingdom: Animalia
- Phylum: Arthropoda
- Class: Insecta
- Order: Lepidoptera
- Superfamily: Noctuoidea
- Family: Erebidae
- Subfamily: Arctiinae
- Subtribe: Lithosiina
- Genus: Agylla; Walker, 1854

Synonyms
- Salapola Walker, 1863; Crambomorpha Felder, 1874; Macrocrambus Kirby, 1892

= Agylla (moth) =

Genus of moths

Agylla, also formerly known as Churinga, is a genus of moths in the subfamily Arctiinae. The genus was erected by Francis Walker in 1854.

== Species ==
- Agylla argentea (Walker, 1863)
- Agylla argentifera (Walker, 1866)
- Agylla asakurana (Matsumura, 1931)
- Agylla auraria (Dognin, 1892)
- Agylla barbicosta Hampson, 1900
- Agylla barbipalpia Schaus, 1899
- Agylla beema (Moore, [1866])
- Agylla corcovada (Schaus, 1894)
- Agylla dentifera Hampson, 1900
- Agylla dognini Hampson, 1900
- Agylla fasciculata Walker, 1854
- Agylla flavitincta Dognin, 1899
- Agylla foyi (Dognin, 1894)
- Agylla gigas (Heylaerts, 1891)
- Agylla hermanilla (Dognin, 1894)
- Agylla involuta Hampson, 1900
- Agylla maasseni (Dognin, 1894)
- Agylla marcata (Schaus, 1894)
- Agylla marginata (Druce, 1885)
- Agylla metaxantha (Hampson, 1895)
- Agylla nivea (Walker, 1856)
- Agylla nochiza (Dognin, 1894)
- Agylla nubens (Schaus, 1899)
- Agylla obliquisigna Schaus, 1899
- Agylla pallens (Hampson, 1894)
- Agylla perpensa (Schaus, 1894)
- Agylla polysemata Schaus, 1899
- Agylla postfusca (Hampson, 1894)
- Agylla prasena (Moore, 1859)
- Agylla pulchristriata Kishida, 1984
- Agylla rotunda Hampson, 1900
- Agylla semirufa (Hampson, 1896)
- Agylla separata (Schaus, 1894)
- Agylla septentrionalis Barnes & McDunnough, 1911
- Agylla sericea (Druce, 1885)
- Agylla sinensis (Leech, 1899)
- Agylla strigula Hampson, 1900
- Agylla tobera (Dognin, 1894)
- Agylla tolteca (Schaus, 1889)
- Agylla tumidicosta Hampson, 1900
- Agylla umbrifera (Felder, 1874)
- Agylla umbrosa (Dognin, 1894)
- Agylla venosa (Schaus, 1894)
- Agylla virago Rothschild, 1913
- Agylla vittata (Leech, 1899)
- Agylla zopisa (Dognin, 1894)
- Agylla zucarina (Dognin, 1894)
