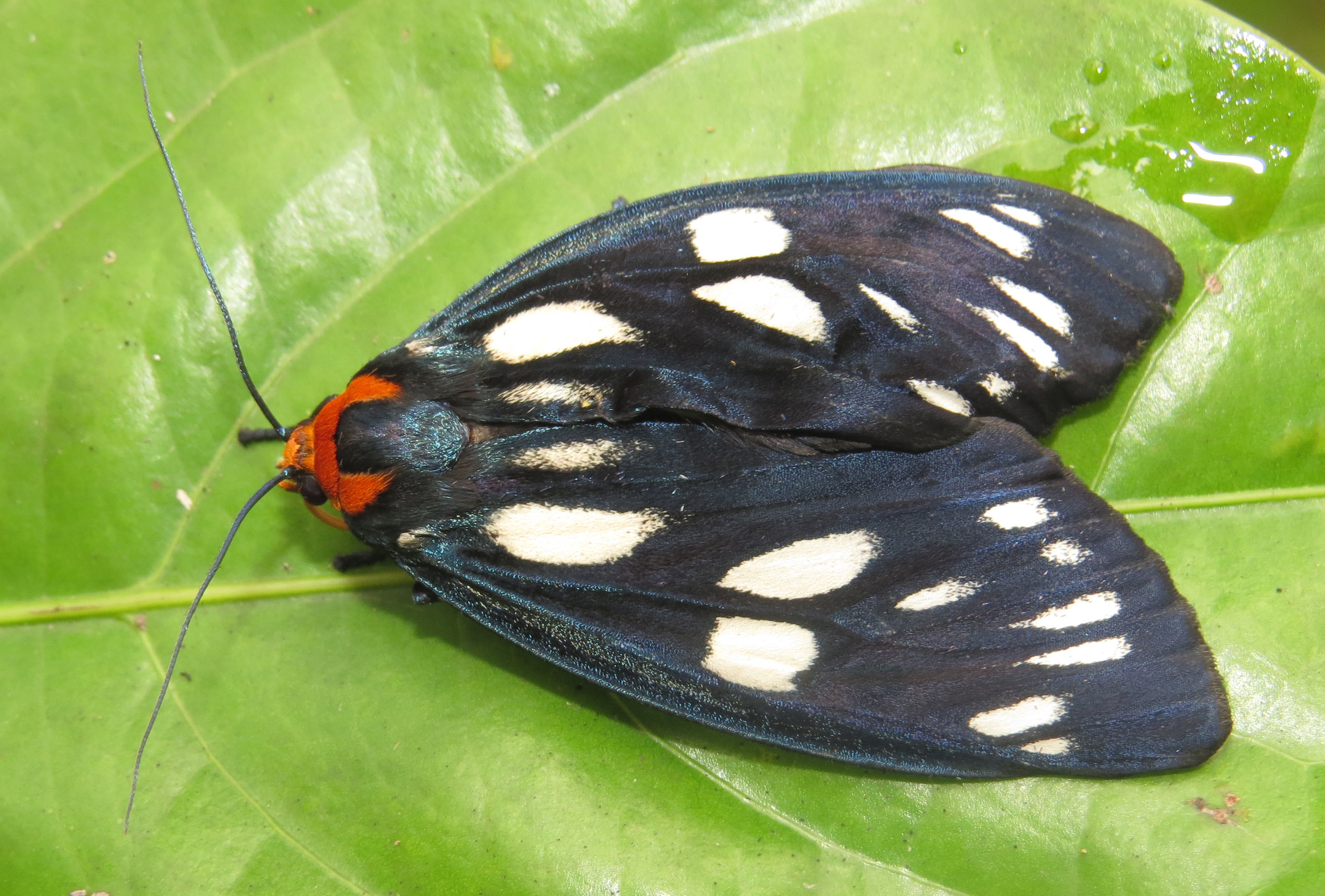
- From Peravoor, Kerala, India

Scientific classification
- Kingdom: Animalia
- Phylum: Arthropoda
- Class: Insecta
- Order: Lepidoptera
- Superfamily: Noctuoidea
- Family: Erebidae
- Subfamily: Arctiinae
- Genus: Macrobrochis
- Species: M. gigas

Binomial name
- Macrobrochis gigas (Walker, 1854)

Synonyms
- Lithosia gigas Walker, 1854; Macrobrochis interstitialis Herrich-Schäffer, [1856]; Macrobrochis leucospilota Moore, 1878; Macrobrochis nigrescens Moore, 1878; Macrobrochis atrata Butler, 1881; Macrobrochis albicans Butler, 1881

= Macrobrochis gigas =

Species of moth

Macrobrochis gigas is a moth of the family Erebidae. It was described by Francis Walker in 1854. It is found in China (Yunnan), India (Sikkim), Bhutan, Nepal, Indonesia, Thailand, Hong Kong and Taiwan. The habitat consists of woodlands.

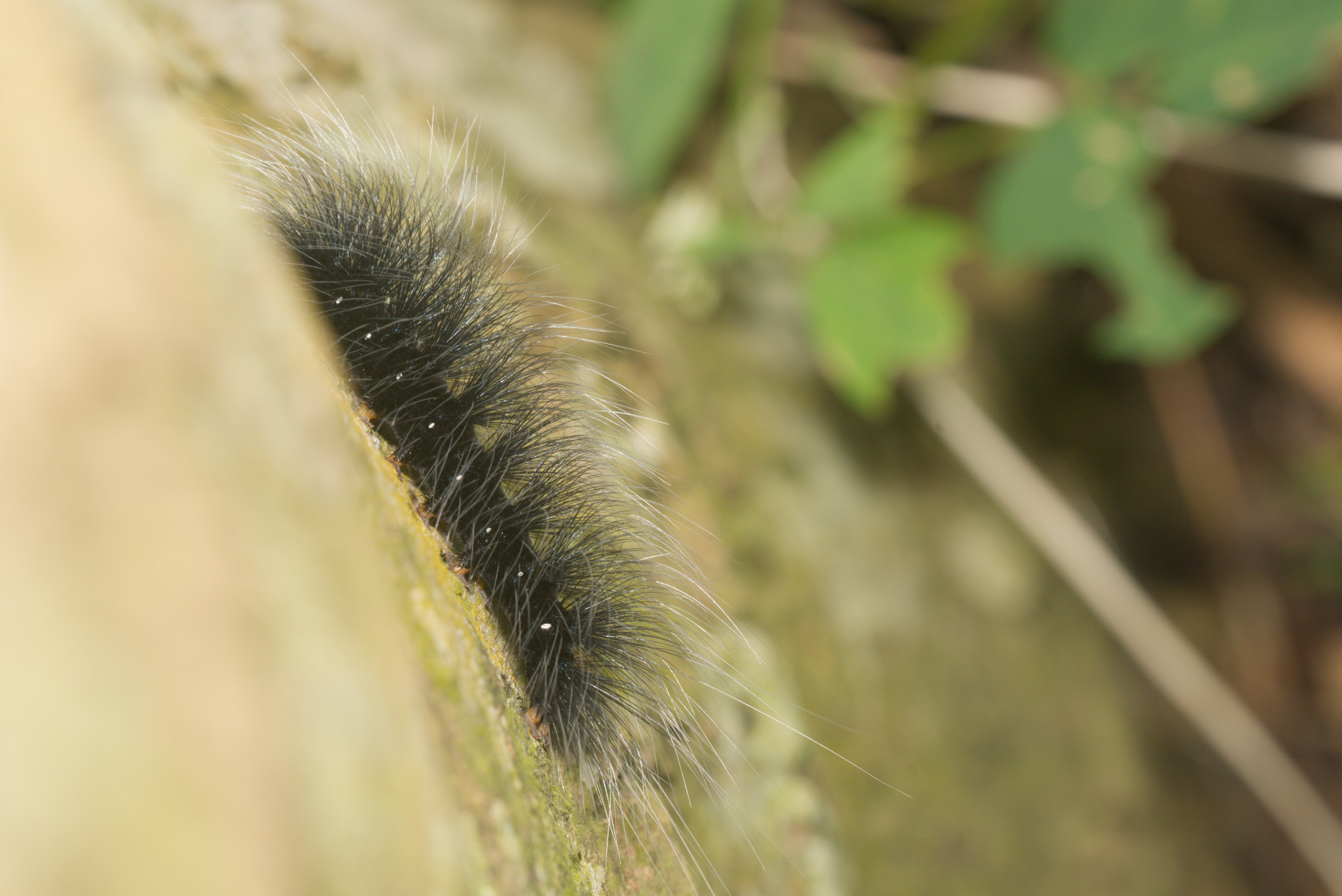
Larva

Adults have been recorded on wing from March to May. There is one generation per year. The species is possibly involved in a mimicry relationship with Eterusia aedea.

Macrobrochis gigas differs from congeners in the following morphological characters: orange head and collar; thorax black above with green metallic tinge and orange below; tegulae striped with orange; abdomen greenish black, the extremity and ventral surface orange; abdomen with white bands or lateral spots on the hind borders of each segment; forewing black with a green tinge, with a small white spot at the base, with a larger one beyond it, and a spot at the end of the cell and another below it; hindwing with the basal half white, the outer half black. Mass aggregation and feeding behavior of this species adult and larvae observed in several sites in South India

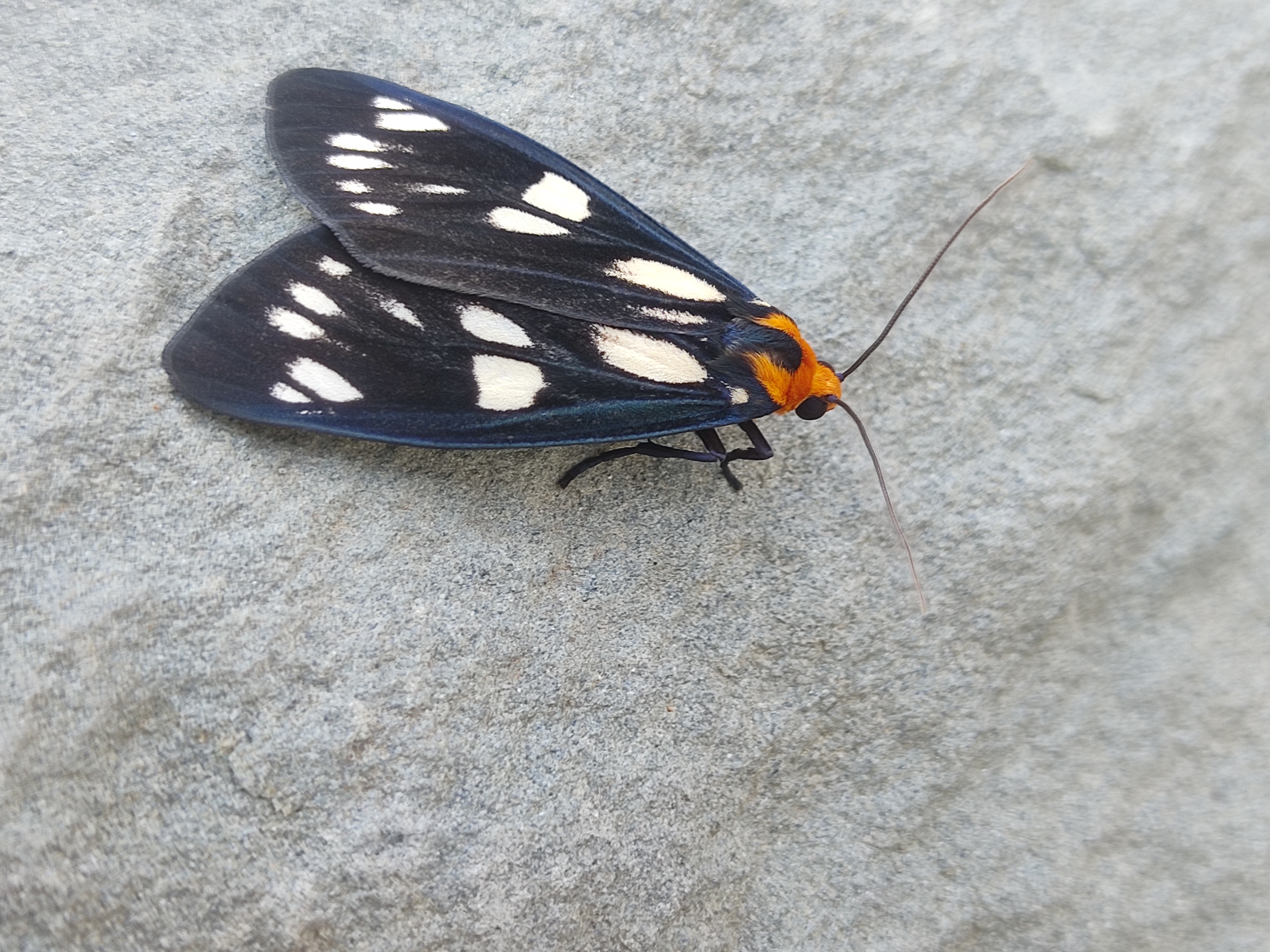
Adult moth in Shimla, Himachal Pradesh, India
