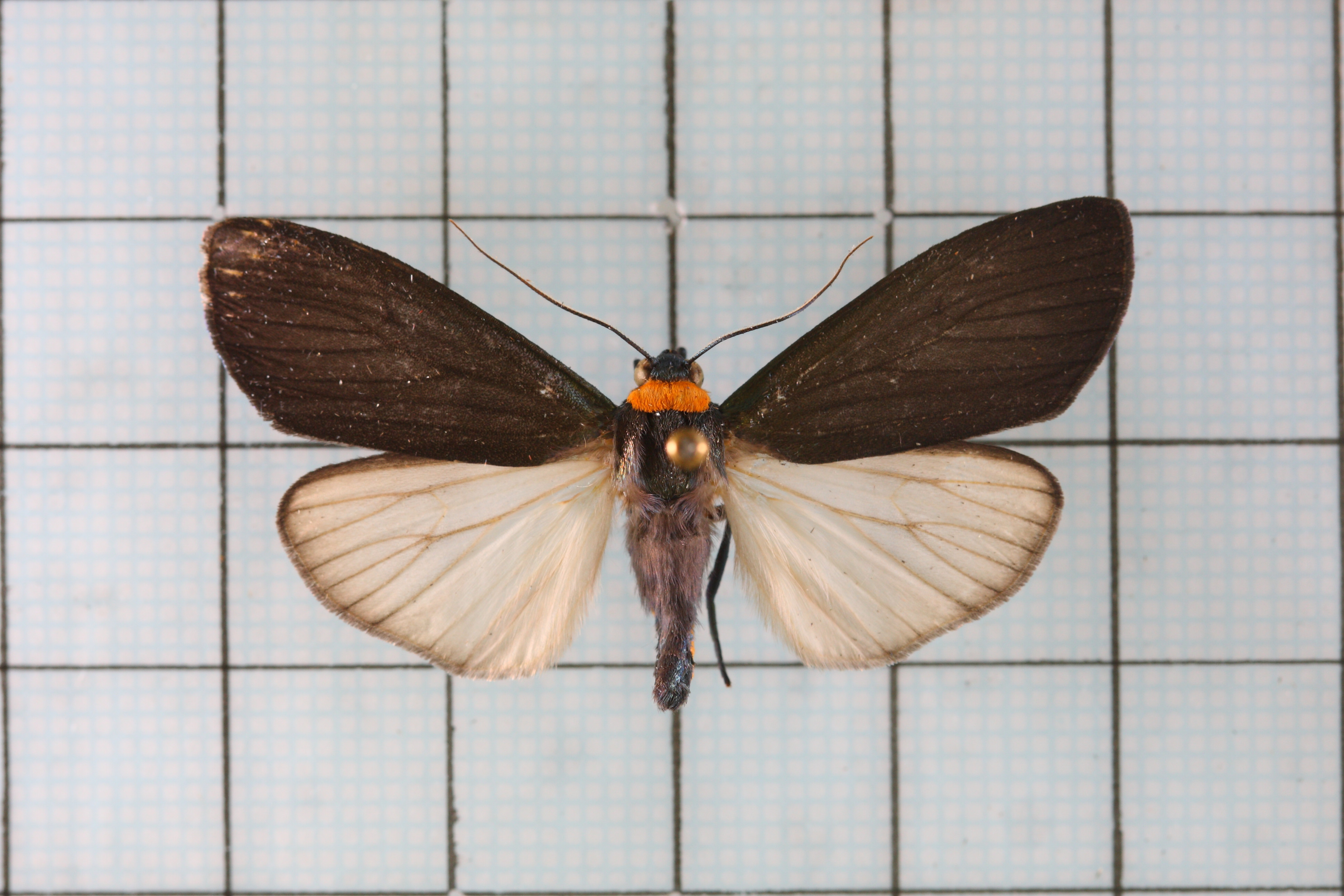
- Paraona staudingeri formosana
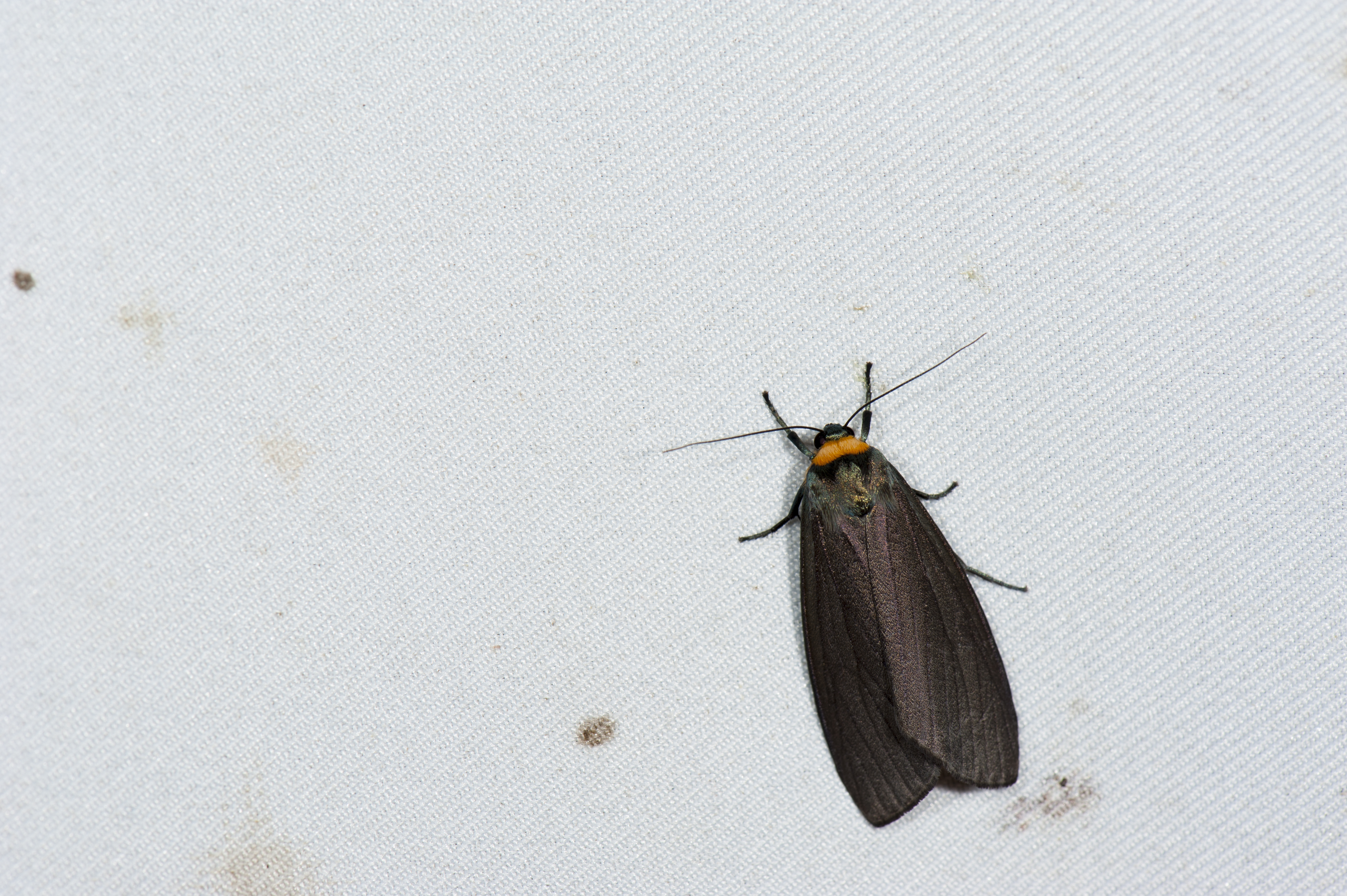

Scientific classification
- Domain: Eukaryota
- Kingdom: Animalia
- Phylum: Arthropoda
- Class: Insecta
- Order: Lepidoptera
- Superfamily: Noctuoidea
- Family: Erebidae
- Subfamily: Arctiinae
- Genus: Paraona
- Species: P. staudingeri

Binomial name
- Paraona staudingeri Alphéraky, 1897

Synonyms
- Macrobrochis staudingeri; Paraona benderi Roesler, 1967; Macrobrochis benderi

= Paraona staudingeri =

Species of moth

Paraona staudingeri is a moth of the family Erebidae first described by Sergei Alphéraky in 1897. It is found in the Russian Far East, China, Korea, Japan and Taiwan.

The wingspan is about 35–50 mm. Adults are on wing in May.

== Subspecies ==
- Paraona staudingeri staudingeri
- Paraona staudingeri formosana Okano, 1960 (Taiwan)
