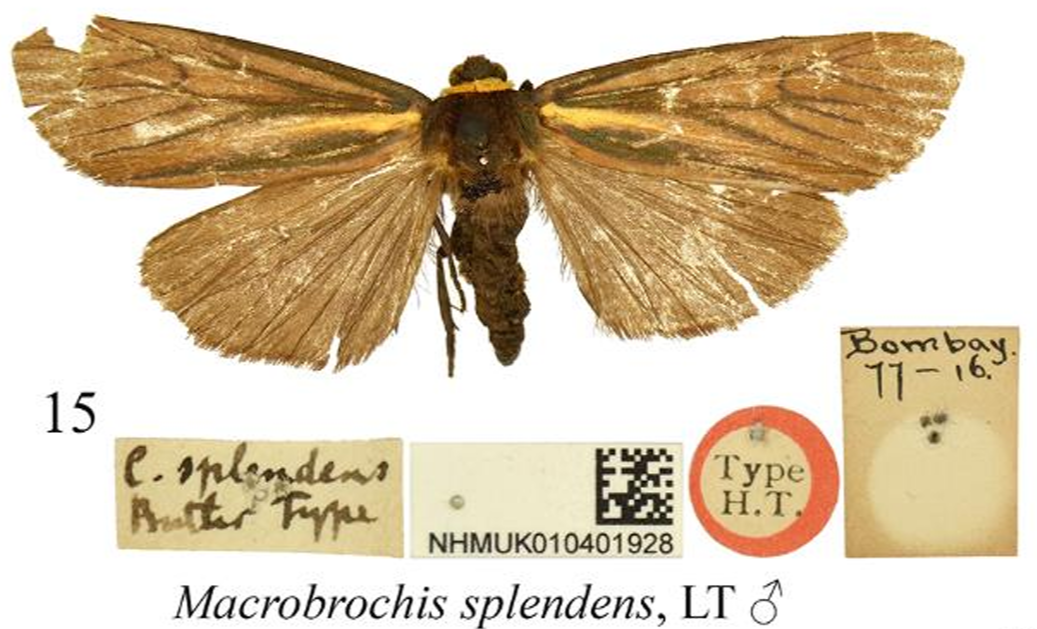
- Male specimen (lectotype)
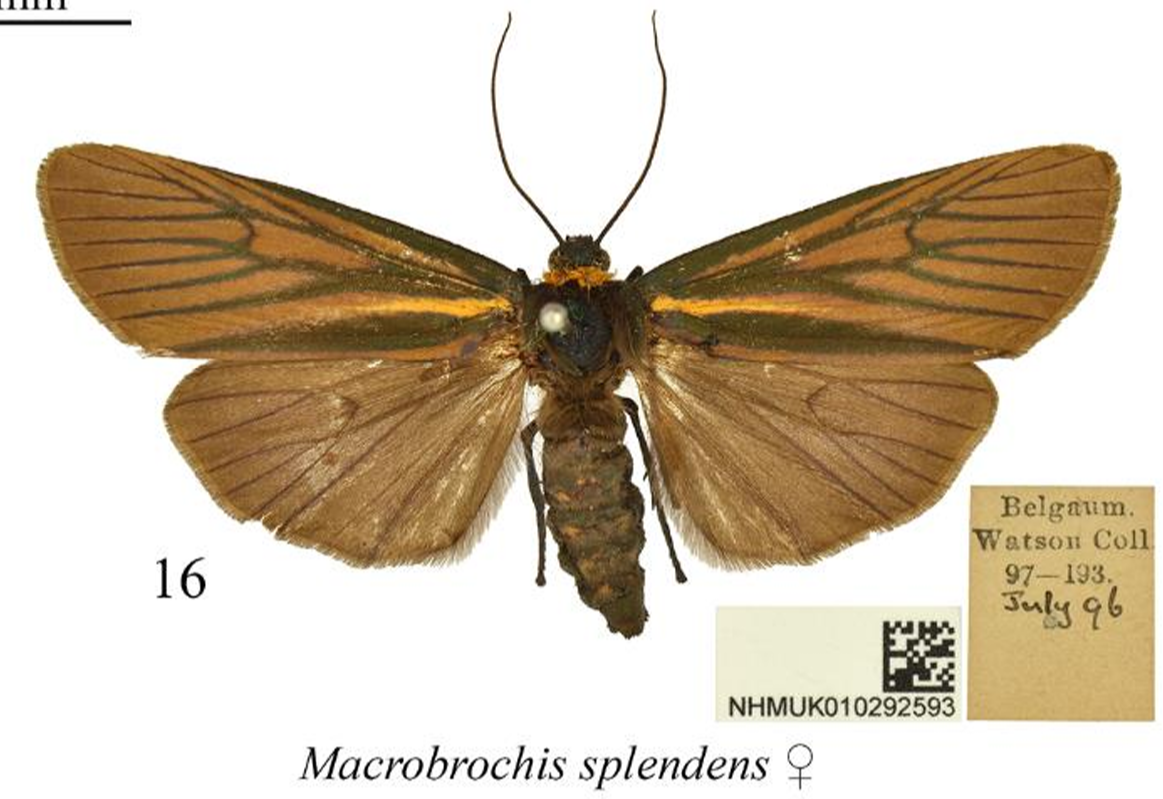
- Female specimen

Scientific classification
- Kingdom: Animalia
- Phylum: Arthropoda
- Class: Insecta
- Order: Lepidoptera
- Superfamily: Noctuoidea
- Family: Erebidae
- Subfamily: Arctiinae
- Genus: Macrobrochis
- Species: M. splendens

Binomial name
- Macrobrochis splendens (Butler, 1877)

Synonyms
- Crambomorpha splendens Butler, 1877; Paraona splendens (Butler, 1877)

= Macrobrochis splendens =

Species of moth

Macrobrochis splendens or Paraona splendens is a moth of the family Erebidae. It was described by Arthur Gardiner Butler in 1877. It is found in West and South India. The length of the forewing in males is 19.0–25.5 mm (0.75–1.00 in) and 23.0–27.5 mm (0.91–1.08 in) so the size is quite variable.
