= Nordstromia fuscula =

Scientific classification
- Domain: Eukaryota
- Kingdom: Animalia
- Phylum: Arthropoda
- Class: Insecta
- Order: Lepidoptera
- Family: Drepanidae
- Genus: Nordstromia
- Species: N. fuscula

Binomial name
- Nordstromia fuscula Chu & Wang, 1988

Species of hook-tip moth

Nordstromia fuscula is a moth in the family Drepanidae. It was described by Hong-Fu Chu and Lin-Yao Wang in 1988. It is found in the Chinese provinces of Sichuan and Fujian.

Adults resemble Nordstromia fusca, but can be distinguished by the wing pattern and the male genitalia.
