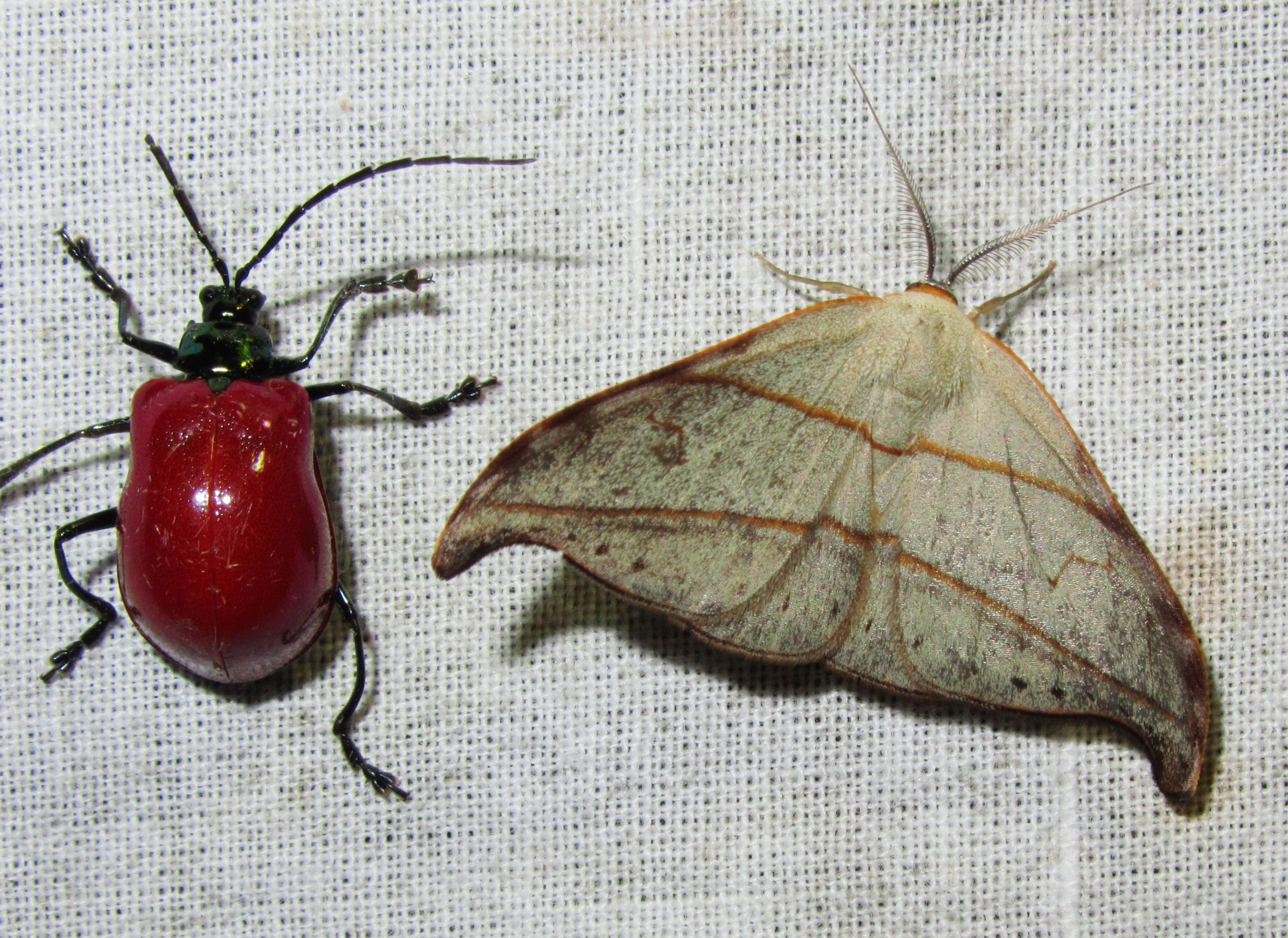

Scientific classification
- Domain: Eukaryota
- Kingdom: Animalia
- Phylum: Arthropoda
- Class: Insecta
- Order: Lepidoptera
- Family: Drepanidae
- Genus: Nordstromia
- Species: N. argenticeps

Binomial name
- Nordstromia argenticeps (Warren, 1922)

Synonyms
- Albara argenticeps Warren, 1922

= Nordstromia argenticeps =

Species of hook-tip moth

Nordstromia argenticeps is a moth in the family Drepanidae. It was described by Warren in 1922. It is found in the Khasi Hills of north-eastern India and in Nepal.

Adults are similar to Nordstromia sumatrana, except for the shape of the postmedial fascia which is weakly sigmoid.

The larvae feed on Rubus species.
