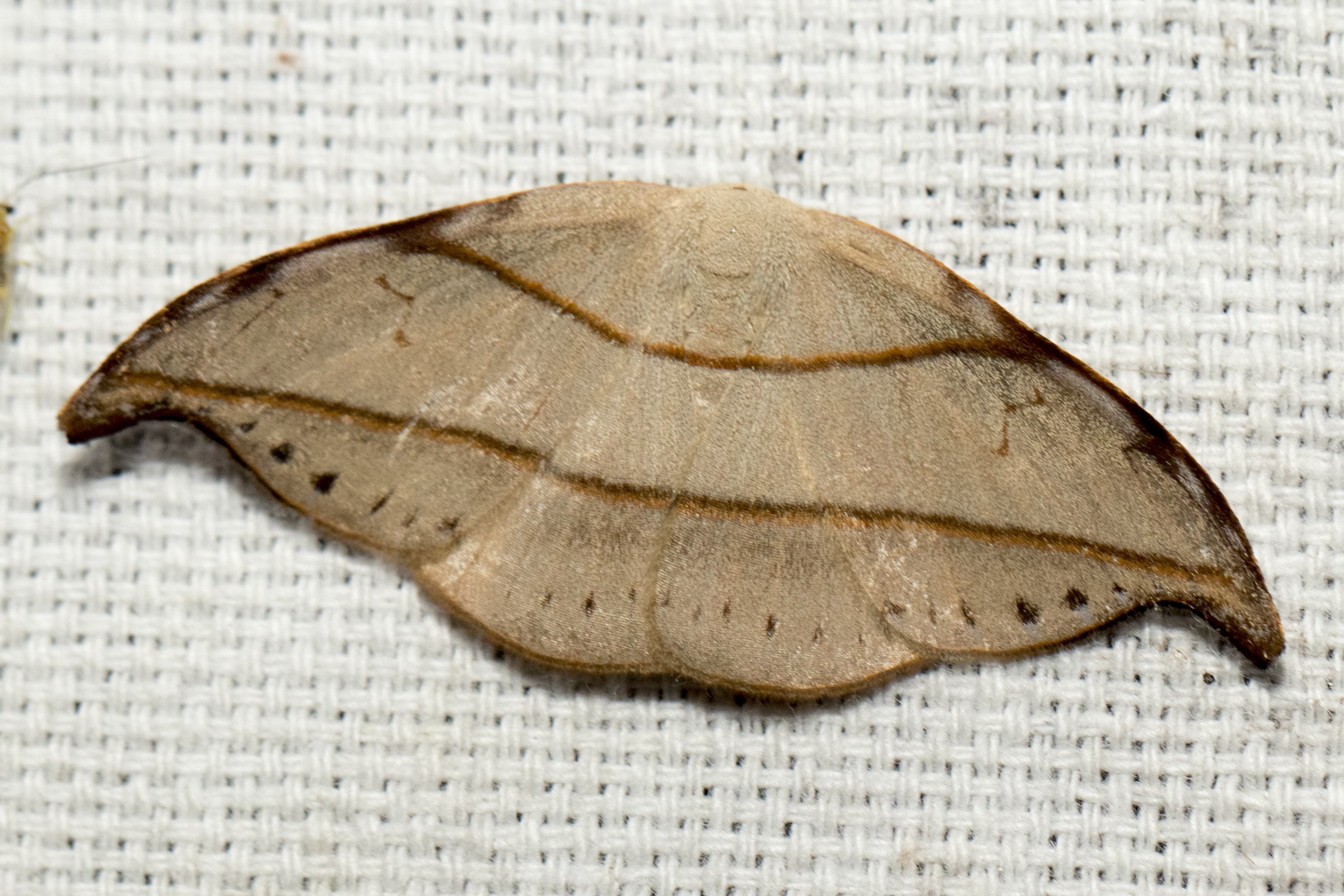

Scientific classification
- Kingdom: Animalia
- Phylum: Arthropoda
- Clade: Pancrustacea
- Class: Insecta
- Order: Lepidoptera
- Family: Drepanidae
- Genus: Nordstromia
- Species: N. lilacina

Binomial name
- Nordstromia lilacina (Moore, 1888)

Synonyms
- Drepana lilacina Moore, 1888; Albara olivacea ab. pallidior Warren, 1922

= Nordstromia lilacina =

Species of hook-tip moth

Nordstromia lilacina is a moth in the family Drepanidae. It is found in India and mainland China. Reports from Taiwan refer to Nordstromia semililacina.

The larvae feed on the leaves of Quercus variabilis.
