= Nordstromia simillima =

Scientific classification
- Domain: Eukaryota
- Kingdom: Animalia
- Phylum: Arthropoda
- Class: Insecta
- Order: Lepidoptera
- Family: Drepanidae
- Genus: Nordstromia
- Species: N. simillima

Binomial name
- Nordstromia simillima (Moore, 1888)

Synonyms
- Drepana simillima Moore, 1888; Albara simillima

Species of hook-tip moth

Nordstromia simillima is a moth in the family Drepanidae. It was described by Frederic Moore in 1888. It is found in Kashmir in what was north-western British India.

Adults are pale brownish ochreous, both wings crossed by a similar antemedial and a postmedial line. Both these lines are of a paler tint than the ground colour of the wings. The costal spots are larger, and there is a small spot at the lower end of the cell, as well as those on the outer margin of both wings.
