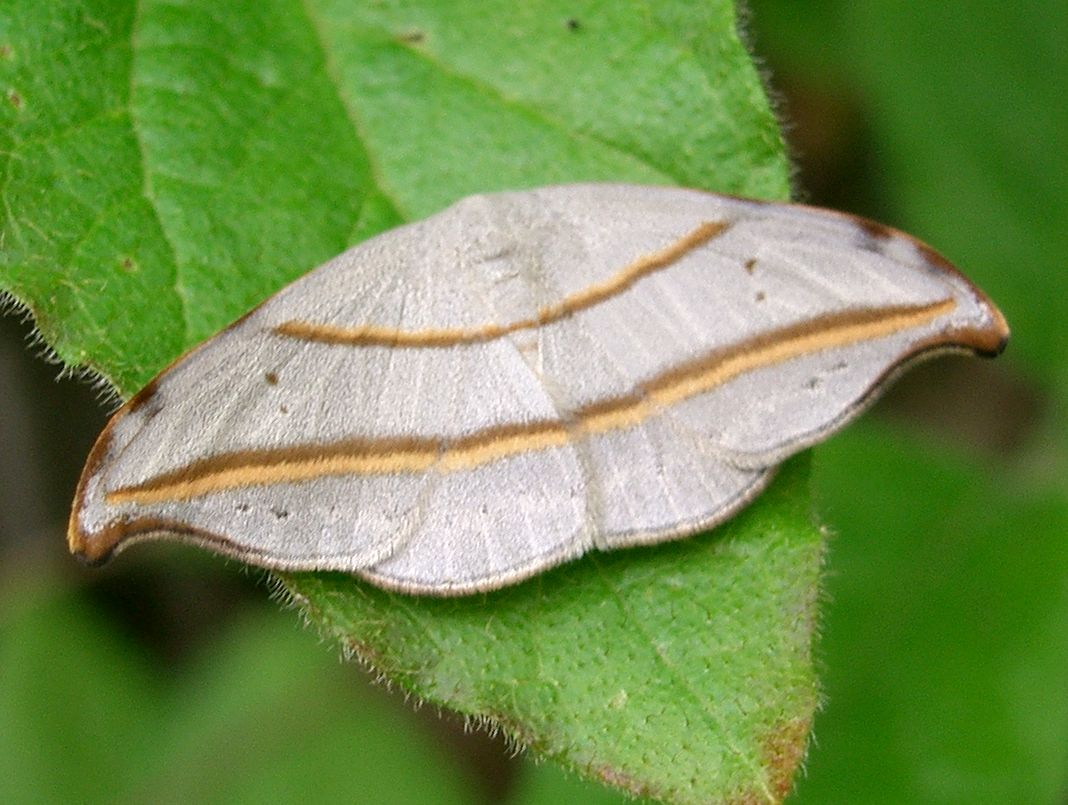
- Nordstromia japonica

Scientific classification
- Domain: Eukaryota
- Kingdom: Animalia
- Phylum: Arthropoda
- Class: Insecta
- Order: Lepidoptera
- Family: Drepanidae
- Subfamily: Drepaninae
- Tribe: Drepanini
- Genus: Nordstromia; Bryk, 1943

Synonyms
- Nordströmia Bryk, 1943; Nordstroemia Watson, 1968; Allodrepana Roepke, 1948

= Nordstromia =

Moth genus in family Drepanidae

Nordstromia is a genus of moths belonging to the subfamily Drepaninae.

== Species ==
- Nordstromia agna (Oberthür, 1916)
- Nordstromia angula H.F. Chu & L.Y. Wang, 1988
- Nordstromia argenticeps (Warren, 1922)
- Nordstromia bicostata (Hampson, 1912)
- Nordstromia coffeata Inoue, 1992
- Nordstromia duplicata (Warren, 1922)
- Nordstromia fusca H.F. Chu & L.Y. Wang, 1988
- Nordstromia fuscula H.F. Chu & L.Y. Wang, 1988
- Nordstromia grisearia (Staudinger, 1892)
- Nordstromia guenterriedeli Buchsbaum, 2010
- Nordstromia heba H.F. Chu & L.Y. Wang, 1988
- Nordstromia humerata (Warren, 1896)
- Nordstromia japonica (Moore, 1877)
- Nordstromia lilacina (Moore, 1888)
- Nordstromia nigra H.F. Chu & L.Y. Wang, 1988
- Nordstromia niva H.F. Chu & L.Y. Wang, 1988
- Nordstromia ochrozona (Bryk, 1943)
- Nordstromia paralilacina M. Wang & Yazaki, 2004
- Nordstromia problematica (Bryk, 1943)
- Nordstromia recava (Watson, 1968)
- Nordstromia siccifolia (Roepke, 1948)
- Nordstromia semililacina Inoue, 1992
- Nordstromia simillima (Moore, 1888)
- Nordstromia sumatrana (Roepke, 1948)
- Nordstromia undata (Watson, 1968)
- Nordstromia unilinea H.F. Chu & L.Y. Wang, 1988
- Nordstromia vira (Moore, [1866])

== Former species ==
- Nordstromia amabilis Bryk, 1942
