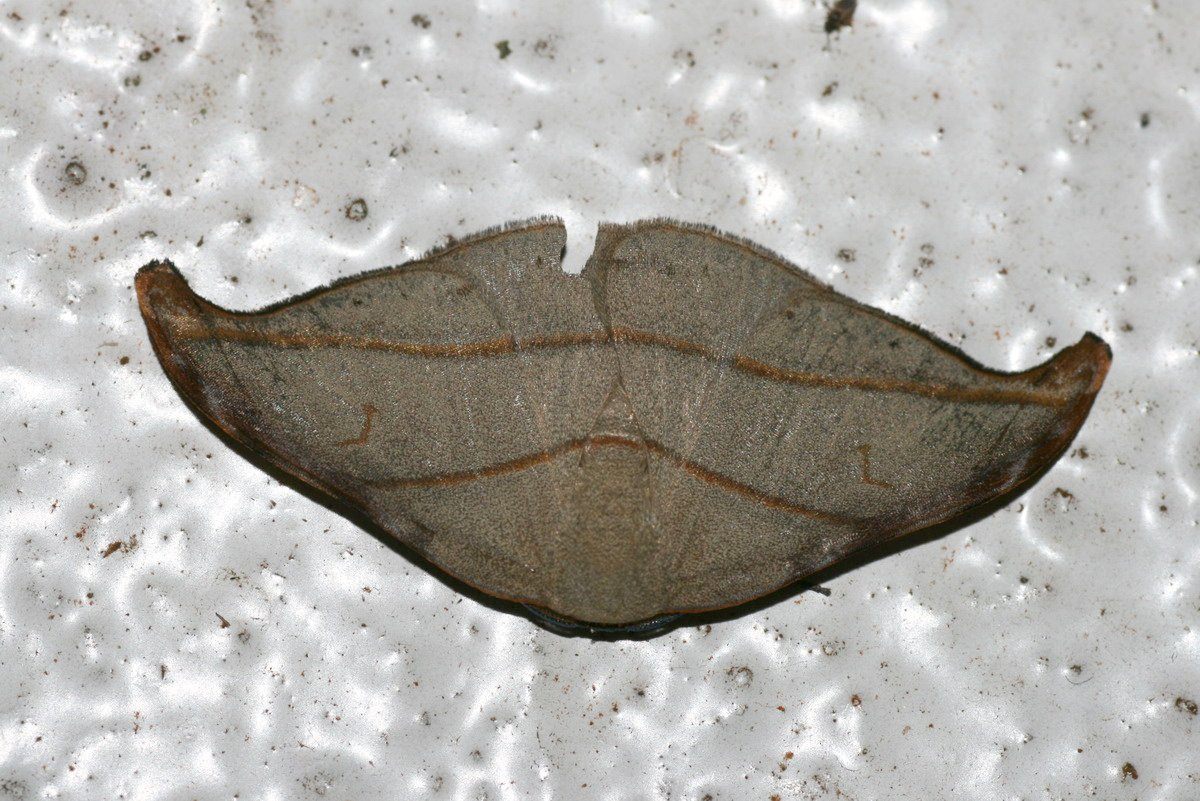

Scientific classification
- Domain: Eukaryota
- Kingdom: Animalia
- Phylum: Arthropoda
- Class: Insecta
- Order: Lepidoptera
- Family: Drepanidae
- Genus: Nordstromia
- Species: N. duplicata

Binomial name
- Nordstromia duplicata (Warren, 1922)

Synonyms
- Albara duplicata Warren, 1922; Albara olivacea Warren, 1922

= Nordstromia duplicata =

Species of hook-tip moth

Nordstromia duplicata is a moth in the family Drepanidae. It was described by Warren in 1922. It is found in north-eastern India, China (Zhejiang), Borneo and Sumatra. It has also been recorded from Japan.
