= Nordstromia undata =

Scientific classification
- Domain: Eukaryota
- Kingdom: Animalia
- Phylum: Arthropoda
- Class: Insecta
- Order: Lepidoptera
- Family: Drepanidae
- Genus: Nordstromia
- Species: N. undata

Binomial name
- Nordstromia undata (Watson, 1968)

Synonyms
- Nordstroemia undata Watson, 1968

Species of hook-tip moth

Nordstromia undata is a moth in the family Drepanidae. It was described by Watson in 1968. It is found in Yunnan, China.
