= Nordstromia humerata =

Scientific classification
- Domain: Eukaryota
- Kingdom: Animalia
- Phylum: Arthropoda
- Class: Insecta
- Order: Lepidoptera
- Family: Drepanidae
- Genus: Nordstromia
- Species: N. humerata

Binomial name
- Nordstromia humerata (Warren, 1896)

Synonyms
- Albara humerata Warren, 1896

Species of hook-tip moth

Nordstromia humerata is a moth in the family Drepanidae. It was described by Warren in 1896. It is found in north-eastern India.

The wingspan is 22–25 mm for females. The forewings are fawn colour, but the costal edge is yellowish from the base to the middle. The lines are ferruginous, starting from dark brown costal spots. The first at one-fourth, oblique outwards, angled on the subcostal, then straight and vertical or slightly oblique to the inner margin beyond one-third. The second line from the costa at the middle, runs outward along the subcostal vein for two-thirds of the distance to the apex, then sharply angulated, incurved opposite the cell and outcurved below it, reaching the inner margin straight at four-fifths. The submarginal line is strongly denticulate and blackish. The marginal area is dark grey, with some irregular black marks before the fringe, which is chestnut with a pale basal line. The apical one-third of the costa has a chestnut streak, the apex itself with one or two snow-white spots. The cell-spot is large, blackish, followed obliquely below it by four small white spots edged with black, and sometimes altogether black. The hindwings are fawn colour, in the females with the costal area ochreous and in the males with an ochreous tint suffusing the wing and leaving only the inner and anal margins fawn colour. There is a curved postmedian line, abbreviated in the males, reaching to the ochreous costal part in the females, which also has a short antemedian line on the inner margin which is wanting in males.
