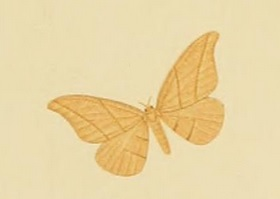

Scientific classification
- Domain: Eukaryota
- Kingdom: Animalia
- Phylum: Arthropoda
- Class: Insecta
- Order: Lepidoptera
- Family: Drepanidae
- Genus: Nordstromia
- Species: N. grisearia

Binomial name
- Nordstromia grisearia (Staudinger, 1892)

Synonyms
- Drepana grisearia Staudinger, 1892

= Nordstromia grisearia =

Species of hook-tip moth

Nordstromia grisearia is a moth in the family Drepanidae. It was described by Otto Staudinger in 1892. It is found in the Russian Far East (Amur Oblast), Japan and China (Sichuan, Fujian).

The larvae feed on Fagus and Quercus species.
