= Nordstromia angula =

Scientific classification
- Domain: Eukaryota
- Kingdom: Animalia
- Phylum: Arthropoda
- Class: Insecta
- Order: Lepidoptera
- Family: Drepanidae
- Genus: Nordstromia
- Species: N. angula

Binomial name
- Nordstromia angula Chu & Wang, 1988

Species of hook-tip moth

Nordstromia angula is a moth in the family Drepanidae. It was described by Hong-Fu Chu and Lin-Yao Wang in 1988. It is found in Fujian, China.
