= Nordstromia ochrozona =

Scientific classification
- Kingdom: Animalia
- Phylum: Arthropoda
- Class: Insecta
- Order: Lepidoptera
- Family: Drepanidae
- Genus: Nordstromia
- Species: N. ochrozona

Binomial name
- Nordstromia ochrozona (Bryk, 1943)

Synonyms
- Albara ochrozona Bryk, 1943

Species of hook-tip moth

Nordstromia ochrozona is a moth in the family Drepanidae. It was described by Felix Bryk in 1943. It is found in north-eastern Myanmar.
