= Nordstromia unilinea =

Scientific classification
- Domain: Eukaryota
- Kingdom: Animalia
- Phylum: Arthropoda
- Class: Insecta
- Order: Lepidoptera
- Family: Drepanidae
- Genus: Nordstromia
- Species: N. unilinea

Binomial name
- Nordstromia unilinea Chu & Wang, 1988

Species of hook-tip moth

Nordstromia unilinea is a moth in the family Drepanidae. It was described by Hong-Fu Chu and Lin-Yao Wang in 1988. It is found in Fujian, China.

Adults can be distinguished from other species in the genus by the dark brown colour of the wings with yellow crosslines on the forewings.
