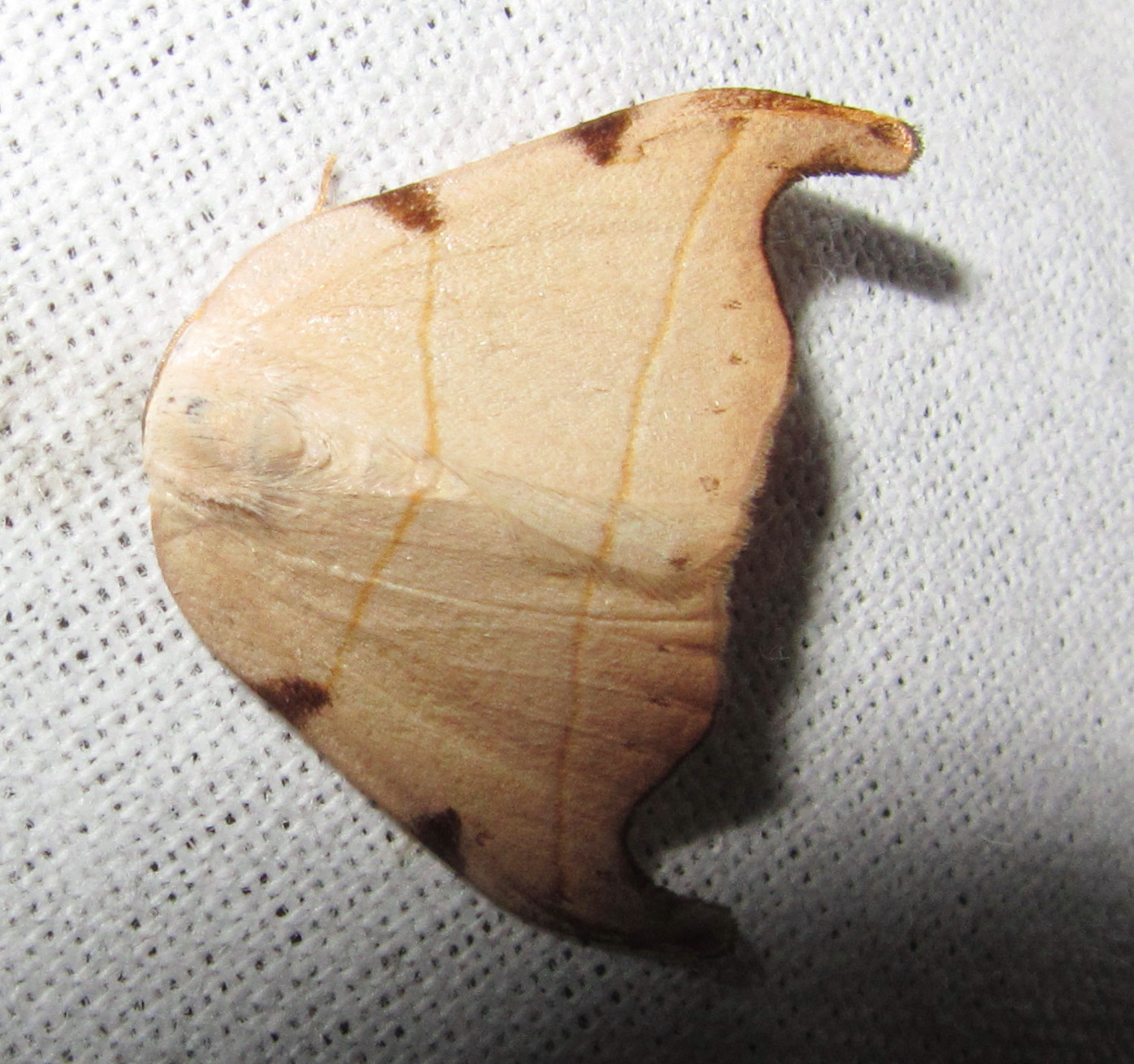

Scientific classification
- Kingdom: Animalia
- Phylum: Arthropoda
- Class: Insecta
- Order: Lepidoptera
- Family: Drepanidae
- Genus: Nordstromia
- Species: N. bicostata

Binomial name
- Nordstromia bicostata (Hampson, 1912)

Synonyms
- Drepana bicostata Hampson, 1912; Drepana opalescens Oberthür, 1916

= Nordstromia bicostata =

Species of hook-tip moth

Nordstromia bicostata is a moth in the family Drepanidae. It was described by George Hampson in 1912. It is found in Sikkim in India, Sichuan in China, Nepal and northern Myanmar.

The wingspan is about 28 mm. The forewings are pale violaceous brown with red-brown antemedial and postmedial patches on the costa, the former with a slightly incurved fulvous line from it to the inner margin. There is an oblique fulvous subterminal line and the costal area towards the apex, the termen and cilia to vein 3 are all suffused with red-brown. The hindwings are ochreous yellow, the inner area greyish with a fulvous postmedial bar.

== Subspecies ==
- Nordstromia bicostata bicostata (India, Nepal, Myanmar)
- Nordstromia bicostata opalescens (Oberthür, 1916) (China: Sichuan)
