= Nordstromia problematica =

Scientific classification
- Kingdom: Animalia
- Phylum: Arthropoda
- Class: Insecta
- Order: Lepidoptera
- Family: Drepanidae
- Genus: Nordstromia
- Species: N. problematica

Binomial name
- Nordstromia problematica (Bryk, 1943)

Synonyms
- Albara problematica Bryk, 1943; Albara problematica f. aestivalis Bryk, 1943

Species of hook-tip moth

Nordstromia problematica is a moth in the family Drepanidae. It was described by Felix Bryk in 1943. It is found in northern Myanmar.
