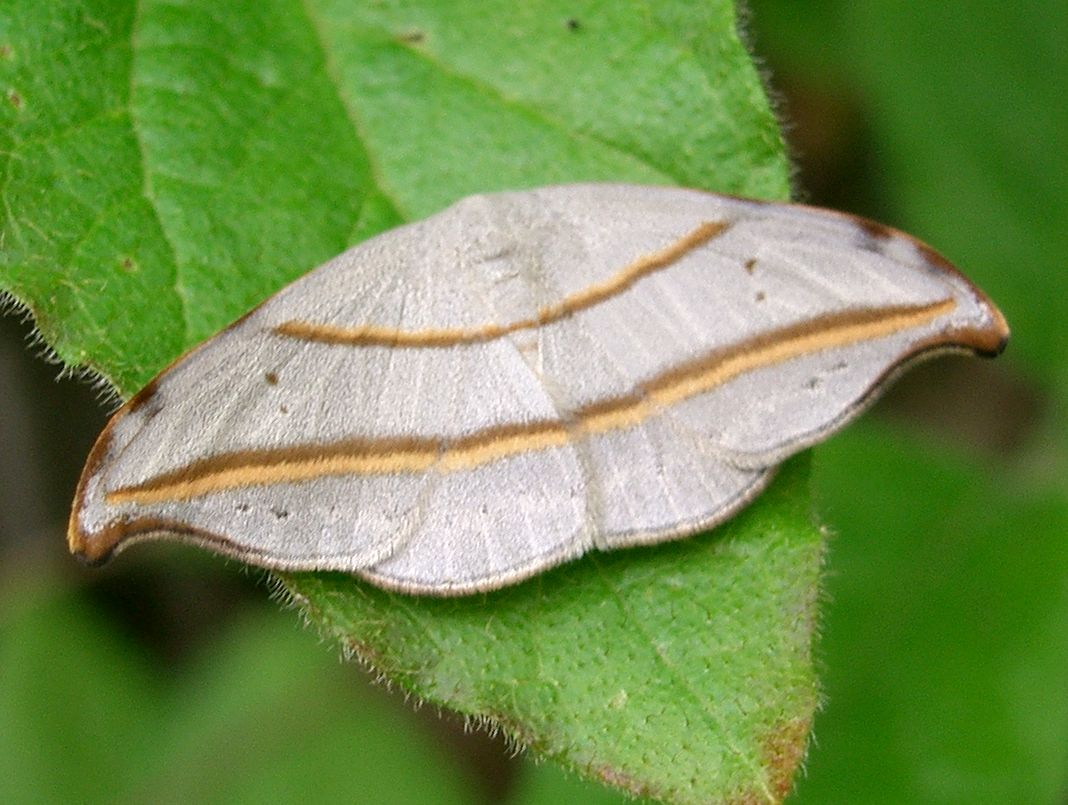

Scientific classification
- Domain: Eukaryota
- Kingdom: Animalia
- Phylum: Arthropoda
- Class: Insecta
- Order: Lepidoptera
- Family: Drepanidae
- Genus: Nordstromia
- Species: N. japonica

Binomial name
- Nordstromia japonica (Moore, 1877)

Synonyms
- Drepana japonica Moore, 1877; Albara sachalinensis Matsumura, 1921; Drepana japonica ab. punctifera Strand, 1911; Albara japonica

= Nordstromia japonica =

Species of hook-tip moth

Nordstromia japonica is a species of moth belonging to the subfamily Drepaninae. It is found in Japan and China (Hunan and Sichuan).

The wingspan is 25–37 mm. Adults are pale vinous lavender grey, with two narrow brown-bordered, yellow, obliquely transverse bands on both wings. The outer band crosses from the apex to the middle of the abdominal margin and the inner band from the middle of the costa to one-third the latter. The costal edge and apex of the forewings are ochreous yellow. There is a slight curved brown streak on the forewings and a small spot on the hindwings at the end of the cell.
