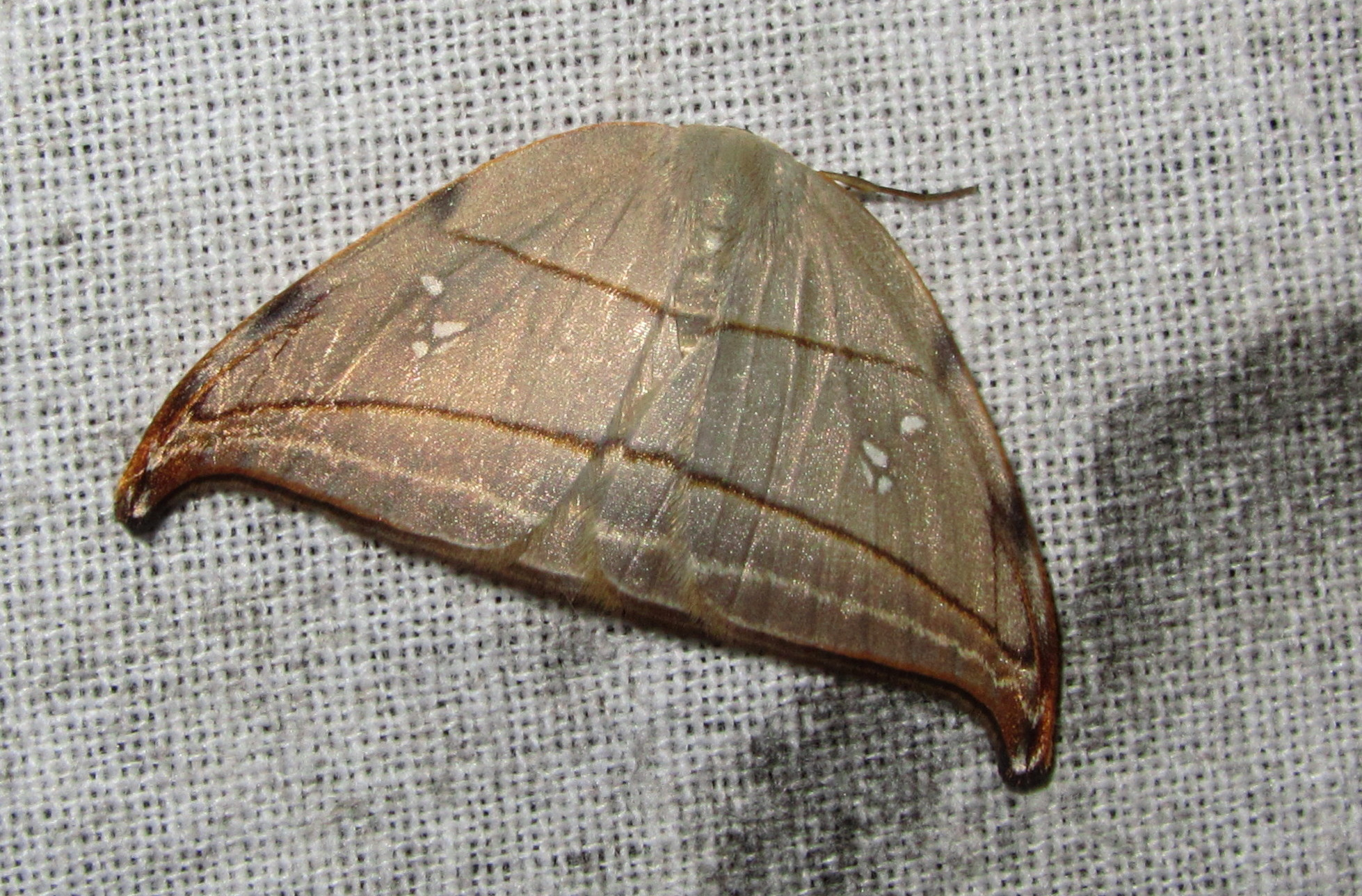

Scientific classification
- Domain: Eukaryota
- Kingdom: Animalia
- Phylum: Arthropoda
- Class: Insecta
- Order: Lepidoptera
- Family: Drepanidae
- Genus: Nordstromia
- Species: N. vira

Binomial name
- Nordstromia vira (Moore, [1866])

Synonyms
- Drepana vira Moore, 1866; Albara erpina C. Swinhoe, 1894; Albara gracillima Warren, 1897; Drepana ocellata Oberthür, 1916; Albara mimetica Warren, 1922; Nordstromia amabilis Bryk, 1943; Nordstromia mimetica pallidina Bryk, 1943

= Nordstromia vira =

Species of hook-tip moth

Nordstromia vira is a moth in the family Drepanidae. It was described by Frederic Moore in 1866. It is found in Myanmar, India (Sikkim, Darjeeling, Assam), Nepal and China (Sichuan, Fujian, Tibet).

The wingspan is about 27 mm. Adults are pale fawn colour, the hindwings pale yellow anteriorly. There are two oblique dark brown lines crossing both wings, between which are three small white discal spots. There is a pale submarginal line and the exterior border of both wings is defined by a brown line.
