= Nordstromia agna =

Scientific classification
- Kingdom: Animalia
- Phylum: Arthropoda
- Clade: Pancrustacea
- Class: Insecta
- Order: Lepidoptera
- Family: Drepanidae
- Genus: Nordstromia
- Species: N. agna

Binomial name
- Nordstromia agna (Oberthür, 1916)

Synonyms
- Drepana agna Oberthür, 1916; Albara agna (Oberthür, 1916)

Species of hook-tip moth

Nordstromia agna is a moth in the family Drepanidae. It was described by Charles Oberthür in 1916. It is found in Sichuan, China.

Nordstromia agna measure 25–35 mm (0.98–1.38 in).
