= Nordstromia guenterriedeli =

Scientific classification
- Kingdom: Animalia
- Phylum: Arthropoda
- Clade: Pancrustacea
- Class: Insecta
- Order: Lepidoptera
- Family: Drepanidae
- Genus: Nordstromia
- Species: N. guenterriedeli

Binomial name
- Nordstromia guenterriedeli Buchsbaum, 2010

Species of hook-tip moth

Nordstromia guenterriedeli is a moth in the family Drepanidae. It was described by Ulf Buchsbaum in 2010. It is found on Sumatra. The type series was collected from primary tropical rainforests of northern Sumatra at elevations of 250–1,200 m (820–3,940 ft).

The wingspan is 23–27 mm.

== Etymology ==
The species is named for Günter Riedel of the Zoologische Staatssammlung München.
