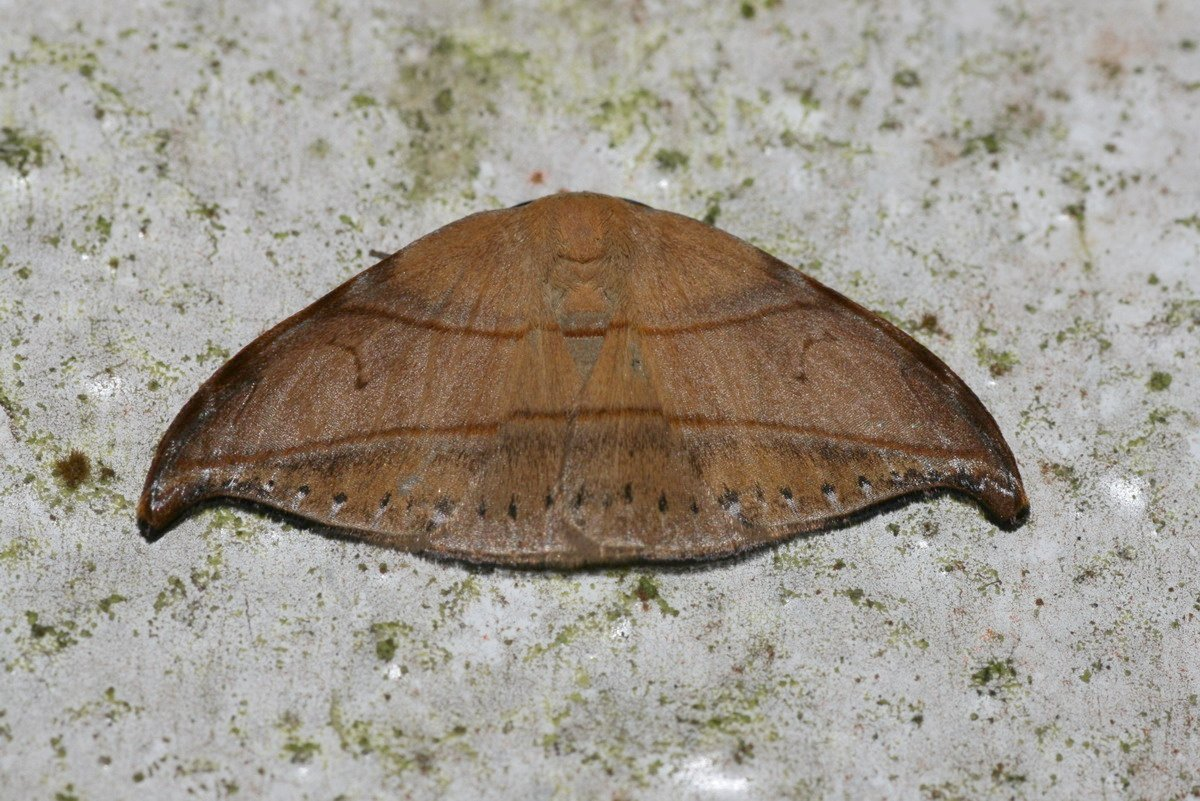

Scientific classification
- Kingdom: Animalia
- Phylum: Arthropoda
- Class: Insecta
- Order: Lepidoptera
- Family: Drepanidae
- Genus: Nordstromia
- Species: N. coffeata

Binomial name
- Nordstromia coffeata Inoue, 1992

= Nordstromia coffeata =

Species of hook-tip moth

Nordstromia coffeata is a moth in the family Drepanidae. It was described by Hiroshi Inoue in 1992. It is found in the Philippines (Luzon, Mindanao), Borneo and Peninsular Malaysia.
