= Nordstromia paralilacina =

Scientific classification
- Kingdom: Animalia
- Phylum: Arthropoda
- Clade: Pancrustacea
- Class: Insecta
- Order: Lepidoptera
- Family: Drepanidae
- Genus: Nordstromia
- Species: N. paralilacina

Binomial name
- Nordstromia paralilacina M. Wang & Yazaki, 2004

Species of hook-tip moth

Nordstromia paralilacina is a moth in the family Drepanidae. It was described by Min Wang and Katsumi Yazaki in 2004. It is found in Guangdong, China.

The wingspan is 29 mm (1.1 in) for the holotype, a male.
