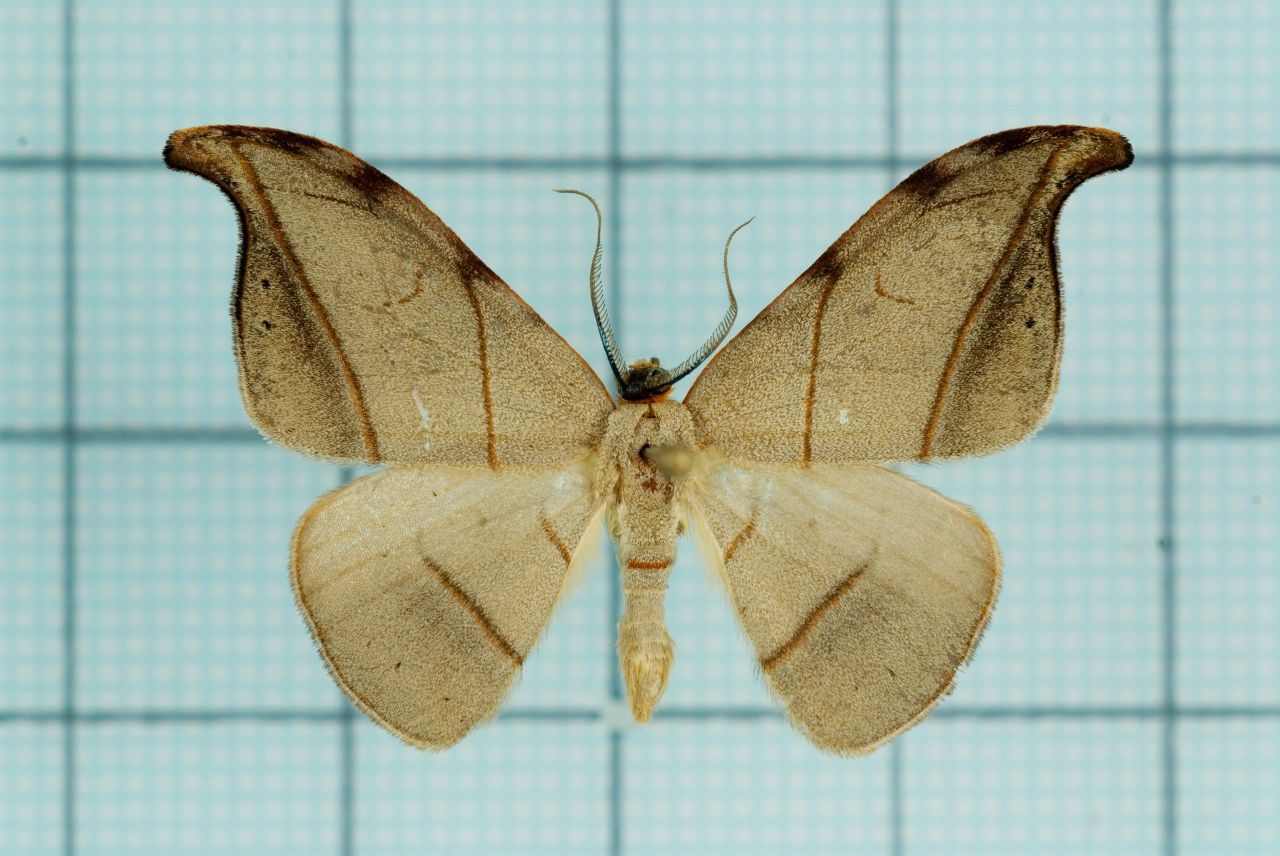

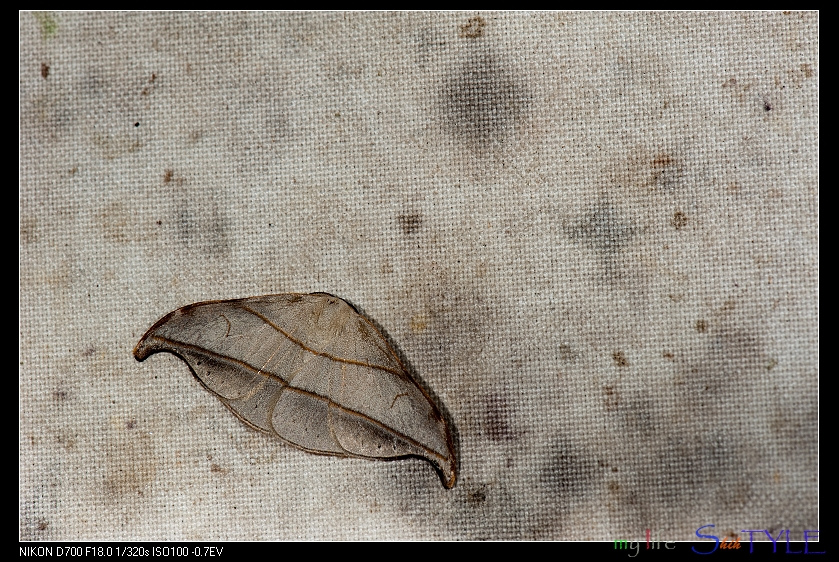

Scientific classification
- Kingdom: Animalia
- Phylum: Arthropoda
- Clade: Pancrustacea
- Class: Insecta
- Order: Lepidoptera
- Family: Drepanidae
- Genus: Nordstromia
- Species: N. semililacina

Binomial name
- Nordstromia semililacina Inoue, 1992

= Nordstromia semililacina =

Species of hook-tip moth

Nordstromia semililacina is a moth in the family Drepanidae. It is endemic to Taiwan.

The wingspan is 32–38 mm. Adults have been recorded in June.
