= Nordstromia sumatrana =

Scientific classification
- Domain: Eukaryota
- Kingdom: Animalia
- Phylum: Arthropoda
- Class: Insecta
- Order: Lepidoptera
- Family: Drepanidae
- Genus: Nordstromia
- Species: N. sumatrana

Binomial name
- Nordstromia sumatrana (Roepke, 1948)

Synonyms
- Allodrepana sumatrana Roepke, 1948

Species of hook-tip moth

Nordstromia sumatrana is a moth in the family Drepanidae. It was described by Walter Karl Johann Roepke in 1948. It is found on Sumatra.
