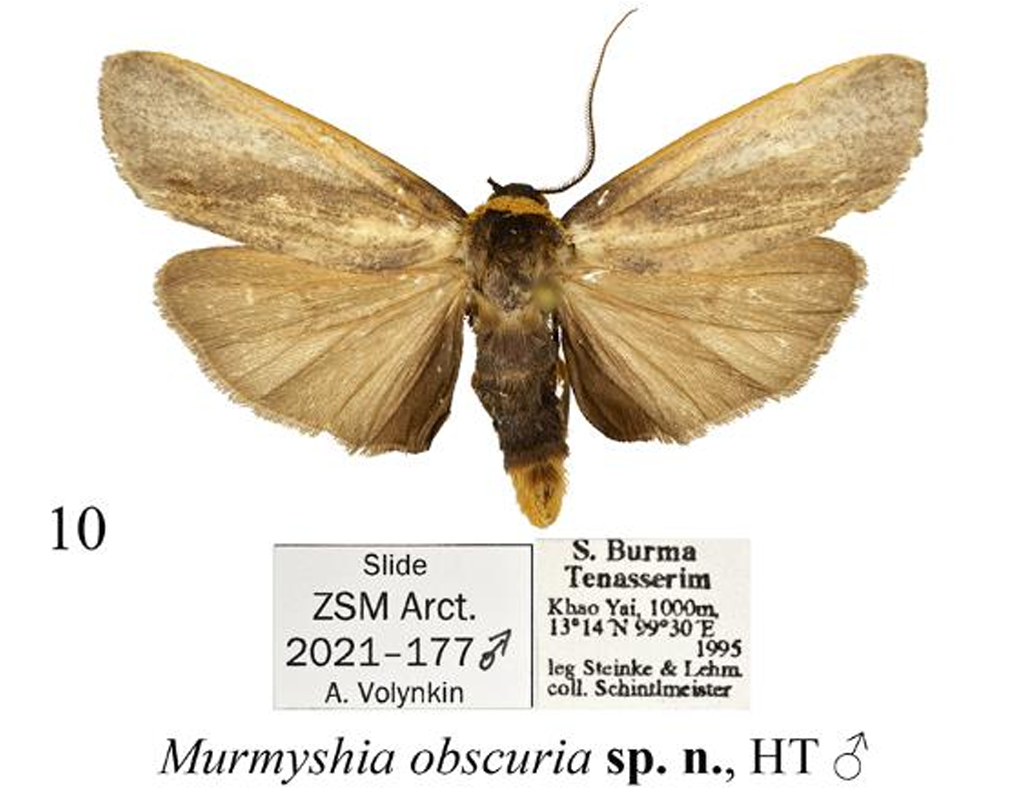
- Male (holotype)
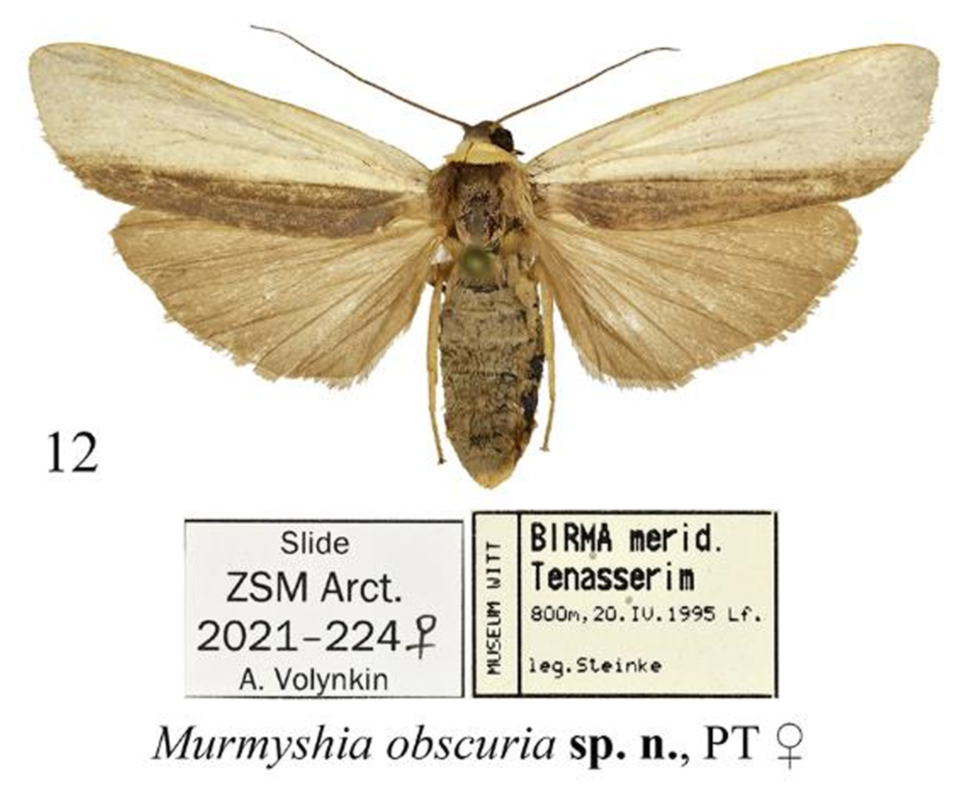
- Female (paratype)

Scientific classification
- Kingdom: Animalia
- Phylum: Arthropoda
- Class: Insecta
- Order: Lepidoptera
- Superfamily: Noctuoidea
- Family: Erebidae
- Subfamily: Arctiinae
- Genus: Murmyshia
- Species: M. obscuria

Binomial name
- Murmyshia obscuria Volynkov, 2024

= Murmyshia obscuria =

Species of moth

Murmyshia obscuria is a species of moth in the family Erebidae. As of June 2024, it has only been found in the northern part of the Malay Peninsula, or more specifically the Taninthayeryi Region of Myanmar.

== Description ==
This species is generally smaller than the other members of the genus, the hindwing is brown unlike the other members that have a lighter tone, the forewing is also darker. The males have a larger stripe that takes up almost half of the forewing, which is only just a relatively thin stripe in the congeners. The length of the forewing in males is 14.0–15.0 mm (0.55–0.59 in) and 16.5–18.0 mm (0.64–0.71 in) in females. The male genitalia are readily distinguished by the two asymmetrical juxta that are subdivided into two narrow lateral lobes (separated by the medial membrane). The other species have symmetrical juxta, dorsally fused lateral lobes. The female genitalia have longer ductus bursae than M. micans with a longer sclerotized subostial area without the dorsal pocket. The corpus bursae are somewhat narrower and bear a slightly longer signum. The female genitalia bear little resemblance with M. unifascia.

== Etymology ==
The specific epithet means "dark" in reference to the general dark coloration of this species and is derived from the Latin adjective "obscurus".

== Genitalia ==
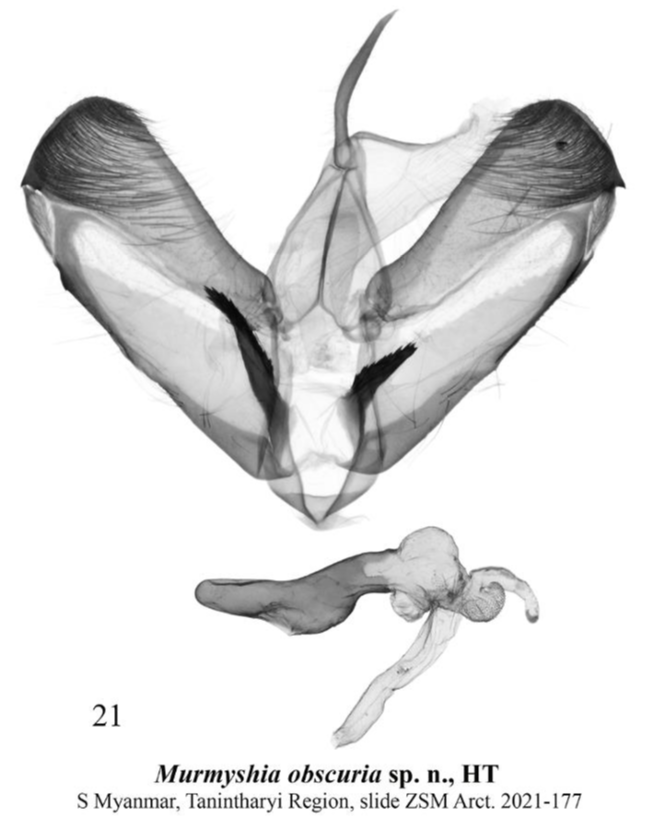
Male genitalia (holotype)

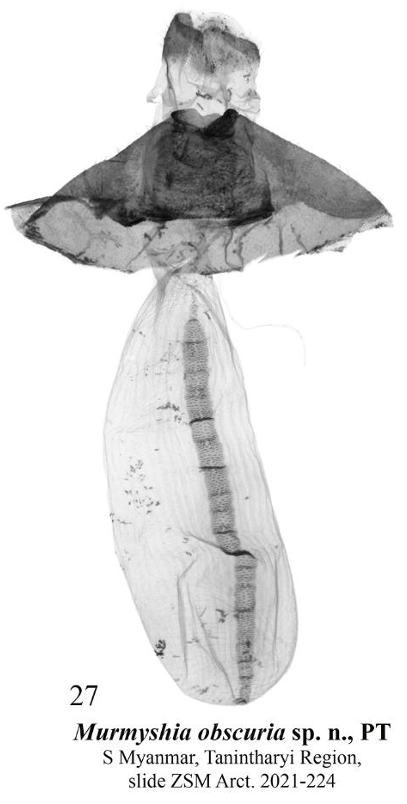
Female genitalia (paratype)
