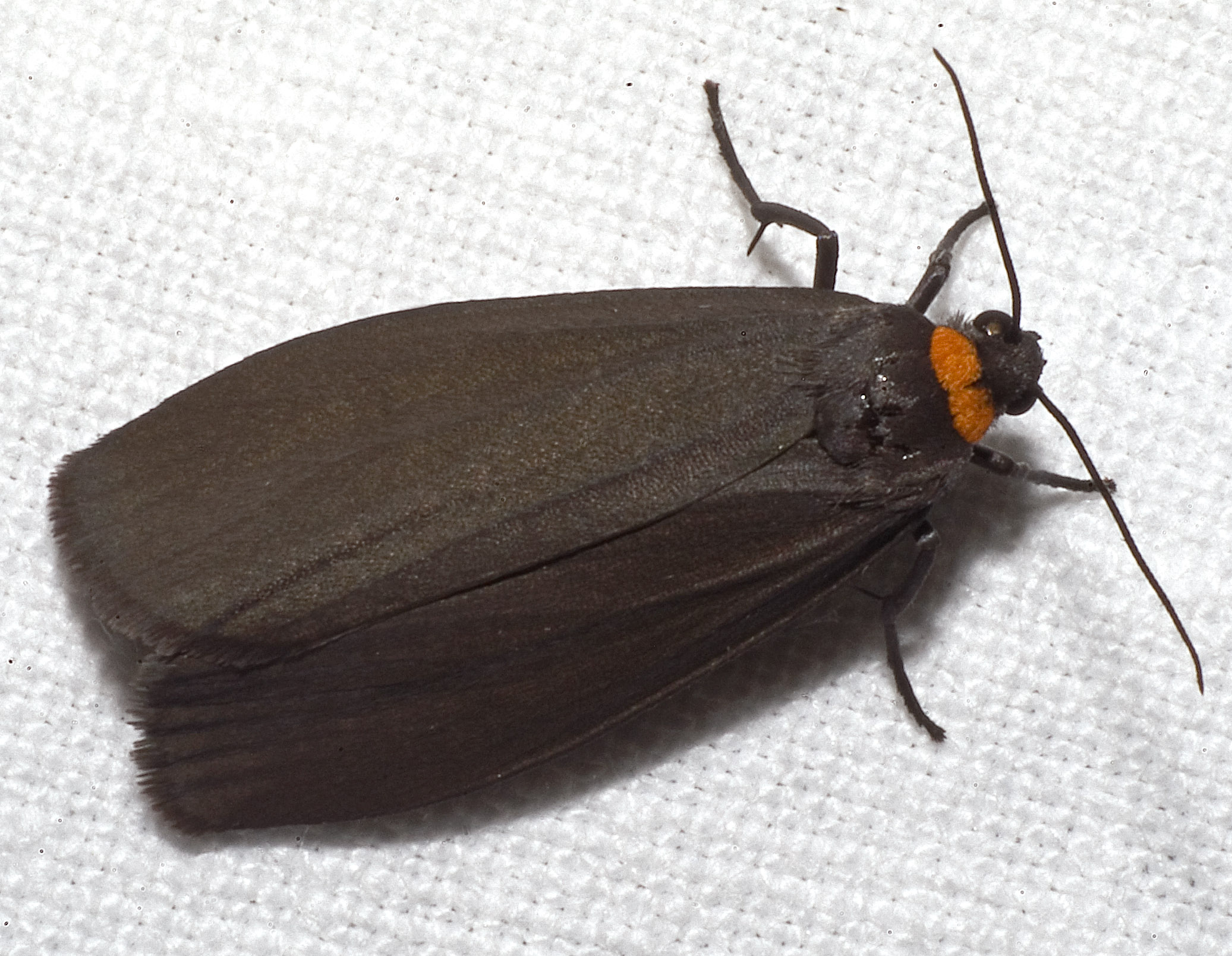
- Atolmis rubricollis

Scientific classification
- Kingdom: Animalia
- Phylum: Arthropoda
- Clade: Pancrustacea
- Class: Insecta
- Order: Lepidoptera
- Superfamily: Noctuoidea
- Family: Erebidae
- Subfamily: Arctiinae
- Subtribe: Lithosiina
- Genus: Atolmis; Hübner, 1819

= Atolmis =

Genus of moths

Atolmis is a monotypic genus of tiger moths in the family Erebidae. The genus was erected by Jacob Hübner in 1819.

== Species ==
- Atolmis rubricollis Linnaeus, 1758 – red-necked footman

== Former species ==
- Atolmis flavicollis, now Gnamptonychia flavicollis (Druce, 1885)
- Atolmis unifascia, now Murmyshia unifascia (Hampson, 1901)
