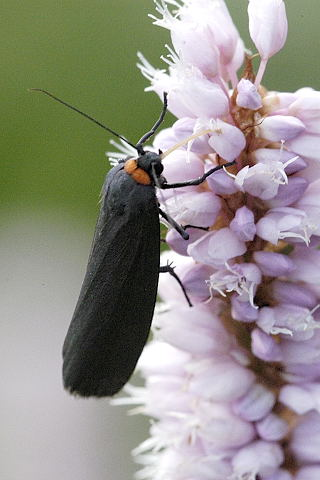

Scientific classification
- Kingdom: Animalia
- Phylum: Arthropoda
- Clade: Pancrustacea
- Class: Insecta
- Order: Lepidoptera
- Superfamily: Noctuoidea
- Family: Erebidae
- Subfamily: Arctiinae
- Genus: Atolmis
- Species: A. rubricollis

Binomial name
- Atolmis rubricollis (Linnaeus, 1758)

Synonyms
- Phalaena rubricollis Linnaeus, 1758; Atolmis rubricollis ab. canescens Strand, 1919; Atolmis flavicollis Neuburger; Atolmis rubicollis Linnaeus, 1761

= Atolmis rubricollis =

Red-necked footman

Species of moth

Atolmis rubricollis, the red-necked footman, is a small moth of the family Erebidae. It is found in the summer in forested regions of Europe and Northern Asia. This moth was first described by Carl Linnaeus in his 1758 10th edition of Systema Naturae.

== Description ==
The red-necked footman is a small moth that is mostly charcoal grey or deep dark brown (fresh specimens almost black), but has a conspicuous orange thorax, part of which is visible behind the black head as an orange-red collar. The hindwings are brownish grey. The antennae and legs are black and the end of the abdomen is yellowish orange or golden yellow. The wings are tightly folded together around the body and have pleated, squared-off ends. The wingspan is 25 to 35 mm (1.0 to 1.4 in) and the length of the forewings is 15 to 18 mm (0.6 to 0.7 in).

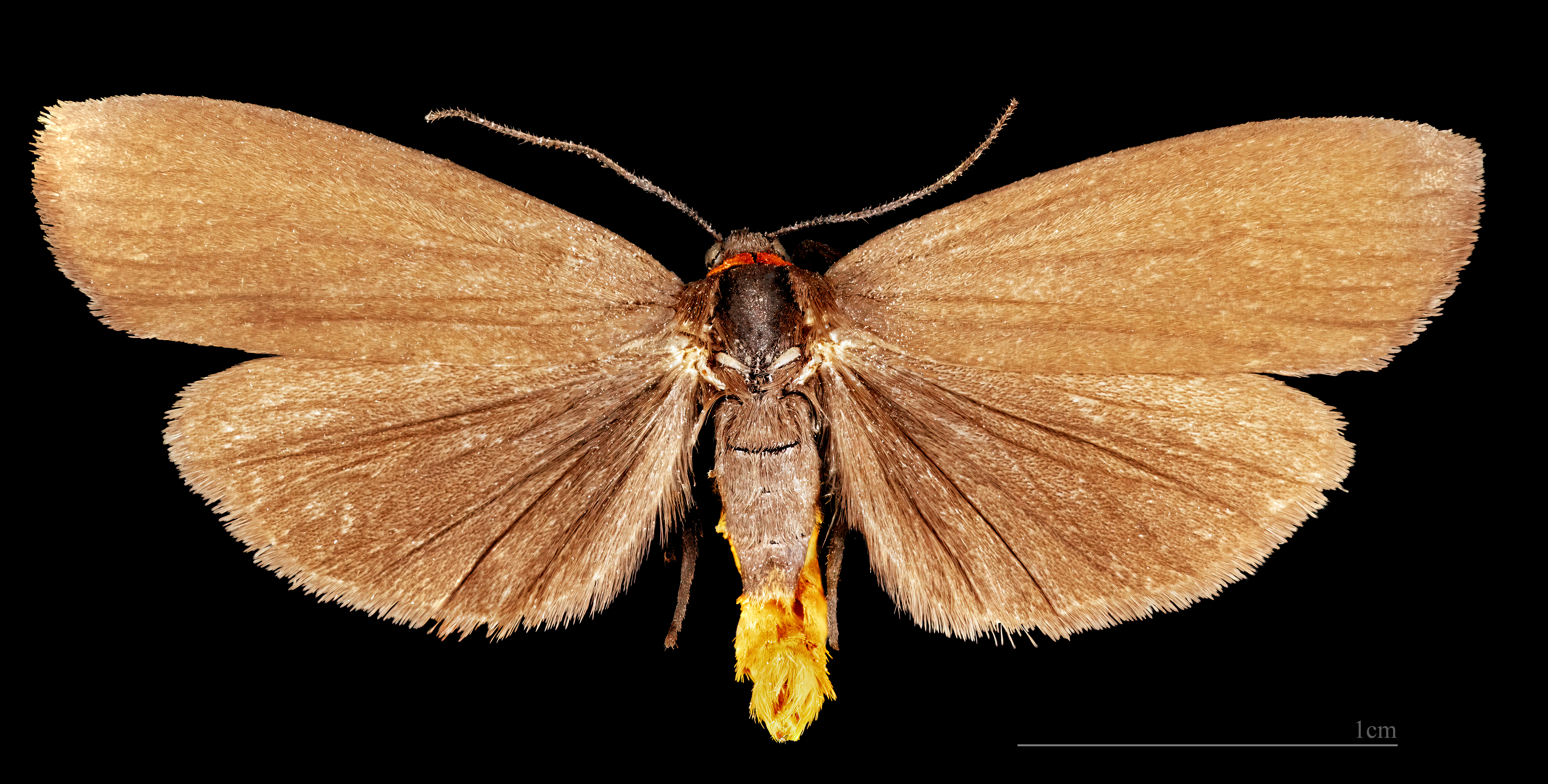
♂

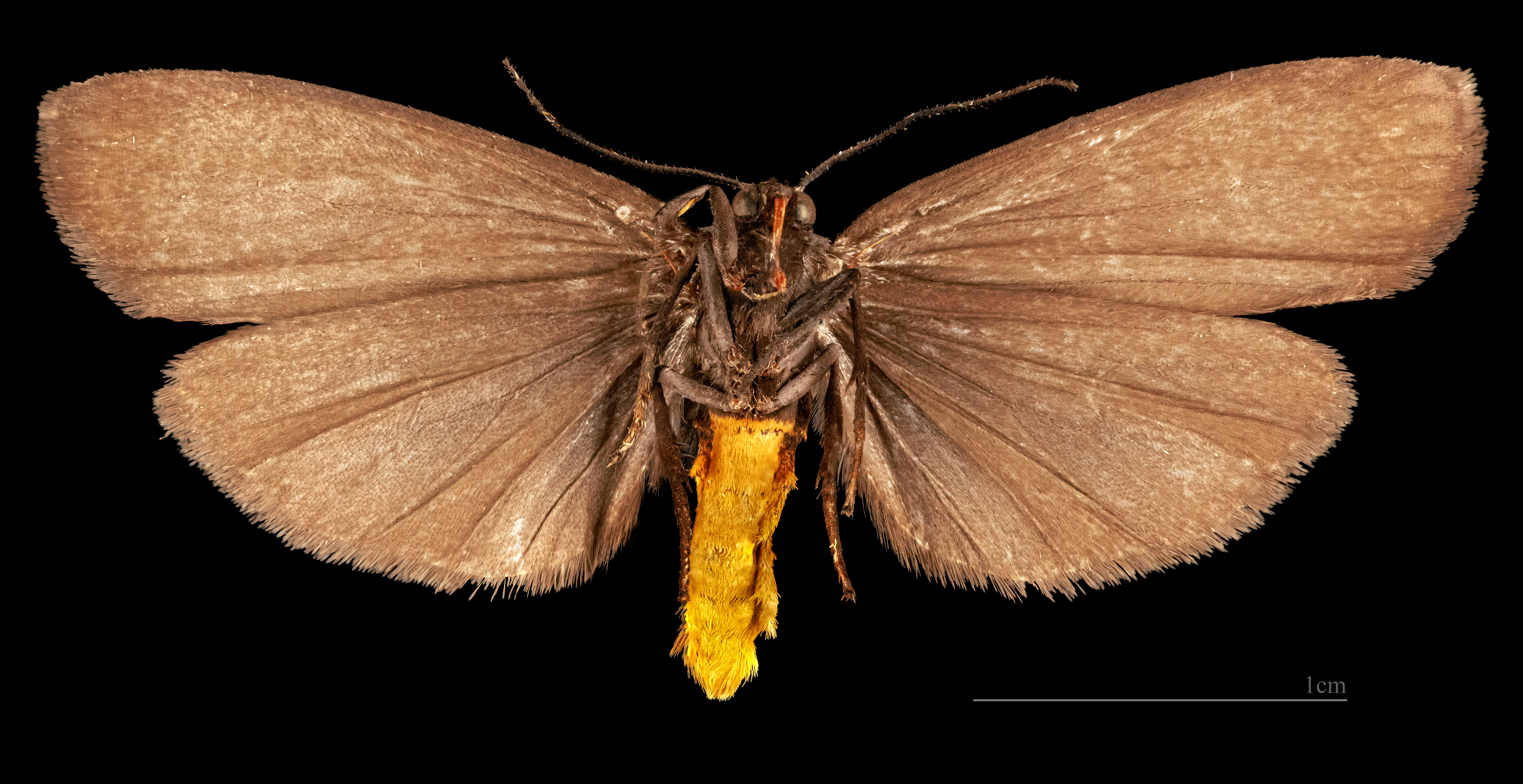
♂ △

Wilhelm Neuburger named Romanian specimens as the synonym Atolmis flavicollis; these were less dark brown and with a light yellow instead of a red collar.

== Life cycle ==
The white eggs of the red-necked footman are laid in small groups in crevices in the branches of trees, especially those of old firs. The caterpillars feed on lichens growing on the trunks and branches of trees, and can be found between August and October. They grow to a length of about 27 mm (1.1 in). Their head is black with a bold diagonal white stripe on either side. Their main colour is dark greenish grey marbled with cream. Each segment bears six tiny reddish yellow warts which bear black hairs. They pupate before winter sets in and overwinter as glossy brownish red pupae, in a loose cocoon buried among moss and leaf litter. The moths fly between May and July depending on their location. They are mostly nocturnal, being attracted to lights, but also sometimes fly by day. Sometimes the moths feed at scabiouses and other flowers, but they usually rest during the day on the long branches of firs overhanging paths in woods, where they may be obtained by beating the branches over a net.

== Distribution ==
The red-necked footman is found in Europe south to the Mediterranean and east across the Palearctic to temperate Asia, including Siberia as far east as the Amur River and China. It is found in parts of Ireland, and in the United Kingdom is present in the south-westerly counties of England and Wales. Records from other parts of the United Kingdom probably represent accidentals and not breeding populations. It is a woodland species found in deciduous and coniferous woodland, especially on spruce trees, but also on pine, oak and beech. It likes to be near streams in cool wooded valleys in upland regions.

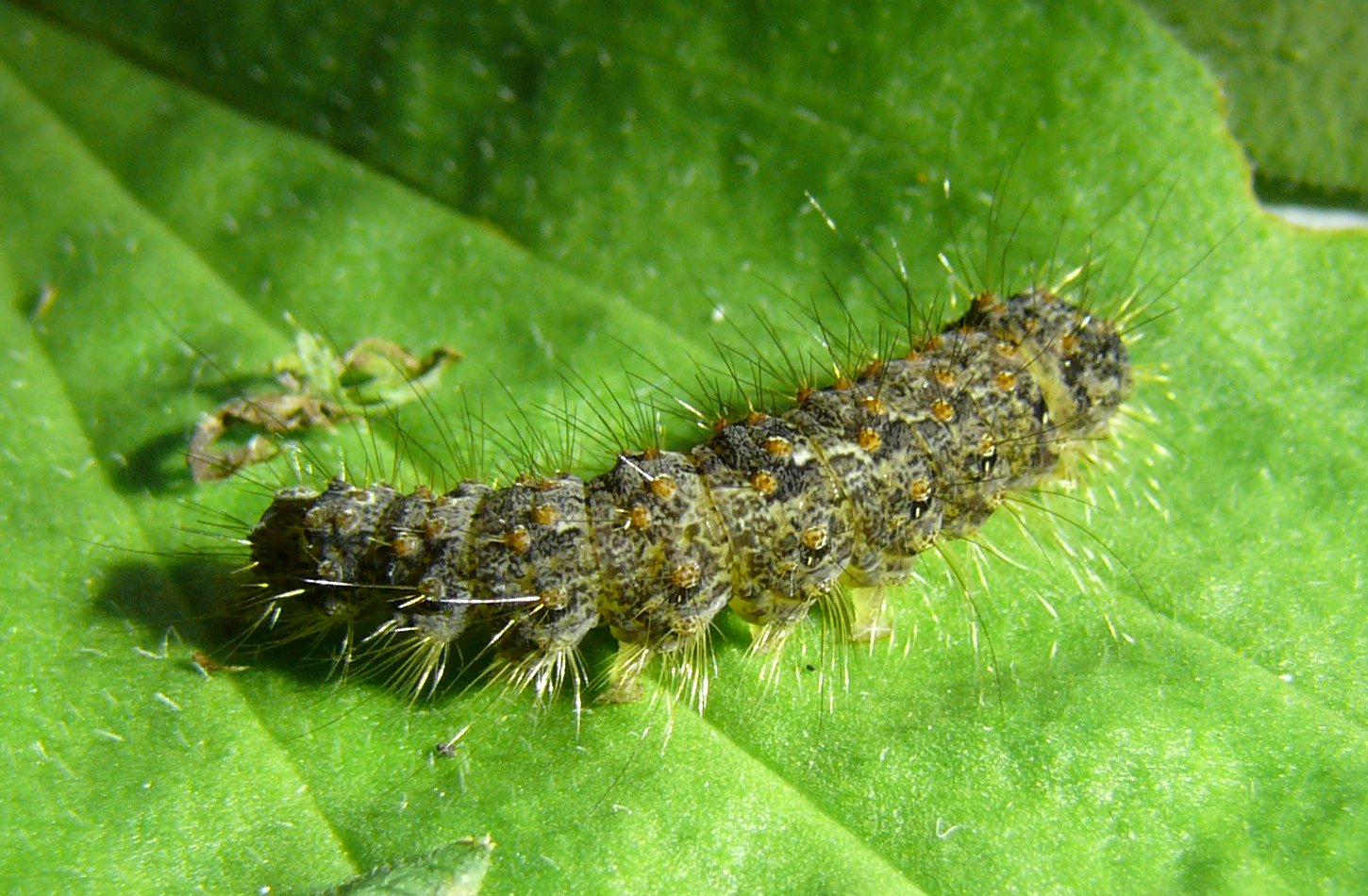
Caterpillar

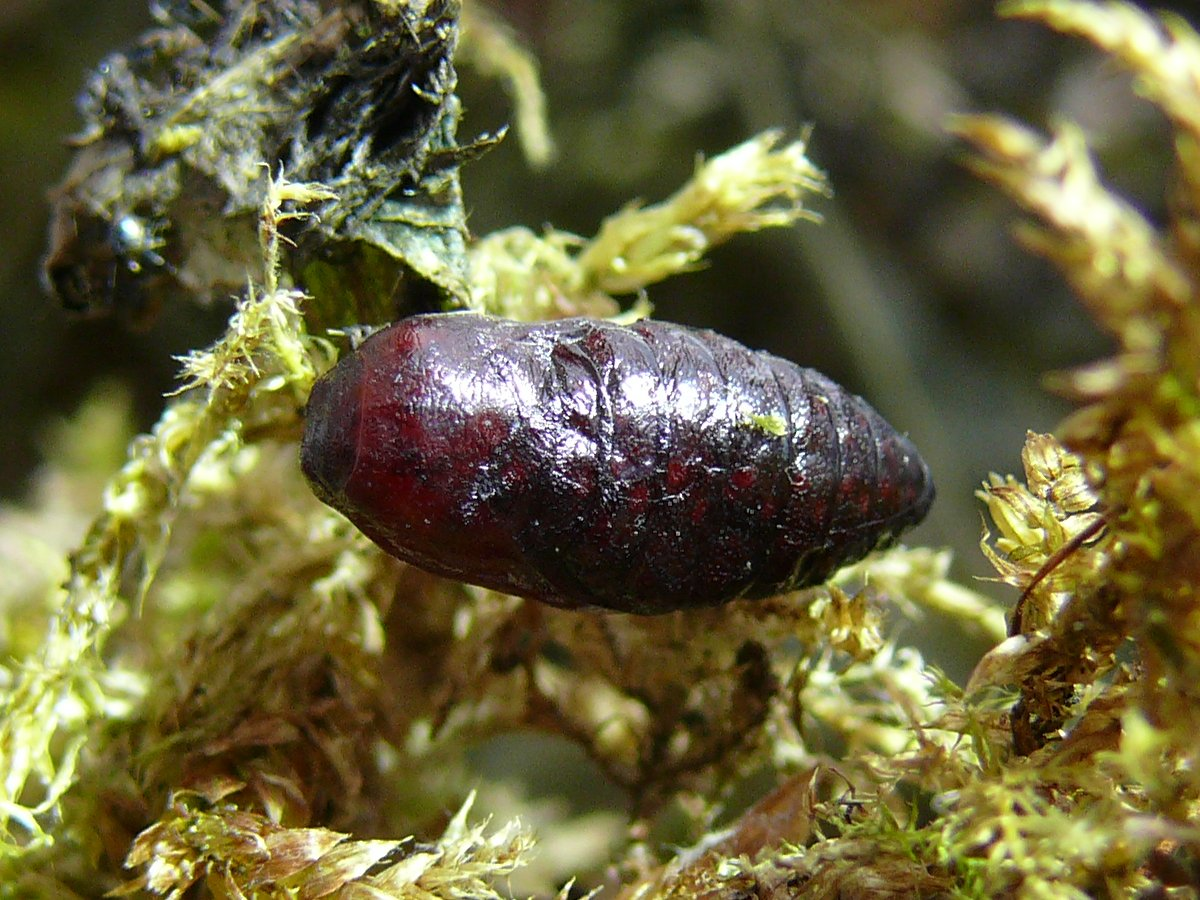
Pupa

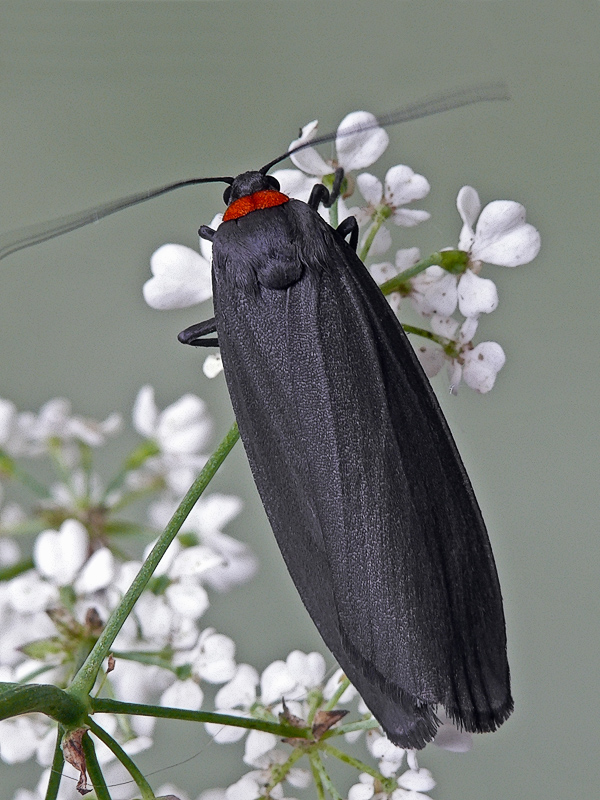
Adult feeding

== Notes ==
- This article incorporates matter translated from the Dutch Wikipedia
- This article incorporates matter translated from the German Wikipedia
