= Murmyshia =

Scientific classification
- Domain: Eukaryota
- Kingdom: Animalia
- Phylum: Arthropoda
- Class: Insecta
- Order: Lepidoptera
- Superfamily: Noctuoidea
- Family: Erebidae
- Subfamily: Arctiinae
- Tribe: Lithosiini
- Genus: Murmyshia; Volynkin, 2024

Genus of moths

Murmyshia is a genus of tiger moths in the family Erebidae. The species that represent the genus are found in Sundaland, reaching into southern Myanmar and Sumbawa, but are not found in Borneo.

== Species ==
The following species are included as of June 2024:

- Murmyshia micans (Pagenstecher, 1895)
- Murmyshia obscuria Volynkin, 2024
- Murmyshia unifascia (Hampson, 1901)

== Etymology ==
The name of the genus is derived from that of a family member of the describing author: Georgy 'Murmyshik' Foss.
