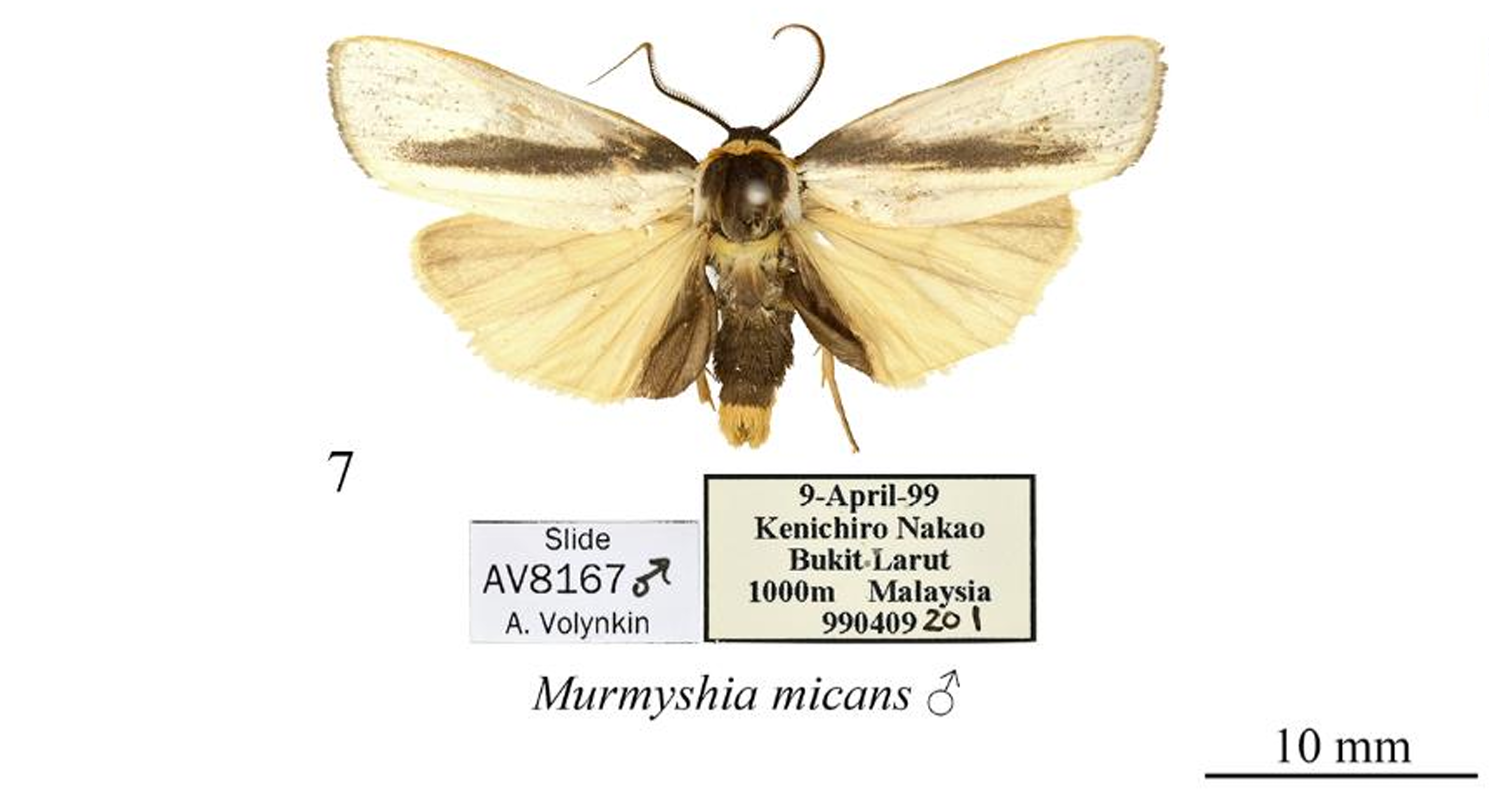
- Male
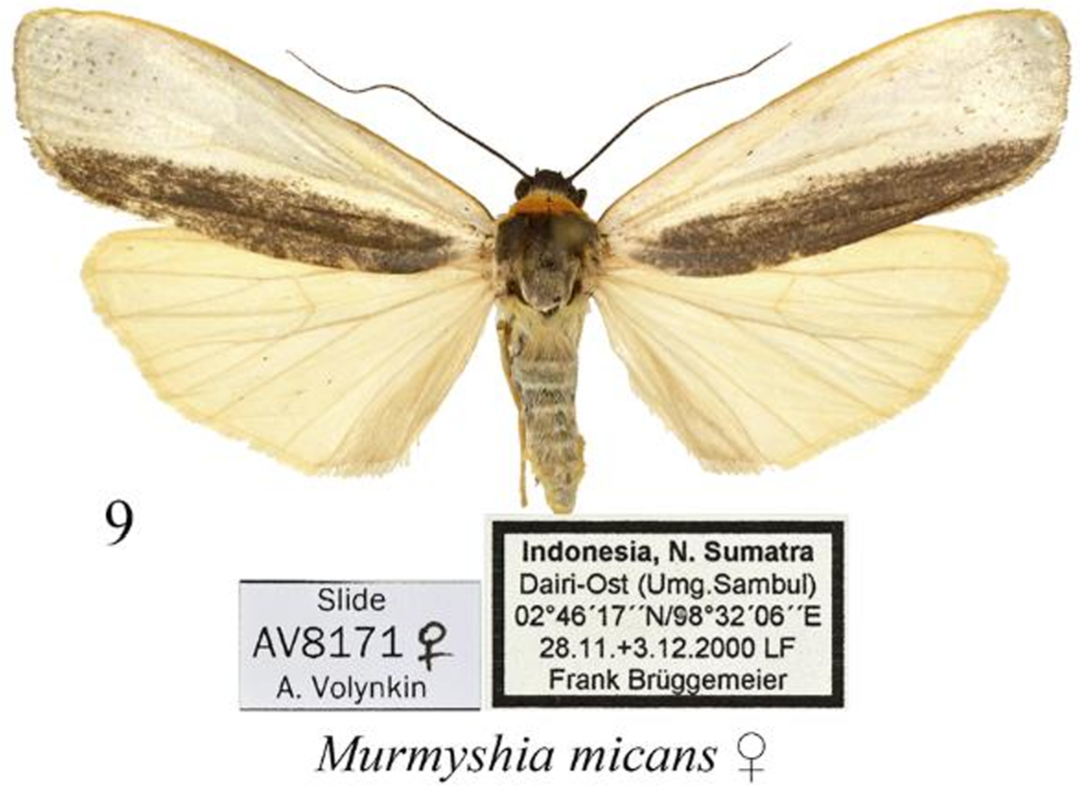
- Female

Scientific classification
- Kingdom: Animalia
- Phylum: Arthropoda
- Class: Insecta
- Order: Lepidoptera
- Superfamily: Noctuoidea
- Family: Erebidae
- Subfamily: Arctiinae
- Genus: Murmyshia
- Species: M. micans

Binomial name
- Murmyshia micans (Pagenstecher, 1895)

Synonyms
- Agylla dirabdus Rothschild, 1920; Paraona micans Pagenstecher, 1895; Lithosia micans Pagenstecher, 1895; Eilema micans Pagenstecher, 1895

= Murmyshia micans =

Species of moth

Murmyshia micans is a moth of the family Erebidae. It is found on Java.
