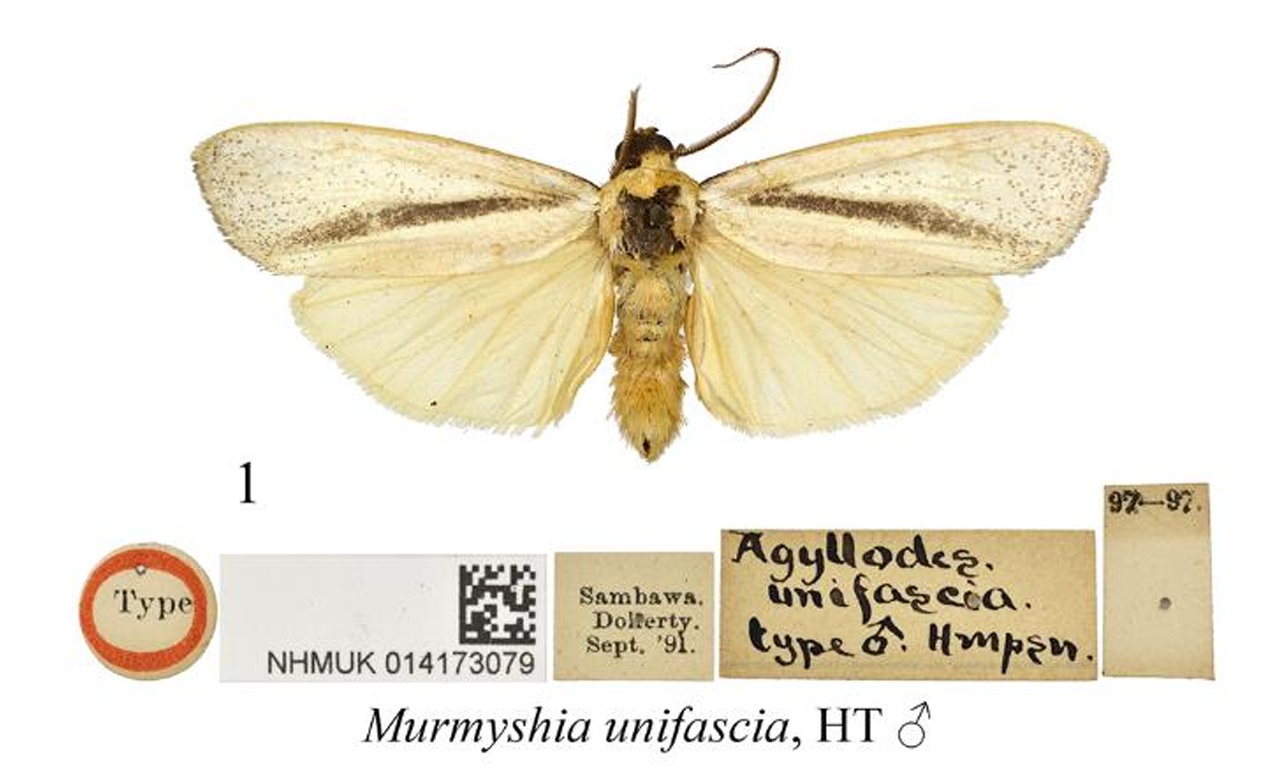
- Male (holotype)
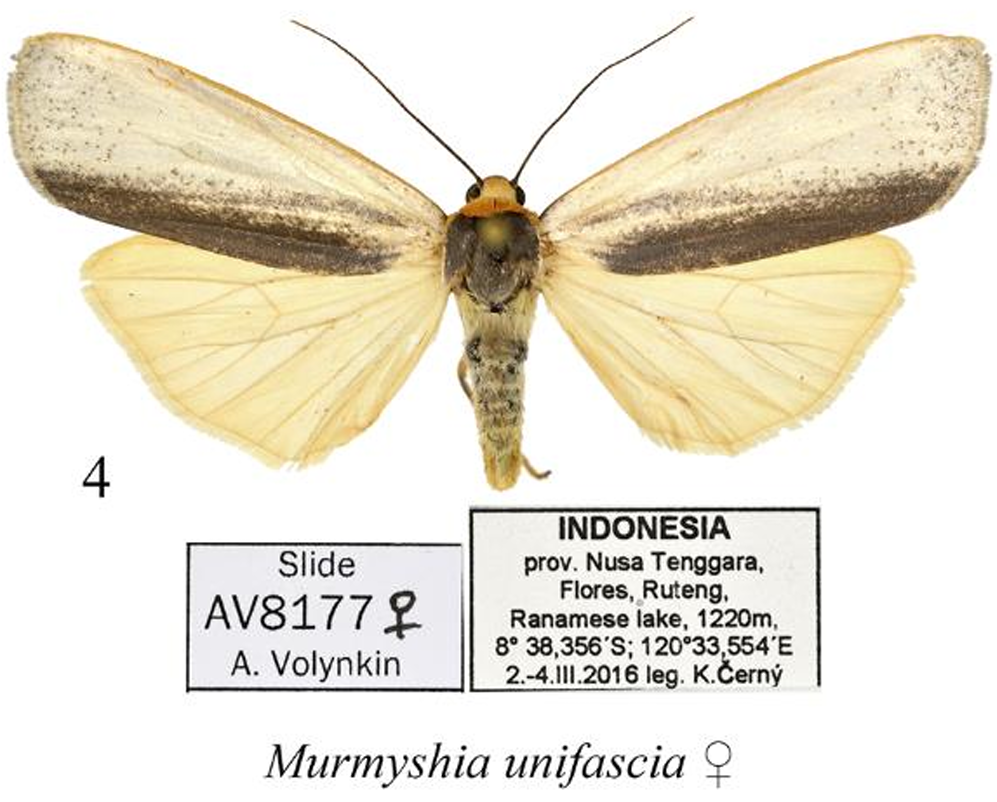
- Female

Scientific classification
- Kingdom: Animalia
- Phylum: Arthropoda
- Class: Insecta
- Order: Lepidoptera
- Superfamily: Noctuoidea
- Family: Erebidae
- Subfamily: Arctiinae
- Genus: Murmyshia
- Species: M. unifascia

Binomial name
- Murmyshia unifascia (Hampson, 1901)

= Murmyshia unifascia =

Species of moth

Murmyshia unifascia is a moth of the family Erebidae first described by George Hampson in 1901. It is found on Sumbawa in Indonesia. It belonged to the genus Atolmis for a long time but was moved to a newly erected genus Murmyshia in the year 2024.
