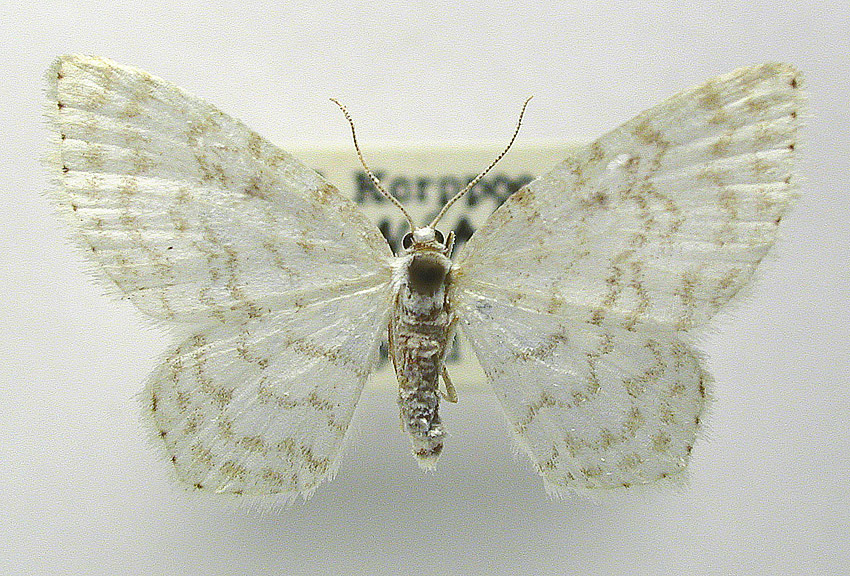
- Asthena albulata

Scientific classification
- Kingdom: Animalia
- Phylum: Arthropoda
- Clade: Pancrustacea
- Class: Insecta
- Order: Lepidoptera
- Family: Geometridae
- Tribe: Asthenini
- Genus: Asthena; Hübner, 1825

Synonyms
- Roessleria Breyer, 1869

= Asthena =

Genus of moths

Asthena is a genus of moths in the family Geometridae.

== Species ==
- Asthena albidaria (Leech, 1897)
- Asthena albosignata (Moore, 1888)
- Asthena albulata – small white wave (Hufnagel, 1767)
- Asthena amurensis (Staudinger, 1897)
- Asthena anseraria (Herrich-Schäffer, 1855)
- Asthena lactularia (Herrich-Schäffer, 1855)
- Asthena lassa Prout, 1926
- Asthena livida (Warren, 1896)
- Asthena melanosticta Wehrli, 1924
- Asthena nymphaeata Staudinger, 1897
- Asthena ochrifasciaria (Leech, 1897)
- Asthena octomacularia Leech, 1897
- Asthena opedogramma (Prout, 1926)
- Asthena plenaria (Leech, 1897)
- Asthena sachalinensis Matsumura, 1925
- Asthena tchratchraria (Oberthür, 1893)
- Asthena undulata (Wileman, 1915)

== Excluded species ==
The following species have been excluded from the genus, but have not been reassigned to another genus.

- Asthena argentipuncta Warren, 1906
- Asthena argyrorrhytes Prout, 1916
- Asthena aurantiaca Prout, 1926
- Asthena eurychora Prout, 1928
- Asthena subditaria Warren, 1906

== Former species ==
- Asthena chionata is now Hydrelia chionata (Lederer, 1870)
- Asthena distinctaria is now Pseudostegania distinctaria (Leech, 1897)
- Asthena percandidata is now Hydrelia percandidata (Christoph, 1893)
- Asthena straminearia is now Pseudostegania straminearia (Leech, 1897)
- Asthena yargongaria is now Pseudostegania yargongaria (Oberthur, 1916)
