= Pseudostegania =

Scientific classification
- Kingdom: Animalia
- Phylum: Arthropoda
- Class: Insecta
- Order: Lepidoptera
- Family: Geometridae
- Tribe: Asthenini
- Genus: Pseudostegania; Butler, 1881

Genus of moths

Pseudostegania is a genus of moths in the family Geometridae. It is often treated as a synonym of Asthena.

== Species ==
- Pseudostegania burmaensis D.Y. Xue & H.X. Han, 2010
- Pseudostegania defectata (Christoph, 1881)
- Pseudostegania distinctaria (Leech, 1897)
- Pseudostegania lijiangensis D.Y. Xue & Stüning, 2010
- Pseudostegania qinlingensis D.Y. Xue & H.X. Han, 2010
- Pseudostegania straminearia (Leech, 1897)
- Pseudostegania yargongaria (Oberthür, 1916)
- Pseudostegania zhoui D.Y. Xue & H.X. Han, 2010
