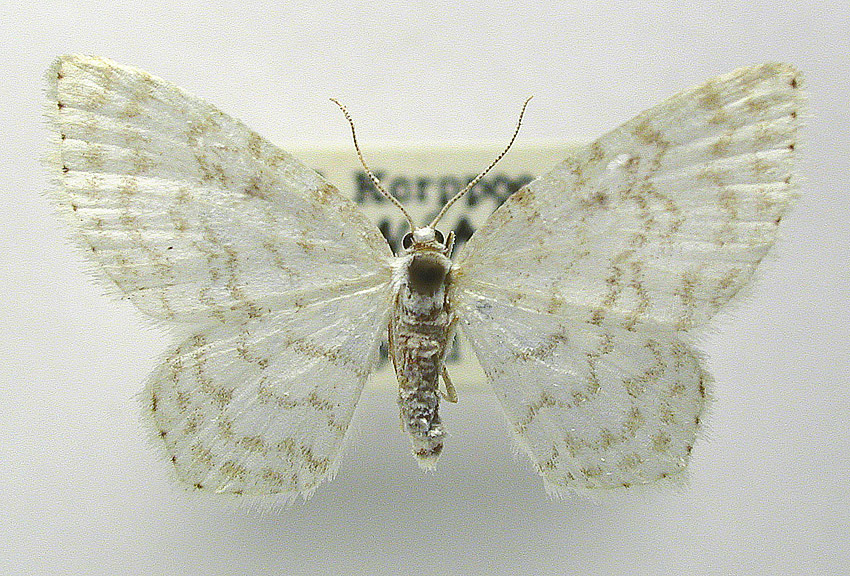

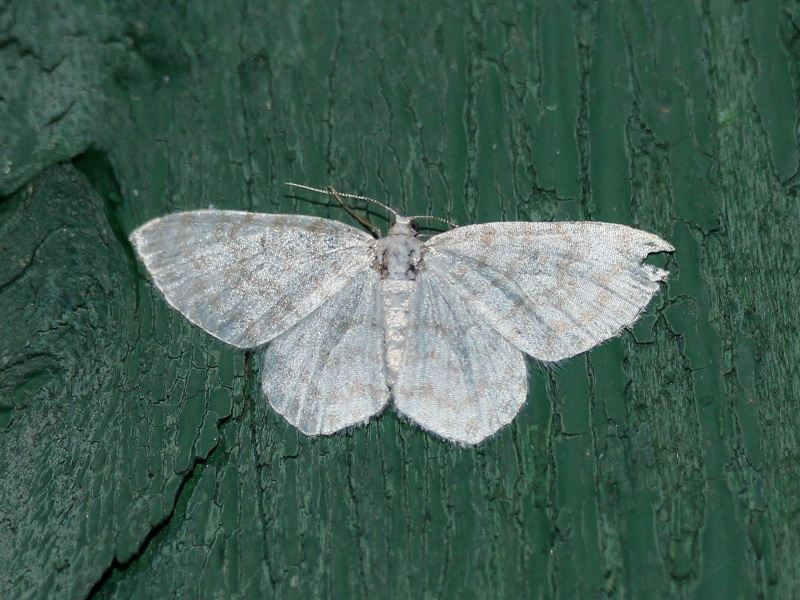

Scientific classification
- Kingdom: Animalia
- Phylum: Arthropoda
- Clade: Pancrustacea
- Class: Insecta
- Order: Lepidoptera
- Family: Geometridae
- Genus: Asthena
- Species: A. albulata

Binomial name
- Asthena albulata (Hufnagel, 1767)

Synonyms
- Phalaena albulata Hufnagel, 1767; Geometra candidata Denis & Schiffermüller, 1775

= Asthena albulata =

Species of moth

Asthena albulata, the small white wave, is a moth of the family Geometridae. It is known from all of Europe and is also present in the Near East.

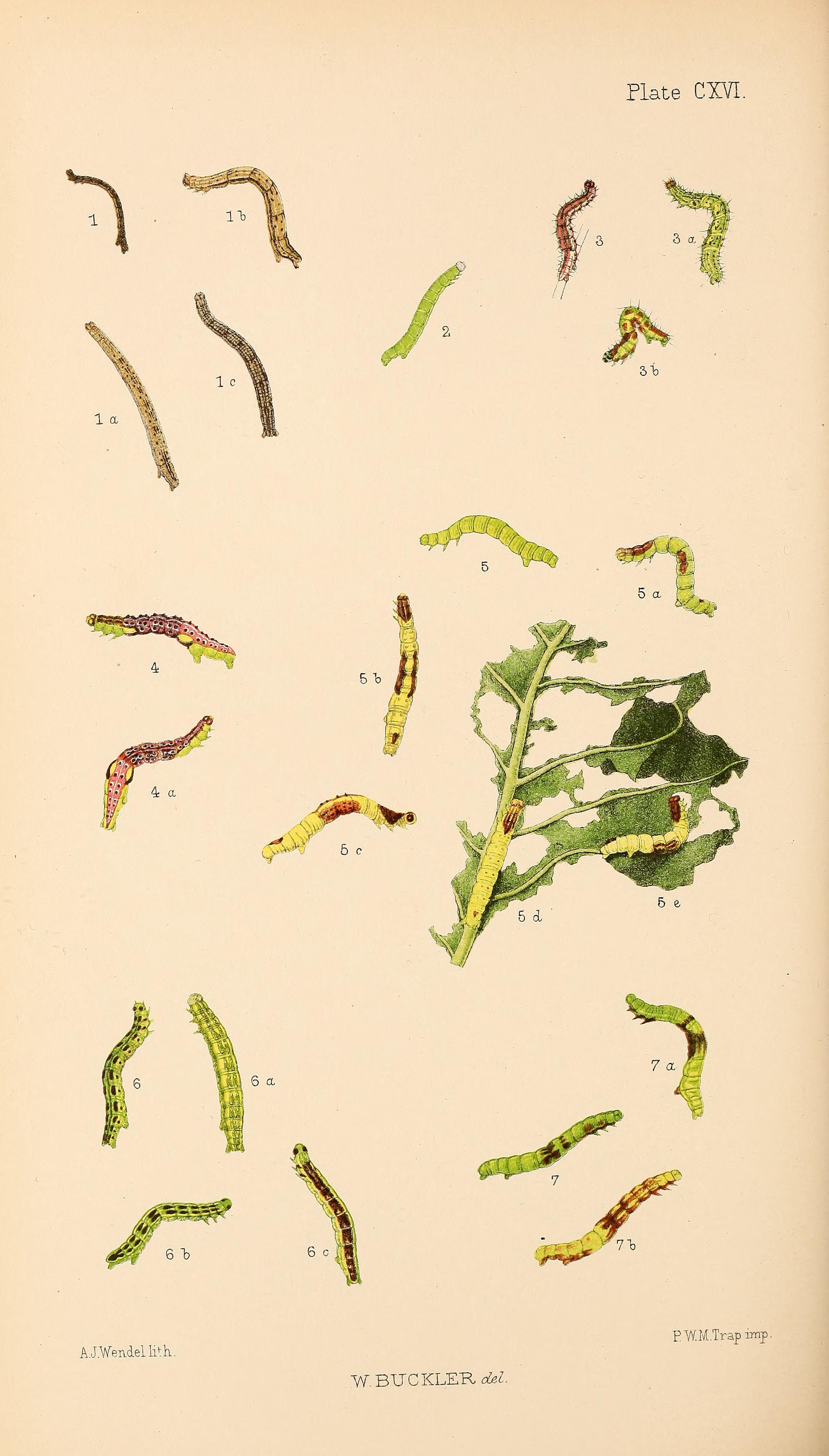
Figs. 3,3a,3b Larvae in various stages of growth

The wingspan is 14–18 mm. The ground colour of the wings is white (silky in appearance). There are fine brown cross-lines across both forewings and hindwings and a row of black dots along the margin of both wings. Asthena amurensis Stgr., from the Eastern Palearctic, is smaller, with distinct discal dots but wanting those of the distal margin.

The larva is slender, pale with large red spots, with quite long, dark setae.

There are two generations per year with adults on wing from mid-April to August.

The larvae feed on Corylus avellana, Betula and sometimes Carpinus betulus. Larvae can be found from May to September. It overwinters as a pupa.
