= Pseudostegania zhoui =

Scientific classification
- Kingdom: Animalia
- Phylum: Arthropoda
- Clade: Pancrustacea
- Class: Insecta
- Order: Lepidoptera
- Family: Geometridae
- Genus: Pseudostegania
- Species: P. zhoui

Binomial name
- Pseudostegania zhoui D.Y. Xue & H.X. Han, 2010

Species of moth

Pseudostegania zhoui is a moth in the family Geometridae. It is found in China (Sichuan).
