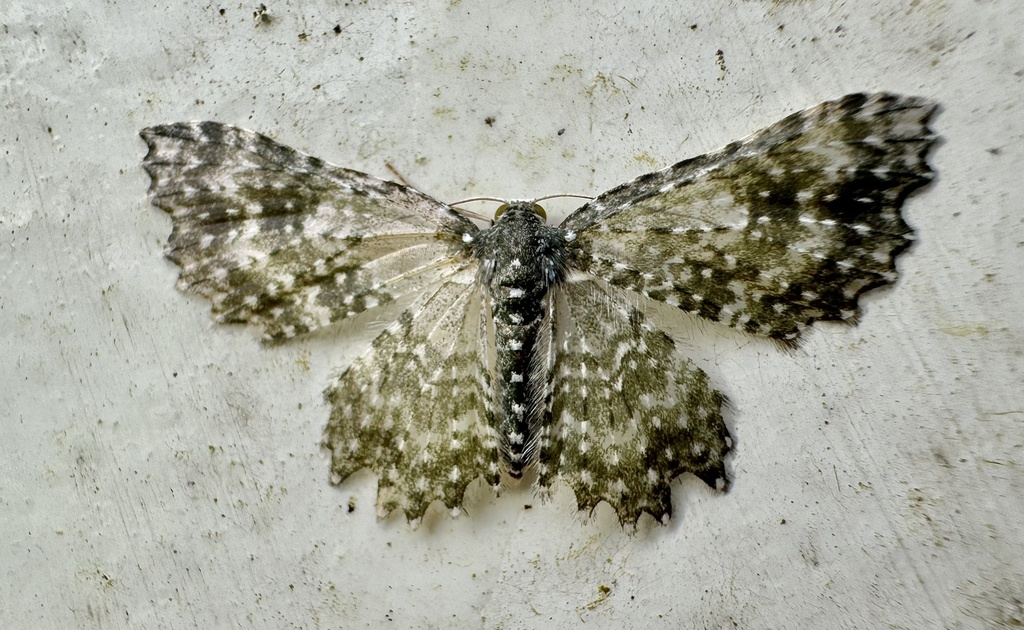
- Bihastina subviridata

Scientific classification
- Kingdom: Animalia
- Phylum: Arthropoda
- Clade: Pancrustacea
- Class: Insecta
- Order: Lepidoptera
- Family: Geometridae
- Tribe: Asthenini
- Genus: Bihastina; Prout, 1916

= Bihastina =

Genus of moths

Bihastina is a genus of moths in the family Geometridae. They occur in New Guinea.

== Species ==
There are seven accepted species:

- Bihastina albolucens Prout, 1916
- Bihastina argentipuncta (Warren, 1906)
- Bihastina aurantiaca (Prout, 1926)
- Bihastina eurychora (Prout, 1928)
- Bihastina papuensis (Warren, 1906)
- Bihastina subviridata (Bethune-Baker, 1915)
- Bihastina viridata (Warren, 1906)
