= Asthena albosignata =

Scientific classification
- Kingdom: Animalia
- Phylum: Arthropoda
- Clade: Pancrustacea
- Class: Insecta
- Order: Lepidoptera
- Family: Geometridae
- Genus: Asthena
- Species: A. albosignata

Binomial name
- Asthena albosignata (Moore, 1888)

Synonyms
- Idea albosignata Moore, 1888

Species of moth

Asthena albosignata is a moth in the family Geometridae first described by Frederic Moore in 1888. It is found in India, Bhutan, China and Kashmir.
