= Pseudostegania burmaensis =

Scientific classification
- Kingdom: Animalia
- Phylum: Arthropoda
- Clade: Pancrustacea
- Class: Insecta
- Order: Lepidoptera
- Family: Geometridae
- Genus: Pseudostegania
- Species: P. burmaensis

Binomial name
- Pseudostegania burmaensis D.Y. Xue & H.X. Han, 2010

Species of moth

Pseudostegania burmaensis is a moth in the family Geometridae. It is found in Burma.
