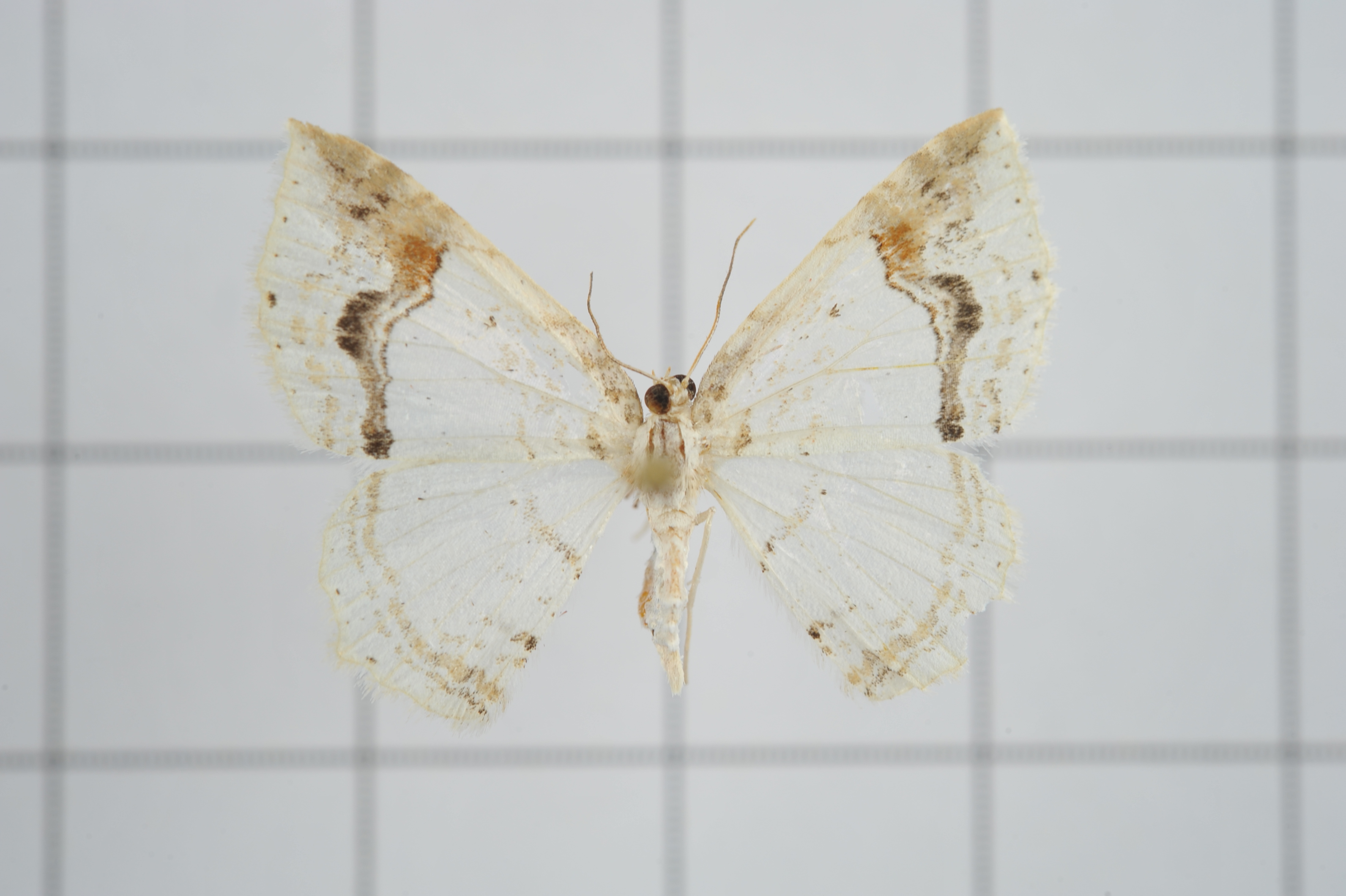

Scientific classification
- Kingdom: Animalia
- Phylum: Arthropoda
- Clade: Pancrustacea
- Class: Insecta
- Order: Lepidoptera
- Family: Geometridae
- Genus: Asthena
- Species: A. undulata

Binomial name
- Asthena undulata (Wileman, 1915)

Synonyms
- Leucoctenorrhoe undulata Wileman, 1915; Asthena geminimaculata Wehrli, 1923

= Asthena undulata =

Species of moth

Asthena undulata is a moth in the family Geometridae. It is found in Taiwan, Korea and Japan.
