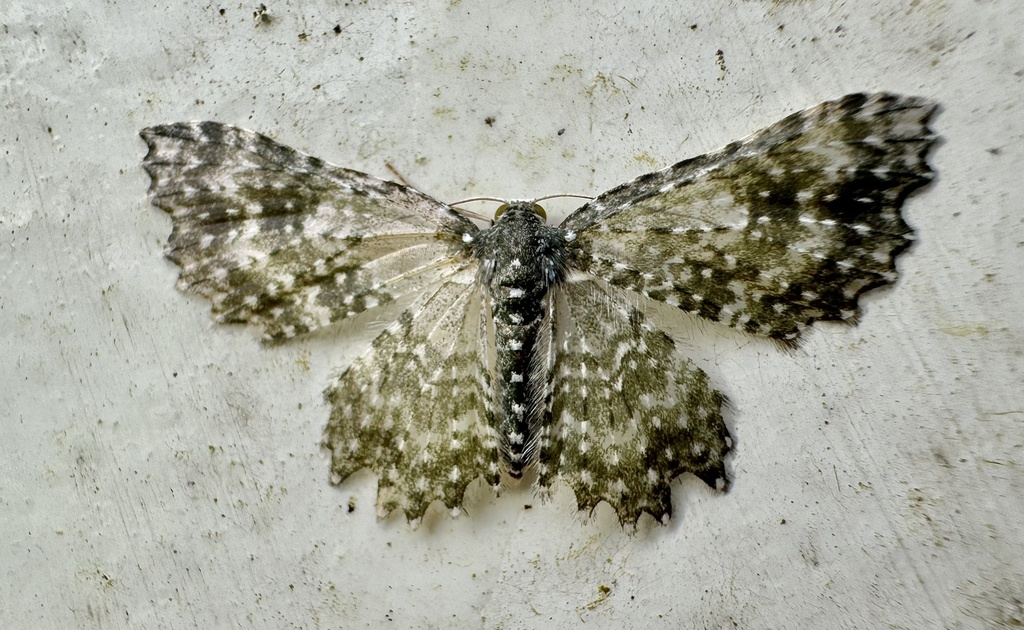

Scientific classification
- Kingdom: Animalia
- Phylum: Arthropoda
- Clade: Pancrustacea
- Class: Insecta
- Order: Lepidoptera
- Family: Geometridae
- Genus: Bihastina
- Species: B. subviridata

Binomial name
- Bihastina subviridata (Bethune-Baker, 1915)

Synonyms
- Hastina subviridata Bethune-Baker, 1915; Bihastina mera Prout, 1926

= Bihastina subviridata =

Species of moth

Bihastina subviridata is a moth in the family Geometridae. It was described by George Thomas Bethune-Baker in 1915. It is found in Papua New Guinea.

== Appearance ==
This species appears as a moth with a green overall color and wavey spots that give off a consistent fairy ring pattern with symmetrical lined stripes intertwining. The wings are fringed 7 times at different tips on each wing. The eyes are large and brown colored.

== Live records ==
There are two live records on the internet taken by Dan Mantle via iNaturalist observation.
