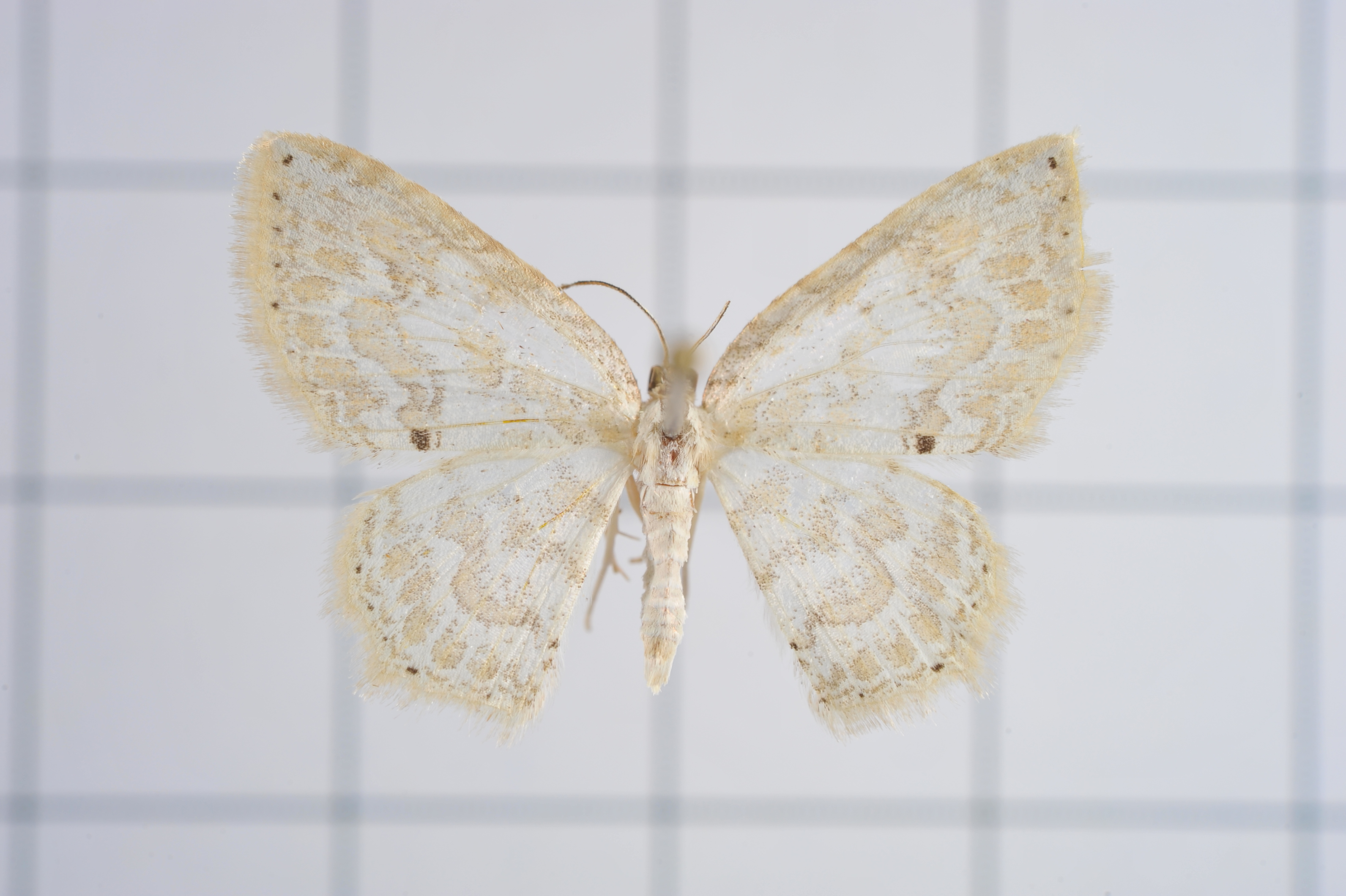

Scientific classification
- Kingdom: Animalia
- Phylum: Arthropoda
- Clade: Pancrustacea
- Class: Insecta
- Order: Lepidoptera
- Family: Geometridae
- Genus: Asthena
- Species: A. melanosticta

Binomial name
- Asthena melanosticta Wehrli, 1924

= Asthena melanosticta =

Species of moth

Asthena melanosticta is a moth in the family Geometridae. It is found in Taiwan.
