= Asthena tchratchraria =

Scientific classification
- Kingdom: Animalia
- Phylum: Arthropoda
- Clade: Pancrustacea
- Class: Insecta
- Order: Lepidoptera
- Family: Geometridae
- Genus: Asthena
- Species: A. tchratchraria

Binomial name
- Asthena tchratchraria (Oberthür, 1893)

Synonyms
- Acidalia tchratchraria Oberthür, 1893; Hydrelia tchratchraria

Species of moth

Asthena tchratchraria is a moth in the family Geometridae first described by Charles Oberthür in 1893. It is found in Myanmar and China.
