= Asthena livida =

Scientific classification
- Kingdom: Animalia
- Phylum: Arthropoda
- Clade: Pancrustacea
- Class: Insecta
- Order: Lepidoptera
- Family: Geometridae
- Genus: Asthena
- Species: A. livida

Binomial name
- Asthena livida (Warren, 1896)

Synonyms
- Autallacta livida Warren, 1896

Species of moth

Asthena livida is a moth in the family Geometridae. It is found in India.
