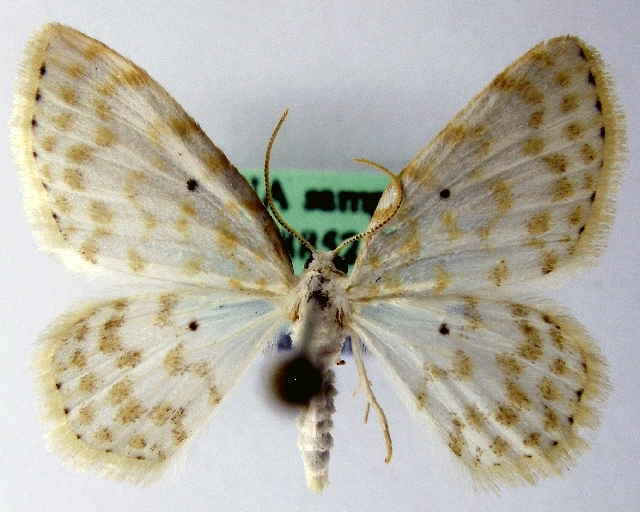

Scientific classification
- Kingdom: Animalia
- Phylum: Arthropoda
- Clade: Pancrustacea
- Class: Insecta
- Order: Lepidoptera
- Family: Geometridae
- Genus: Asthena
- Species: A. anseraria

Binomial name
- Asthena anseraria (Herrich-Schäffer, 1855)

Synonyms
- Arrhostis anseraria Herrich-Schäffer, 1855; Asthena anseraria candidissima Staudinger, 1897; Asthena corneata Chrétien, 1894; Cidaria soldaria Turati, 1879

= Asthena anseraria =

Species of moth

Asthena anseraria is a moth of the family Geometridae. It is known from most of Europe (except Great Britain, Ireland, the Iberian Peninsula, part of the Balkan Peninsula, Norway, Sweden and northern Russia), east to Korea.

The wingspan is about 18 mm, and adults are on wing from May to July in two generations per year.

The larvae feed on Cornus sanguinea. Larvae can be found in June and August. Larvae that live on green leaves are green and larvae that live on red leaves are red. It overwinters as a pupa.

== Subspecies ==
- Asthena anseraria anseraria (Palaearctic)
- Asthena anseraria corculina Butler, 1878 (Japan, China)
- Asthena anseraria lactularia (Herrich-Schäffer, 1855)
