= Asthena argyrorrhytes =

Scientific classification
- Kingdom: Animalia
- Phylum: Arthropoda
- Clade: Pancrustacea
- Class: Insecta
- Order: Lepidoptera
- Family: Geometridae
- Genus: Asthena
- Species: A. argyrorrhytes

Binomial name
- Asthena argyrorrhytes L. B. Prout, 1916

Species of moth

"Asthena" argyrorrhytes is a moth in the family Geometridae first described by Louis Beethoven Prout in 1916. It is found on New Guinea.
