= Bihastina papuensis =

Scientific classification
- Kingdom: Animalia
- Phylum: Arthropoda
- Clade: Pancrustacea
- Class: Insecta
- Order: Lepidoptera
- Family: Geometridae
- Genus: Bihastina
- Species: B. papuensis

Binomial name
- Bihastina papuensis (Warren, 1906)

Synonyms
- Hydrelia papuensis Warren, 1906; Poecilasthena papuensis (Warren, 1906)

Species of moth

Bihastina papuensis is a moth in the family Geometridae. It was described by William Warren in 1906. It is found in Papua New Guinea.

The wingspan is about 24 mm (0.94 in) for males.
