= Asthena ochrifasciaria =

Scientific classification
- Kingdom: Animalia
- Phylum: Arthropoda
- Clade: Pancrustacea
- Class: Insecta
- Order: Lepidoptera
- Family: Geometridae
- Genus: Asthena
- Species: A. ochrifasciaria

Binomial name
- Asthena ochrifasciaria Leech, 1897

Species of moth

Asthena ochrifasciaria is a moth in the family Geometridae. It is found in the Russian Far East, Korea and Japan.
