= Asthena plenaria =

Scientific classification
- Kingdom: Animalia
- Phylum: Arthropoda
- Clade: Pancrustacea
- Class: Insecta
- Order: Lepidoptera
- Family: Geometridae
- Genus: Asthena
- Species: A. plenaria

Binomial name
- Asthena plenaria (Leech, 1897)

Synonyms
- Hydrelia plenaria Leech, 1897

Species of moth

Asthena plenaria is a moth in the family Geometridae. It is found in China.
