= Asthena lassa =

Scientific classification
- Kingdom: Animalia
- Phylum: Arthropoda
- Clade: Pancrustacea
- Class: Insecta
- Order: Lepidoptera
- Family: Geometridae
- Genus: Asthena
- Species: A. lassa

Binomial name
- Asthena lassa Prout, 1926

Species of moth

Asthena lassa is a moth in the family Geometridae. It is found in Myanmar.
