= Asthena lactularia =

Scientific classification
- Kingdom: Animalia
- Phylum: Arthropoda
- Clade: Pancrustacea
- Class: Insecta
- Order: Lepidoptera
- Family: Geometridae
- Genus: Asthena
- Species: A. lactularia

Binomial name
- Asthena lactularia (Herrich-Schäffer, 1855)

Synonyms
- Hydrelia lactularia Herrich-Schäffer, 1855; Asthena lacturaria; Asthena nymphulata Guenée, 1858; Asthena albeolata Rambur, 1866

Species of moth

Asthena lactularia is a moth in the family Geometridae first described by Gottlieb August Wilhelm Herrich-Schäffer in 1855. It is found in southern Spain.

== Taxonomy ==
The species is sometimes treated as a subspecies of Asthena anseraria.
