= Bihastina albolucens =

Scientific classification
- Kingdom: Animalia
- Phylum: Arthropoda
- Clade: Pancrustacea
- Class: Insecta
- Order: Lepidoptera
- Family: Geometridae
- Genus: Bihastina
- Species: B. albolucens

Binomial name
- Bihastina albolucens L. B. Prout, 1916

Species of moth

Bihastina albolucens is a moth in the family Geometridae. It was described by Louis Beethoven Prout in 1916. It is known from West Papua in Western New Guinea.
