= Asthena subditaria =

Scientific classification
- Kingdom: Animalia
- Phylum: Arthropoda
- Clade: Pancrustacea
- Class: Insecta
- Order: Lepidoptera
- Family: Geometridae
- Genus: Asthena
- Species: A. subditaria

Binomial name
- Asthena subditaria Warren, 1906

Species of moth

"Asthena" subditaria is a species of Lepidoptera in the family geometrid moth. Geometridae first described by William Warren in 1906. It is found on New Guinea.

== Taxonomy ==
The species does not belong to the genus Asthena or even the tribe Asthenini, but has not been moved to another genus.
