= Pseudostegania defectata =

Scientific classification
- Domain: Eukaryota
- Kingdom: Animalia
- Phylum: Arthropoda
- Class: Insecta
- Order: Lepidoptera
- Family: Geometridae
- Genus: Pseudostegania
- Species: P. defectata

Binomial name
- Pseudostegania defectata (Christoph, 1881)

Synonyms
- Cidaria defectata Christoph, 1881; Larentia defectata; Asthena defectata; Pseudostegania chrysidia Butler, 1881

Species of moth

Pseudostegania defectata is a moth in the family Geometridae. It is found in the Russian Far East and Japan.

The wingspan is 21–25 mm.
