= Asthena sachalinensis =

Scientific classification
- Kingdom: Animalia
- Phylum: Arthropoda
- Clade: Pancrustacea
- Class: Insecta
- Order: Lepidoptera
- Family: Geometridae
- Genus: Asthena
- Species: A. sachalinensis

Binomial name
- Asthena sachalinensis (Matsumura, 1925)

Synonyms
- Acidalia sachalinensis Matsumura, 1925

Species of moth

Asthena sachalinensis is a moth in the family Geometridae. It is found on Sakhalin, the Kuriles and in Japan.

The wingspan is 17–21 mm.
