= Asthena octomacularia =

Scientific classification
- Kingdom: Animalia
- Phylum: Arthropoda
- Clade: Pancrustacea
- Class: Insecta
- Order: Lepidoptera
- Family: Geometridae
- Genus: Asthena
- Species: A. octomacularia

Binomial name
- Asthena octomacularia Leech, 1897

Species of moth

Asthena octomacularia is a moth in the family Geometridae first described by John Henry Leech in 1897. It is found in Korea and Japan and China.
