= Bihastina viridata =

Scientific classification
- Kingdom: Animalia
- Phylum: Arthropoda
- Clade: Pancrustacea
- Class: Insecta
- Order: Lepidoptera
- Family: Geometridae
- Genus: Bihastina
- Species: B. viridata

Binomial name
- Bihastina viridata (Warren, 1906)

Synonyms
- Hastina viridata Warren, 1906

Species of moth

Bihastina viridata is a moth in the family Geometridae. It was described by William Warren in 1906. It is found in Papua New Guinea.

The wingspan is about 22 mm (0.87 in) for males and females. The forewings are greenish white with wavy, dark green lines.
