= Asthena nymphaeata =

Scientific classification
- Kingdom: Animalia
- Phylum: Arthropoda
- Clade: Pancrustacea
- Class: Insecta
- Order: Lepidoptera
- Family: Geometridae
- Genus: Asthena
- Species: A. nymphaeata

Binomial name
- Asthena nymphaeata (Staudinger, 1897)

Synonyms
- Cidaria nymphaeata Staudinger, 1897; Acidalia ainoica Matsumura, 1927

Species of moth

Asthena nymphaeata is a moth in the family Geometridae first described by Otto Staudinger in 1897. It is found in the Russian Far East, Korea Japan and China.
