= Asthena opedogramma =

Scientific classification
- Kingdom: Animalia
- Phylum: Arthropoda
- Clade: Pancrustacea
- Class: Insecta
- Order: Lepidoptera
- Family: Geometridae
- Genus: Asthena
- Species: A. opedogramma

Binomial name
- Asthena opedogramma (L. B. Prout, 1926)

Synonyms
- Hydrelia opedogramma Prout, 1926

Species of moth

Asthena opedogramma is a moth in the family Geometridae first described by Louis Beethoven Prout in 1926. It is found in Myanmar and China.
