= Asthena amurensis =

Scientific classification
- Kingdom: Animalia
- Phylum: Arthropoda
- Clade: Pancrustacea
- Class: Insecta
- Order: Lepidoptera
- Family: Geometridae
- Genus: Asthena
- Species: A. amurensis

Binomial name
- Asthena amurensis (Staudinger, 1897)

Synonyms
- Cidaria amurensis Staudinger, 1897; Asthena hamadryas Inoue, 1976

Species of moth

Asthena amurensis is a moth in the family Geometridae. It is found in the Russian Far East, Korea and Japan.
