= Hydrelia percandidata =

Scientific classification
- Kingdom: Animalia
- Phylum: Arthropoda
- Clade: Pancrustacea
- Class: Insecta
- Order: Lepidoptera
- Family: Geometridae
- Genus: Hydrelia
- Species: H. percandidata

Binomial name
- Hydrelia percandidata (Christoph, 1893)

Synonyms
- Cidaria percandidata Christoph, 1893; Asthena percandidata; Cidaria candidissima Staudinger, 1897

Species of moth

Hydrelia percandidata is a moth in the family Geometridae. It is found in Transcaucasia and the Caucasus, as well as in Iran and Turkey.
