= Bihastina argentipuncta =

Scientific classification
- Kingdom: Animalia
- Phylum: Arthropoda
- Clade: Pancrustacea
- Class: Insecta
- Order: Lepidoptera
- Family: Geometridae
- Genus: Bihastina
- Species: B. argentipuncta

Binomial name
- Bihastina argentipuncta (Warren, 1906)

Synonyms
- Asthena argentipuncta Warren, 1906

Species of moth

Bihastina argentipuncta is a moth in the family Geometridae. It was described by William Warren in 1906. It is found in Papua New Guinea.

The wingspan is about 24 mm (0.94 in) for males and 26 mm (1.0 in) for females.
