= Bihastina aurantiaca =

Scientific classification
- Kingdom: Animalia
- Phylum: Arthropoda
- Clade: Pancrustacea
- Class: Insecta
- Order: Lepidoptera
- Family: Geometridae
- Genus: Bihastina
- Species: B. aurantiaca

Binomial name
- Bihastina aurantiaca (L. B. Prout, 1926)

Synonyms
- Asthena aurantiaca Prout, 1926

Species of moth

Bihastina aurantiaca is a moth in the family Geometridae. It was described by Louis Beethoven Prout in 1926. It is known from Irian Jaya (Western New Guinea).
