= Bihastina eurychora =

Scientific classification
- Kingdom: Animalia
- Phylum: Arthropoda
- Clade: Pancrustacea
- Class: Insecta
- Order: Lepidoptera
- Family: Geometridae
- Genus: Bihastina
- Species: B. eurychora

Binomial name
- Bihastina eurychora (Prout, 1928)

Synonyms
- Asthena eurychora Prout, 1928

Species of moth

Bihastina eurychora is a moth in the family Geometridae. It was described by Louis Beethoven Prout in 1928. It is found in Samoa.
