= Hydrelia chionata =

Scientific classification
- Kingdom: Animalia
- Phylum: Arthropoda
- Clade: Pancrustacea
- Class: Insecta
- Order: Lepidoptera
- Family: Geometridae
- Genus: Hydrelia
- Species: H. chionata

Binomial name
- Hydrelia chionata (Lederer, 1870)

Synonyms
- Cidaria chionata Lederer, 1870; Asthena chionata; Cidaria quadripunctata Biernert, 1871

Species of moth

Hydrelia chionata is a moth in the family Geometridae. It is found in Iran.
