= Pseudostegania straminearia =

Scientific classification
- Domain: Eukaryota
- Kingdom: Animalia
- Phylum: Arthropoda
- Class: Insecta
- Order: Lepidoptera
- Family: Geometridae
- Genus: Pseudostegania
- Species: P. straminearia

Binomial name
- Pseudostegania straminearia (Leech, 1897)

Synonyms
- Hydrelia straminearia Leech, 1897; Asthena straminearia

Species of moth

Pseudostegania straminearia is a moth in the family Geometridae. It is found in China (Sichuan).
