= Pseudostegania yargongaria =

Scientific classification
- Domain: Eukaryota
- Kingdom: Animalia
- Phylum: Arthropoda
- Class: Insecta
- Order: Lepidoptera
- Family: Geometridae
- Genus: Pseudostegania
- Species: P. yargongaria

Binomial name
- Pseudostegania yargongaria (Oberthür, 1916)

Synonyms
- Asthena yargongaria Oberthür, 1916

Species of moth

Pseudostegania yargongaria is a moth in the family Geometridae. It is found in China.
