= Homaloxestis alopecopa =

Scientific classification
- Kingdom: Animalia
- Phylum: Arthropoda
- Class: Insecta
- Order: Lepidoptera
- Family: Lecithoceridae
- Genus: Homaloxestis
- Species: H. alopecopa

Binomial name
- Homaloxestis alopecopa Meyrick, 1929

Species of moth

Homaloxestis alopecopa is a moth in the family Lecithoceridae. It was described by Edward Meyrick in 1929. It is found on Mindanao in the Philippines.

The wingspan of this moth is about 14 mm. The forewings are ferruginous brown with a small dark fuscous transverse spot on the end of the cell. The hindwings are grey.
