= Homaloxestis tenuipalpella =

Scientific classification
- Domain: Eukaryota
- Kingdom: Animalia
- Phylum: Arthropoda
- Class: Insecta
- Order: Lepidoptera
- Family: Lecithoceridae
- Genus: Homaloxestis
- Species: H. tenuipalpella

Binomial name
- Homaloxestis tenuipalpella (Snellen, 1903)

Synonyms
- Lecithocera tenuipalpella Snellen, 1903

Species of insect

Homaloxestis tenuipalpella is a moth in the family Lecithoceridae. It was described by Snellen in 1903. It is found on Java.

The wingspan is 11–14 mm. The forewings are brownish-grey. The hindwings are somewhat darker.
