= Homaloxestis hainanensis =

Scientific classification
- Kingdom: Animalia
- Phylum: Arthropoda
- Clade: Pancrustacea
- Class: Insecta
- Order: Lepidoptera
- Family: Lecithoceridae
- Genus: Homaloxestis
- Species: H. hainanensis

Binomial name
- Homaloxestis hainanensis C. S. Wu, 1994

Species of moth

Homaloxestis hainanensis is a moth in the family Lecithoceridae. It was described by Chun-Sheng Wu in 1994. It is found in northern Vietnam, Thailand and Hainan, China.
