= Homaloxestis endocoma =

Scientific classification
- Kingdom: Animalia
- Phylum: Arthropoda
- Class: Insecta
- Order: Lepidoptera
- Family: Lecithoceridae
- Genus: Homaloxestis
- Species: H. endocoma

Binomial name
- Homaloxestis endocoma Meyrick, 1910

Synonyms
- Homaloxestis corythota Meyrick, 1929

Species of moth

Homaloxestis endocoma is a moth in the family Lecithoceridae. It was described by Edward Meyrick in 1910. It is found in southern India.

The wingspan is about 19 mm. The forewings are rather dark glossy fuscous, on the undersurface with the anterior half clothed with light ochreous-yellowish hairs, limited by a large transverse patch of very long curled hairs beyond the middle, anteriorly light yellowish, posteriorly fuscous, above which is a longitudinal brush of dense dark fuscous hairs from beneath the costa. The hindwings are fuscous, towards the costa posteriorly with modified scales tinged with whitish ochreous, on the anterior half of the costa with a fringe of very long dense ochreous-yellow hairs projecting beneath the forewings. On the undersurface is a broad median fascia of ochreous-yellow suffusion clothed with appressed (flattened) hairs except towards the lower extremity.
