= Homaloxestis pancrocopa =

Scientific classification
- Kingdom: Animalia
- Phylum: Arthropoda
- Class: Insecta
- Order: Lepidoptera
- Family: Lecithoceridae
- Genus: Homaloxestis
- Species: H. pancrocopa

Binomial name
- Homaloxestis pancrocopa Meyrick, 1937

Species of moth

Homaloxestis pancrocopa is a moth in the family Lecithoceridae. It was described by Edward Meyrick in 1937. It is found in the former Katanga Province of the Democratic Republic of the Congo.
