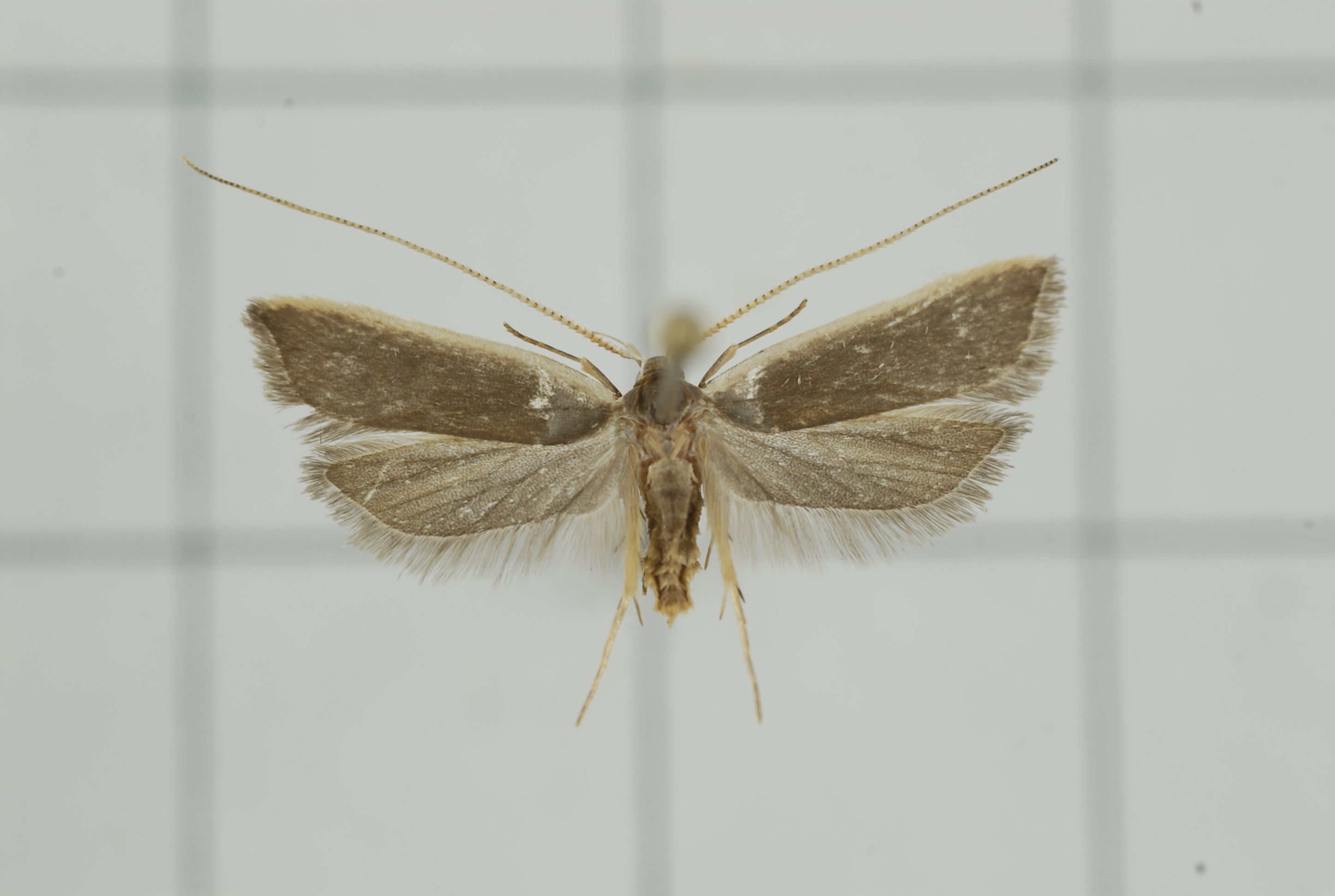

Scientific classification
- Kingdom: Animalia
- Phylum: Arthropoda
- Class: Insecta
- Order: Lepidoptera
- Family: Lecithoceridae
- Genus: Homaloxestis
- Species: H. myeloxesta

Binomial name
- Homaloxestis myeloxesta Meyrick, 1932

= Homaloxestis myeloxesta =

Species of moth

Homaloxestis myeloxesta is a moth in the family Lecithoceridae. It is found in Taiwan and Japan.
