= Homaloxestis orthochlora =

Scientific classification
- Kingdom: Animalia
- Phylum: Arthropoda
- Class: Insecta
- Order: Lepidoptera
- Family: Lecithoceridae
- Genus: Homaloxestis
- Species: H. orthochlora

Binomial name
- Homaloxestis orthochlora Meyrick, 1926

Species of moth

Homaloxestis orthochlora is a moth in the family Lecithoceridae. It was described by Edward Meyrick in 1926. It is found on Borneo.

The wingspan is about 19 mm. The forewings are dark fuscous to the termen, with a slender whitish-ochreous costal streak from the base to the apex, but with the extreme costal edge fuscous anteriorly. The hindwings are dark grey.
