= Homaloxestis xylotripta =

Scientific classification
- Kingdom: Animalia
- Phylum: Arthropoda
- Class: Insecta
- Order: Lepidoptera
- Family: Lecithoceridae
- Genus: Homaloxestis
- Species: H. xylotripta

Binomial name
- Homaloxestis xylotripta Meyrick, 1918

Species of moth

Homaloxestis xylotripta is a moth in the family Lecithoceridae. It was described by Edward Meyrick in 1918. It is found in north-western India and northern Vietnam.

The wingspan is 15–16 mm. The forewings are light fuscous and the hindwings are light greyish.
