= Homaloxestis hilaris =

Scientific classification
- Kingdom: Animalia
- Phylum: Arthropoda
- Clade: Pancrustacea
- Class: Insecta
- Order: Lepidoptera
- Family: Lecithoceridae
- Genus: Homaloxestis
- Species: H. hilaris

Binomial name
- Homaloxestis hilaris Gozmány, 1978

Species of moth

Homaloxestis hilaris is a moth in the family Lecithoceridae. It is found in Taiwan and Zhejiang, China.

The wingspan is 15 mm.
