= Homaloxestis ceroxesta =

Scientific classification
- Kingdom: Animalia
- Phylum: Arthropoda
- Class: Insecta
- Order: Lepidoptera
- Family: Lecithoceridae
- Genus: Homaloxestis
- Species: H. ceroxesta

Binomial name
- Homaloxestis ceroxesta Meyrick, 1918

Species of moth

Homaloxestis ceroxesta is a moth in the family Lecithoceridae. It was described by Edward Meyrick in 1918. It is found on Java and in southern India.

The wingspan is about 15 mm. The forewings are pale ochreous fuscous, the costa suffused with pale yellow ochreous. The hindwings are grey.
