= Homaloxestis croceata =

Scientific classification
- Kingdom: Animalia
- Phylum: Arthropoda
- Clade: Pancrustacea
- Class: Insecta
- Order: Lepidoptera
- Family: Lecithoceridae
- Genus: Homaloxestis
- Species: H. croceata

Binomial name
- Homaloxestis croceata Gozmány, 1978

Species of moth

Homaloxestis croceata is a moth in the family Lecithoceridae. It was described by László Anthony Gozmány in 1978. It is found in China (Hebei, Jiangsu) and Korea.

The wingspan is 14–15 mm.
