= Homaloxestis hemigastra =

Scientific classification
- Kingdom: Animalia
- Phylum: Arthropoda
- Class: Insecta
- Order: Lepidoptera
- Family: Lecithoceridae
- Genus: Homaloxestis
- Species: H. hemigastra

Binomial name
- Homaloxestis hemigastra Meyrick, 1931

Synonyms
- Furcalis hemigastra (Meyrick, 1931)

Species of moth

Homaloxestis hemigastra is a moth in the family Lecithoceridae. It was described by Edward Meyrick in 1931. It is found in Uganda.
