= Homaloxestis baibaraensis =

Scientific classification
- Kingdom: Animalia
- Phylum: Arthropoda
- Class: Insecta
- Order: Lepidoptera
- Family: Lecithoceridae
- Genus: Homaloxestis
- Species: H. baibaraensis

Binomial name
- Homaloxestis baibaraensis Park, 1999

Species of moth

Homaloxestis baibaraensis is a moth in the family Lecithoceridae first described by Kyu-Tek Park in 1999. It is found in Taiwan.

The wingspan is 15.5 mm.
