= Homaloxestis ochrosceles =

Scientific classification
- Kingdom: Animalia
- Phylum: Arthropoda
- Class: Insecta
- Order: Lepidoptera
- Family: Lecithoceridae
- Genus: Homaloxestis
- Species: H. ochrosceles

Binomial name
- Homaloxestis ochrosceles Meyrick, 1910

Species of moth

Homaloxestis ochrosceles is a moth in the family Lecithoceridae. It was described by Edward Meyrick in 1910. It is found in Sri Lanka.

The wingspan is about 15 mm. The forewings are fuscous and the hindwings are grey.
