= Homaloxestis saitoi =

Scientific classification
- Kingdom: Animalia
- Phylum: Arthropoda
- Clade: Pancrustacea
- Class: Insecta
- Order: Lepidoptera
- Family: Lecithoceridae
- Genus: Homaloxestis
- Species: H. saitoi

Binomial name
- Homaloxestis saitoi Park, 2004

Species of moth

Homaloxestis saitoi is a moth in the family Lecithoceridae. It was described by Kyu-Tek Park in 2004. It is found in Thailand.
