= Homaloxestis cholopis =

Scientific classification
- Kingdom: Animalia
- Phylum: Arthropoda
- Class: Insecta
- Order: Lepidoptera
- Family: Lecithoceridae
- Genus: Homaloxestis
- Species: H. cholopis

Binomial name
- Homaloxestis cholopis (Meyrick, 1906)

Synonyms
- Lecithocera cholopis Meyrick, 1906; Homaloxestis lophophora Janse, 1954; Homaloxestis surrepta Diakonoff, 1968

Species of moth

Homaloxestis cholopis is a moth in the family Lecithoceridae. It is found in Taiwan, China (Fujian, Guangdong, Hainan, Yunnan), Myanmar, Nepal, India, Java and south-western Africa.

The wingspan is 14.5–17 mm. The forewings are rather dark fuscous and the hindwings are whitish-grey, greyer posteriorly.
