= Homaloxestis striapunctata =

Scientific classification
- Kingdom: Animalia
- Phylum: Arthropoda
- Clade: Pancrustacea
- Class: Insecta
- Order: Lepidoptera
- Family: Lecithoceridae
- Genus: Homaloxestis
- Species: H. striapunctata

Binomial name
- Homaloxestis striapunctata (Wu, 1997)

Synonyms
- Frisilia striapunctata Wu, 1997

Species of moth

Homaloxestis striapunctata is a moth in the family Lecithoceridae. It was described by Chun-Sheng Wu in 1997. It is found in northern Vietnam and Hainan, China.
