= Homaloxestis grabia =

Scientific classification
- Kingdom: Animalia
- Phylum: Arthropoda
- Clade: Pancrustacea
- Class: Insecta
- Order: Lepidoptera
- Family: Lecithoceridae
- Genus: Homaloxestis
- Species: H. grabia

Binomial name
- Homaloxestis grabia C. S. Wu & Park, 1999

Species of moth

Homaloxestis grabia is a moth in the family Lecithoceridae; endemic to Sri Lanka. It was described by Chun-Sheng Wu and Kyu-Tek Park in 1999.

The wingspan is 10–12 mm.

== Etymology ==
The species name is derived from Greek grabion (meaning torch).
