= Homaloxestis perichlora =

Scientific classification
- Kingdom: Animalia
- Phylum: Arthropoda
- Class: Insecta
- Order: Lepidoptera
- Family: Lecithoceridae
- Genus: Homaloxestis
- Species: H. perichlora

Binomial name
- Homaloxestis perichlora Meyrick, 1910

Species of moth

Homaloxestis perichlora is a moth in the family Lecithoceridae. It was described by Edward Meyrick in 1910. It is found on Borneo.

The wingspan is about 14 mm. The forewings are rather dark fuscous, faintly tinged with purplish and with a rather broad whitish-yellow stripe along the costa from the base to the apex, narrowed posteriorly. The hindwings are grey.
