= Homaloxestis liochlaena =

Scientific classification
- Kingdom: Animalia
- Phylum: Arthropoda
- Class: Insecta
- Order: Lepidoptera
- Family: Lecithoceridae
- Genus: Homaloxestis
- Species: H. liochlaena

Binomial name
- Homaloxestis liochlaena Meyrick, 1931

Species of moth

Homaloxestis liochlaena is a moth in the family Lecithoceridae. It was described by Edward Meyrick in 1931. It is found in Eastern China.
