= Homaloxestis liciata =

Scientific classification
- Kingdom: Animalia
- Phylum: Arthropoda
- Class: Insecta
- Order: Lepidoptera
- Family: Lecithoceridae
- Genus: Homaloxestis
- Species: H. liciata

Binomial name
- Homaloxestis liciata Meyrick, 1922

Species of moth

Homaloxestis liciata is a moth in the family Lecithoceridae. It was described by Edward Meyrick in 1922. It is found on Java in Indonesia.

The wingspan is about 20 mm. The forewings are violet grey with the costa slenderly whitish from the base to near the apex. The hindwings are grey.
