= Homaloxestis ellipsoidea =

Scientific classification
- Kingdom: Animalia
- Phylum: Arthropoda
- Clade: Pancrustacea
- Class: Insecta
- Order: Lepidoptera
- Family: Lecithoceridae
- Genus: Homaloxestis
- Species: H. ellipsoidea

Binomial name
- Homaloxestis ellipsoidea S.-R. Liu & S.-X. Wang, 2014

Species of moth

Homaloxestis ellipsoidea is a moth in the family Lecithoceridae. It was described by Shu-Rong Liu and Shu-Xia Wang in 2014. It is found in Yunnan, China.
