= Homaloxestis quadralis =

Scientific classification
- Kingdom: Animalia
- Phylum: Arthropoda
- Class: Insecta
- Order: Lepidoptera
- Family: Lecithoceridae
- Genus: Homaloxestis
- Species: H. quadralis

Binomial name
- Homaloxestis quadralis Park & Byun, 2007

Species of moth

Homaloxestis quadralis is a moth in the family Lecithoceridae. It was described by Kyu-Tek Park and Bong-Kyu Byun in 2007. It is found in Palawan in the Philippines.
