= Homaloxestis eccentropa =

Scientific classification
- Kingdom: Animalia
- Phylum: Arthropoda
- Class: Insecta
- Order: Lepidoptera
- Family: Lecithoceridae
- Genus: Homaloxestis
- Species: H. eccentropa

Binomial name
- Homaloxestis eccentropa Meyrick, 1934

Species of moth

Homaloxestis eccentropa is a moth in the family Lecithoceridae. It was described by Edward Meyrick in 1934. It is found in southern China.
