= Homaloxestis cicatrix =

Scientific classification
- Kingdom: Animalia
- Phylum: Arthropoda
- Clade: Pancrustacea
- Class: Insecta
- Order: Lepidoptera
- Family: Lecithoceridae
- Genus: Homaloxestis
- Species: H. cicatrix

Binomial name
- Homaloxestis cicatrix Gozmány, 1973

Species of moth

Homaloxestis cicatrix is a moth in the family Lecithoceridae. It was described by László Anthony Gozmány in 1973. It is found in Nepal, northern Vietnam and China (Jiangxi, Hainan).
