= Homaloxestis vinhphuensis =

Scientific classification
- Kingdom: Animalia
- Phylum: Arthropoda
- Clade: Pancrustacea
- Class: Insecta
- Order: Lepidoptera
- Family: Lecithoceridae
- Genus: Homaloxestis
- Species: H. vinhphuensis

Binomial name
- Homaloxestis vinhphuensis Park, 2007

Species of moth

Homaloxestis vinhphuensis is a moth in the family Lecithoceridae. It was described by Kyu-Tek Park in 2007. It is found in northern Vietnam.
