= Homaloxestis plocamandra =

Scientific classification
- Kingdom: Animalia
- Phylum: Arthropoda
- Class: Insecta
- Order: Lepidoptera
- Family: Lecithoceridae
- Genus: Homaloxestis
- Species: H. plocamandra

Binomial name
- Homaloxestis plocamandra (Meyrick, 1907)

Synonyms
- Lecithocera plocamandra Meyrick, 1907

Species of moth

Homaloxestis plocamandra is a moth in the family Lecithoceridae. It was described by Edward Meyrick in 1907. It is found in Nepal, India (Assam, Sikkim), Bhutan, northern Vietnam, Thailand and the Philippines (Luzon).

The wingspan is 14–16 mm. The forewings are light fuscous and the hindwings are light fuscous, somewhat lighter towards the base. Males have a large expansible tuft of very long pale ochreous-yellowish hairs from the base of the dorsum on the underside of the hindwings.
