= Homaloxestis lacerta =

Scientific classification
- Kingdom: Animalia
- Phylum: Arthropoda
- Clade: Pancrustacea
- Class: Insecta
- Order: Lepidoptera
- Family: Lecithoceridae
- Genus: Homaloxestis
- Species: H. lacerta

Binomial name
- Homaloxestis lacerta C. S. Wu & Park, 1999

Species of moth

Homaloxestis lacerta is a moth in the family Lecithoceridae. It was described by Chun-Sheng Wu and Kyu-Tek Park in 1999. It is found in Sri Lanka.

The wingspan is about 10 mm.

== Etymology ==
The species name is derived from Latin lacertus (meaning lizard).
