= Homaloxestis horochlora =

Scientific classification
- Kingdom: Animalia
- Phylum: Arthropoda
- Class: Insecta
- Order: Lepidoptera
- Family: Lecithoceridae
- Genus: Homaloxestis
- Species: H. horochlora

Binomial name
- Homaloxestis horochlora Meyrick, 1929

Species of moth

Homaloxestis horochlora is a moth in the family Lecithoceridae. It was described by Edward Meyrick in 1929. It is found in southern India.

The wingspan is about 15 mm.
