= Homaloxestis queribunda =

Scientific classification
- Kingdom: Animalia
- Phylum: Arthropoda
- Class: Insecta
- Order: Lepidoptera
- Family: Lecithoceridae
- Genus: Homaloxestis
- Species: H. queribunda

Binomial name
- Homaloxestis queribunda Meyrick, 1922

Species of moth

Homaloxestis queribunda is a moth in the family Lecithoceridae. It was described by Edward Meyrick in 1922. It is found on Java in Indonesia.

The wingspan is 16–18 mm. The forewings are light pinkish ochreous grey with the costa obscurely suffused with yellow whitish. The hindwings are light grey.
