= Homaloxestis antibathra =

Scientific classification
- Domain: Eukaryota
- Kingdom: Animalia
- Phylum: Arthropoda
- Class: Insecta
- Order: Lepidoptera
- Family: Lecithoceridae
- Genus: Homaloxestis
- Species: H. antibathra

Binomial name
- Homaloxestis antibathra Meyrick, 1916

Species of moth

Homaloxestis antibathra is a moth in the family Lecithoceridae. It was described by Edward Meyrick in 1916. It is found in southern India.

The wingspan is about 14 mm. The forewings are dark fuscous and the hindwings are grey.
