= Homaloxestis xanthocharis =

Scientific classification
- Kingdom: Animalia
- Phylum: Arthropoda
- Class: Insecta
- Order: Lepidoptera
- Family: Lecithoceridae
- Genus: Homaloxestis
- Species: H. xanthocharis

Binomial name
- Homaloxestis xanthocharis Meyrick, 1929

Species of moth

Homaloxestis xanthocharis is a moth in the family Lecithoceridae. It was described by Edward Meyrick in 1929. It is found in the Andaman Islands of India.

The wingspan is about 14 mm for males and 16 mm for females.
