= Homaloxestis cribanota =

Scientific classification
- Kingdom: Animalia
- Phylum: Arthropoda
- Class: Insecta
- Order: Lepidoptera
- Family: Lecithoceridae
- Genus: Homaloxestis
- Species: H. cribanota

Binomial name
- Homaloxestis cribanota Meyrick, 1910

Species of moth

Homaloxestis cribanota is a moth in the family Lecithoceridae. It was described by Edward Meyrick in 1910. It is found in Assam, India.

The wingspan is 13–16 mm. The forewings are glossy fuscous and the hindwings are grey.
