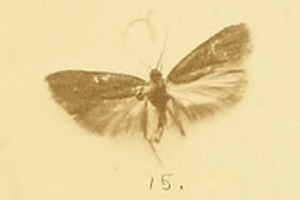

Scientific classification
- Domain: Eukaryota
- Kingdom: Animalia
- Phylum: Arthropoda
- Class: Insecta
- Order: Lepidoptera
- Family: Lecithoceridae
- Genus: Homaloxestis
- Species: H. briantiella

Binomial name
- Homaloxestis briantiella (Turati, 1879)

Synonyms
- Lecithocera briantiella Turati, 1879

= Homaloxestis briantiella =

Species of moth

Homaloxestis briantiella is a moth in the family Lecithoceridae. It was described by Turati in 1879. It is found in Morocco, Portugal, Spain, Gibraltar, France, Germany, Switzerland, Austria, Italy, Slovakia, Albania, Hungary, Romania and the Republic of Macedonia, as well as on Corsica, Sardinia and Sicily.

The wingspan is 18–20 mm. The forewings are dark fuscous and the hindwings are grey.

The larvae feed on vegetable matter.
