= Homaloxestis luzonensis =

Scientific classification
- Kingdom: Animalia
- Phylum: Arthropoda
- Class: Insecta
- Order: Lepidoptera
- Family: Lecithoceridae
- Genus: Homaloxestis
- Species: H. luzonensis

Binomial name
- Homaloxestis luzonensis Park & B. K. Byun, 2007

Species of moth

Homaloxestis luzonensis is a moth in the family Lecithoceridae. It was described by Kyu-Tek Park and Bong-Kyu Byun in 2007. It is found on Luzon in the Philippines.

The wingspan is 17–18 mm.
