= Homaloxestis aganacma =

Scientific classification
- Kingdom: Animalia
- Phylum: Arthropoda
- Clade: Pancrustacea
- Class: Insecta
- Order: Lepidoptera
- Family: Lecithoceridae
- Genus: Homaloxestis
- Species: H. aganacma

Binomial name
- Homaloxestis aganacma Diakonoff, 1968

Species of moth

Homaloxestis aganacma is a moth in the family Lecithoceridae. It was described by Alexey Diakonoff in 1968. It is found on Luzon in the Philippines.

The wingspan is about 13 mm. The forewings are light tawny greyish, the base of costal edge with a narrow dark fuscous line, followed by a yellow streak, gradually dilated posteriorly and running along the course of vein 7 and a black marginal line around the apex between the ends of veins 7 and 8. The hindwings are rather deep brownish fuscous bronze.
