= Homaloxestis turbinata =

Scientific classification
- Kingdom: Animalia
- Phylum: Arthropoda
- Class: Insecta
- Order: Lepidoptera
- Family: Lecithoceridae
- Genus: Homaloxestis
- Species: H. turbinata

Binomial name
- Homaloxestis turbinata Meyrick, 1910

Species of moth

Homaloxestis turbinata is a moth in the family Lecithoceridae. It was described by Edward Meyrick in 1910. It is found in Assam, India.

The wingspan is about 13 mm. The forewings are ochreous yellow, with some scattered dark fuscous scales and a small dark fuscous spot on the base of the costa. The plical and first discal stigmata are represented by small nearly adjacent dark fuscous spots, the former slightly anterior. There is a triangular dark fuscous blotch on the costa at about two-thirds, its apex is produced and reaching three-fourths of the way across the wing. There is also a cloudy dark fuscous streak along the upper three-fourths of the termen. The hindwings are pale ochreous yellowish with a dark grey streak along the termen, on the lower half more broadly suffused with lighter grey, and connected with an oblique dark grey linear mark on the transverse vein.
