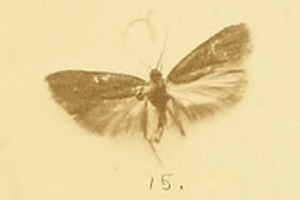
- Homaloxestis briantiella

Scientific classification
- Kingdom: Animalia
- Phylum: Arthropoda
- Class: Insecta
- Order: Lepidoptera
- Family: Lecithoceridae
- Subfamily: Lecithocerinae
- Genus: Homaloxestis; Meyrick, 1910

= Homaloxestis =

Genus of moths

Homaloxestis is a genus of moths in the family Lecithoceridae. The genus was erected by Edward Meyrick in 1910.

== Species ==
- Homaloxestis aciformis Liu & Wang, 2014
- Homaloxestis aganacma Diakonoff, 1968
- Homaloxestis alopecopa Meyrick, 1929
- Homaloxestis antibathra Meyrick, 1916
- Homaloxestis australis Park, 2004
- Homaloxestis baibaraensis Park, 1999
- Homaloxestis briantiella (Turati, 1879)
- Homaloxestis ceroxesta Meyrick, 1918
- Homaloxestis cholopis (Meyrick, 1906)
- Homaloxestis cicatrix Gozmány, 1973
- Homaloxestis cribanota Meyrick, 1910
- Homaloxestis croceata Gozmány, 1978
- Homaloxestis eccentropa Meyrick, 1934
- Homaloxestis ellipsoidea Liu & Wang, 2014
- Homaloxestis endocoma Meyrick, 1910
- Homaloxestis furcula Park, 2004
- Homaloxestis grabia C. S. Wu & Park, 1999
- Homaloxestis hades Gozmány, 1978
- Homaloxestis hainanensis C. S. Wu, 1994
- Homaloxestis hemigastra Meyrick, 1931
- Homaloxestis hesperis Gozmány, 1978
- Homaloxestis hilaris Gozmány, 1978
- Homaloxestis horochlora Meyrick, 1929
- Homaloxestis horridens Gozmány, 1978
- Homaloxestis lacerta C. S. Wu & Park, 1999
- Homaloxestis liciata Meyrick, 1922
- Homaloxestis liochlaena Meyrick, 1931
- Homaloxestis lochitis Meyrick, 1918
- Homaloxestis luzonensis Park & Byun, 2007
- Homaloxestis mucroraphis Gozmány, 1978
- Homaloxestis multidentalis Park, 2004
- Homaloxestis myeloxesta Meyrick, 1932
- Homaloxestis ochrosceles Meyrick, 1910
- Homaloxestis orthochlora Meyrick, 1926
- Homaloxestis pancrocopa Meyrick, 1937
- Homaloxestis perichlora Meyrick, 1910
- Homaloxestis plocamandra (Meyrick, 1907)
- Homaloxestis pumilis Park, 2004
- Homaloxestis quadralis Park & Byun, 2007
- Homaloxestis queribunda Meyrick, 1922
- Homaloxestis saitoi Park, 2004
- Homaloxestis striapunctata (Wu, 1997)
- Homaloxestis subpallida Meyrick, 1931
- Homaloxestis tenuipalpella (Snellen, 1903)
- Homaloxestis turbinata Meyrick, 1910
- Homaloxestis vinhphuensis Park, 2007
- Homaloxestis xanthocharis Meyrick, 1929
- Homaloxestis xylotripta Meyrick, 1918

== Former species ==
- Homaloxestis lophophora Janse, 1954
