= Homaloxestis lochitis =

Scientific classification
- Kingdom: Animalia
- Phylum: Arthropoda
- Class: Insecta
- Order: Lepidoptera
- Family: Lecithoceridae
- Genus: Homaloxestis
- Species: H. lochitis

Binomial name
- Homaloxestis lochitis Meyrick, 1918

Species of moth

Homaloxestis lochitis is a moth in the family Lecithoceridae. It was described by Edward Meyrick in 1918. It is found in southern India.

The wingspan is about 9 mm. The forewings are pale whitish ochreous with a black dot on the base of the costa. The discal stigmata are moderate and black, with a black dot on the dorsum beneath the second and small black marginal dots or marks around the posterior part of the costa and termen. The hindwings are light grey.
