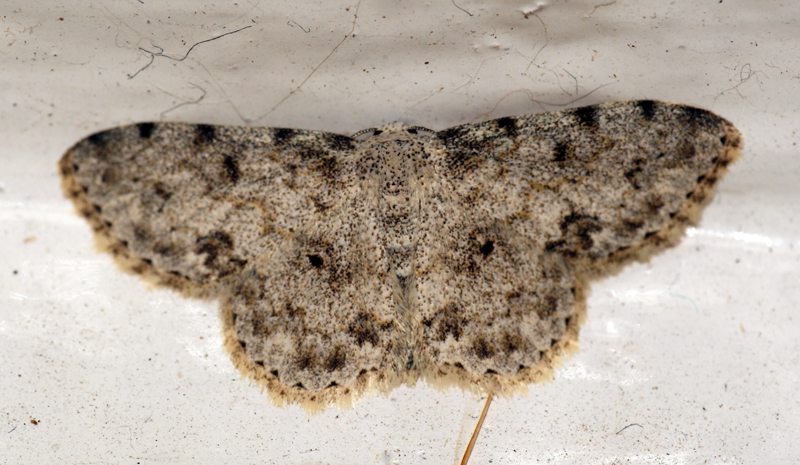

Scientific classification
- Domain: Eukaryota
- Kingdom: Animalia
- Phylum: Arthropoda
- Class: Insecta
- Order: Lepidoptera
- Family: Geometridae
- Genus: Scopula
- Species: S. fibulata

Binomial name
- Scopula fibulata (Guenée, [1858])

Synonyms
- Acidalia fibulata Guenee, 1858

= Scopula fibulata =

Species of geometer moth in subfamily Sterrhinae

Scopula fibulata is a moth of the family Geometridae first described by Achille Guenée in 1858. It is found in Kenya, Sri Lanka and China.

== Description ==
Its wingspan is about 26–28 millimetres (1.0–1.1 in). The species is grey thickly irrorated (sprinkled) with fuscous. Frons black. Forewings with dentate antemedial, medial, and postmedial dark lines with olive edges, the medial line excurved round a black olive-edged cell speck, and the postmedial with a larger dentition at vein 6. A crenulate pale of white submarginal line found expanding at middle and above inner margin into patches, which may be white and prominent or obscure. Hindwings with black cell speck. There is a waved medial line. A dentate postmedial line. A pale crenulate submarginal line, sometimes expanding into pale patches above middle and above inner margin.
