= Asuridoides =

Scientific classification
- Domain: Eukaryota
- Kingdom: Animalia
- Phylum: Arthropoda
- Class: Insecta
- Order: Lepidoptera
- Superfamily: Noctuoidea
- Family: Erebidae
- Subfamily: Arctiinae
- Tribe: Lithosiini
- Genus: Asuridoides; Daniel, 1951

Genus of moths

Asuridoides is a genus of moths in the subfamily Arctiinae. The genus was erected by Franz Daniel in 1951.

== Species ==
- Asuridoides atuntseica Daniel, 1951
- Asuridoides osthelderi Daniel, 1951
