= Asuridoides atuntseica =

Scientific classification
- Domain: Eukaryota
- Kingdom: Animalia
- Phylum: Arthropoda
- Class: Insecta
- Order: Lepidoptera
- Superfamily: Noctuoidea
- Family: Erebidae
- Subfamily: Arctiinae
- Genus: Asuridoides
- Species: A. atuntseica

Binomial name
- Asuridoides atuntseica Daniel, 1951

Species of moth

Asuridoides atuntseica is a moth of the subfamily Arctiinae. It was described by Franz Daniel in 1951. It is found in Yunnan, China.
