= Asuridoides osthelderi =

Scientific classification
- Domain: Eukaryota
- Kingdom: Animalia
- Phylum: Arthropoda
- Class: Insecta
- Order: Lepidoptera
- Superfamily: Noctuoidea
- Family: Erebidae
- Subfamily: Arctiinae
- Genus: Asuridoides
- Species: A. osthelderi

Binomial name
- Asuridoides osthelderi Daniel, 1951

Species of moth

Asuridoides osthelderi is a moth of the subfamily Arctiinae. It was described by Franz Daniel in 1951. It is found in China.
