= Aurorobotys aurorina =

Scientific classification
- Domain: Eukaryota
- Kingdom: Animalia
- Phylum: Arthropoda
- Class: Insecta
- Order: Lepidoptera
- Family: Crambidae
- Genus: Aurorobotys
- Species: A. aurorina

Binomial name
- Aurorobotys aurorina (Butler, 1878)

Synonyms
- Ebulea aurorina Butler, 1878

Species of moth

Aurorobotys aurorina is a moth in the family Crambidae. It was described by Arthur Gardiner Butler in 1878. It is found in Japan and eastern China.
