= Aurorobotys crassispinalis =

Scientific classification
- Domain: Eukaryota
- Kingdom: Animalia
- Phylum: Arthropoda
- Class: Insecta
- Order: Lepidoptera
- Family: Crambidae
- Genus: Aurorobotys
- Species: A. crassispinalis

Binomial name
- Aurorobotys crassispinalis Munroe & Mutuura, 1971

Species of moth

Aurorobotys crassispinalis is a moth in the family Crambidae. It was described by Eugene G. Munroe and Akira Mutuura in 1971. It is found in Zhejiang, China.
