= Aurorobotys =

Scientific classification
- Domain: Eukaryota
- Kingdom: Animalia
- Phylum: Arthropoda
- Class: Insecta
- Order: Lepidoptera
- Family: Crambidae
- Subfamily: Pyraustinae
- Genus: Aurorobotys; Munroe & Mutuura, 1971

Genus of moths

Aurorobotys is a genus of moths of the family Crambidae.

== Species ==
- Aurorobotys aurorina (Butler, 1878)
- Aurorobotys crassispinalis Munroe & Mutuura, 1971
