= Scopula emma =

Scientific classification
- Kingdom: Animalia
- Phylum: Arthropoda
- Clade: Pancrustacea
- Class: Insecta
- Order: Lepidoptera
- Family: Geometridae
- Genus: Scopula
- Species: S. emma

Binomial name
- Scopula emma (Prout, 1913)

Synonyms
- Acidalia emma Prout, 1913; Scopula memma; Idaea jordani West, 1930

Species of geometer moth in subfamily Sterrhinae

Scopula emma is a moth of the family Geometridae. It was described by Prout in 1913. It is found in China and Taiwan.

== Subspecies ==
- Scopula emma emma
- Scopula emma jordani (West, 1930) (Taiwan)
