= Demopsestis mahendrai =

Scientific classification
- Kingdom: Animalia
- Phylum: Arthropoda
- Clade: Pancrustacea
- Class: Insecta
- Order: Lepidoptera
- Family: Drepanidae
- Genus: Demopsestis
- Species: D. mahendrai

Binomial name
- Demopsestis mahendrai Yoshimoto, 1993

Synonyms
- Demopsestis formosana mahendrai Yoshimoto, 1993

Species of false owlet moth

Demopsestis mahendrai is a moth in the family Drepanidae. It was originally described as a subspecies of Demopsestis formosana by Hiroshi Yoshimoto in 1993. It is found in Nepal.

The wingspan is 32–36 mm (1.3–1.4 in).
