= Nothoploca nigripunctata =

Scientific classification
- Kingdom: Animalia
- Phylum: Arthropoda
- Clade: Pancrustacea
- Class: Insecta
- Order: Lepidoptera
- Family: Drepanidae
- Genus: Nothoploca
- Species: N. nigripunctata

Binomial name
- Nothoploca nigripunctata (Warren, 1915)

Synonyms
- Polyploca nigripunctata Warren, 1915

Species of false owlet moth

Nothoploca nigripunctata is a moth in the family Drepanidae, or alternatively, the family Thyatiridae. It is found in India, Nepal, Bhutan, Vietnam, Korea, China and the Russian Far East.

== Description ==
The wingspan is 29–33 mm (1.1–1.3 in). The forewings are bluish white speckled with pale grey, the inner and outer bands and the terminal area tinged with brownish. The inner line is black, waved and runs from two-fifths of the costa to near the middle of the inner margin. It is preceded by three thick waved dark lines filled in with brown and there is a dark spot near the base of the submedian fold, followed by a black pointed dash. The basal area is limited by a curved dark line and the outer line is black, double, vertical at the costa, then excurved to vein 2 and again to vein 1, approaching the inner line on the inner margin. There is a pale and dark grey dentate line beyond and the subterminal line is white, defined by the dark terminal area beyond, and an oblique black streak from the apex. There is also a black terminal festoon. The hindwings are dull fuscous.

== Subspecies ==
There are three subspecies:

- Nothoploca nigripunctata nigripunctata (India: Sikkim)
- Nothoploca nigripunctata fansipana Laszlo, G.Ronkay, L.Ronkay & Witt, 2007 (Vietnam, China: Gansu, Sichuan)
- Nothoploca nigripunctata zolotarenkoi Dubatolov, 1987 (Russian Far East, Korea, China: Shaanxi, Yunnan)
