= Gaurena gemella =

Scientific classification
- Domain: Eukaryota
- Kingdom: Animalia
- Phylum: Arthropoda
- Class: Insecta
- Order: Lepidoptera
- Family: Drepanidae
- Genus: Gaurena
- Species: G. gemella

Binomial name
- Gaurena gemella Leech, 1900

Species of false owlet moth

Gaurena gemella is a moth in the family Drepanidae. It is found in China (Henan, Shaanxi, Gansu, Hubei, Hunan, Sichuan, Yunnan, Tibet) and Nepal.

Adults are similar to Gaurena florescens, but the colour of the forewings is chocolate brown and the markings are white and the spots in the cell are round and of nearly equal size. The hindwings are fuscous-grey.
