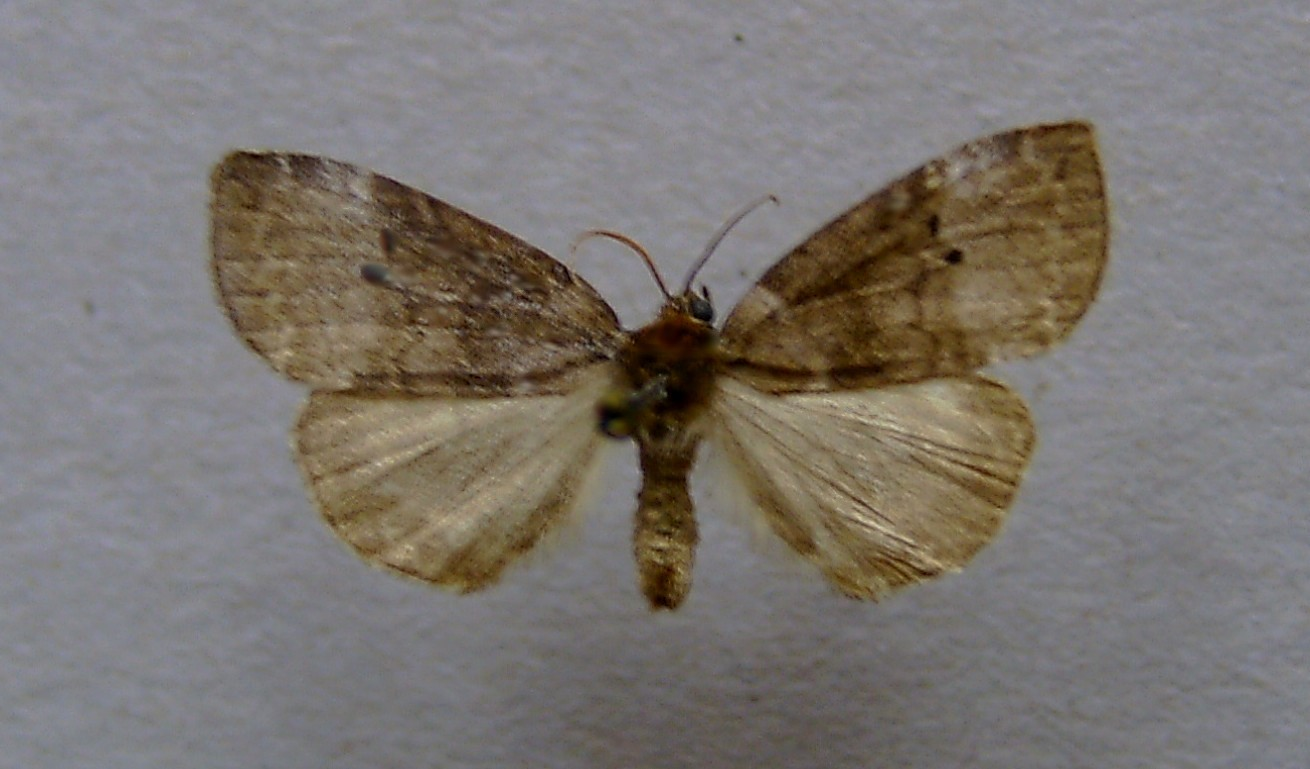

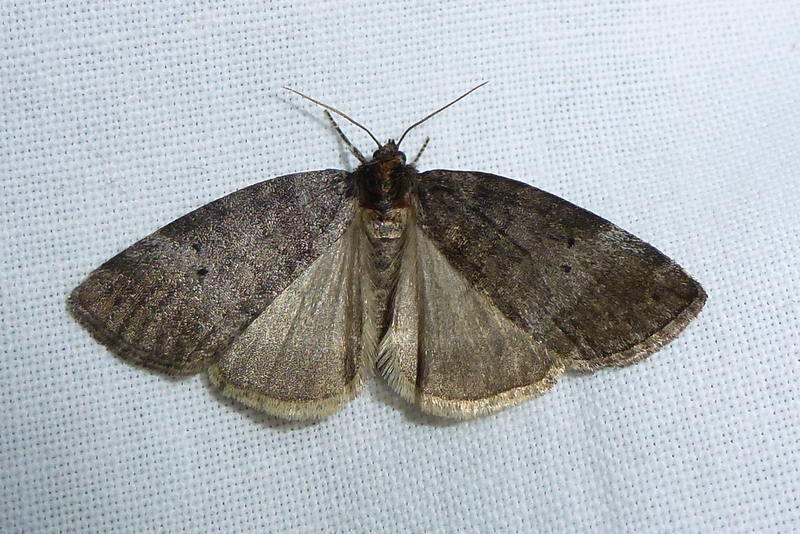

Scientific classification
- Domain: Eukaryota
- Kingdom: Animalia
- Phylum: Arthropoda
- Class: Insecta
- Order: Lepidoptera
- Family: Drepanidae
- Subfamily: Thyatirinae
- Genus: Ochropacha; Wallengren, 1871
- Species: O. duplaris

Binomial name
- Ochropacha duplaris (Linnaeus, 1761)

Synonyms
- Phalaena duplaris Linnaeus, 1761; Noctua ruficollis Brahm, 1791; Noctua bicolor Esper, 1791; Noctua bipuncta Borkhausen, 1792; Bombyx binotata Fabricius, 1793; Noctua undosa Hübner, 1804; Palimpsestis duplaris subalpina Hartig, 1938; Palimpsestis dupalris kamschadalis Sheljuzhko, 1926; Palimpsestis duplaris kamtschadalis Sheljuzhko, 1926

= Ochropacha =

Ochropacha duplaris

Monotypic moth genus in family Drepanidae

Ochropacha is a monotypic moth genus in the family Drepanidae. The genus was first described by Hans Daniel Johan Wallengren in 1871. Its single species, Ochropacha duplaris, the common lutestring, was first described by Carl Linnaeus in 1761. It is found in China (Jilin), Russia, Japan, the Korean Peninsula and from Central Asia to Europe.

The wingspan is 27–32 mm. It is similar to Tetheella fluctuosa but the forewings with the whitish lines usually less distinct, the central band usually dark-striated towards edges, two black discal dots transversely placed, no praesubterminal dash and a dark fuscous oblique apical dash. The larva is pale dull greenish, deeper dorsally; dorsal line darker; subdorsal broad, dull olive-green; lateral line, yellowish; dots black; head reddish.

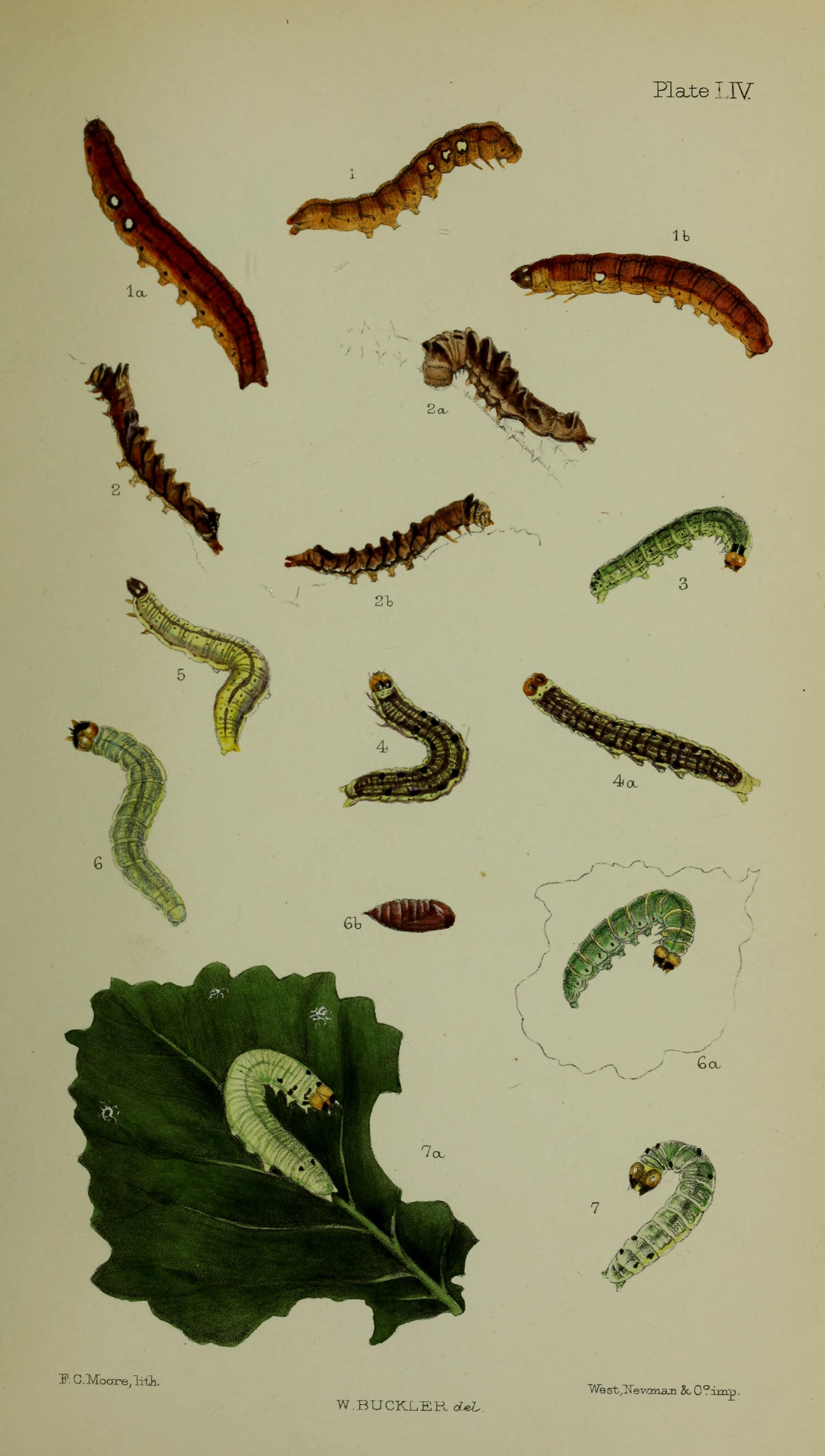
Fig 3 larvae after final moult

The moth flies from June to August depending on the location.

The larvae feed on birch.
