= Kurama =

Kurama may refer to:

== Japan ==
- Mount Kurama, a mountain in Japan frequently referenced in martial arts
- Kurama-dera, a temple
- Japanese armored cruiser Kurama, an Ibuki class armored cruiser (later battlecruiser) named after Mount Kurama
- JDS Kurama (DDH-144), a Shirane-class destroyer
- Kurama Tatsuya (1952–1995), sumo wrestler

=== Fictional characters ===
- Kurama (Naruto), a character in Naruto media
  - Kurama clan members, Naruto anime only arc (which is a female creature shaped like a fox with 9 tails)
- Kurama (Urusei Yatsura), a character in Urusei Yatsura media
- Kurama (YuYu Hakusho), a character in YuYu Hakusho media
- Kurama, a character in Elfen Lied media

== Other uses ==
- Kurama Range, mountains near Angren, Uzbekistan
- Kurama (moth), a genus of moths of the family Drepanidae
- Kurama language, a Niger-Congo language

== See also ==
- Kurrama people, an Indigenous Australian people
- Kurrama language, an Australian Aboriginal language
