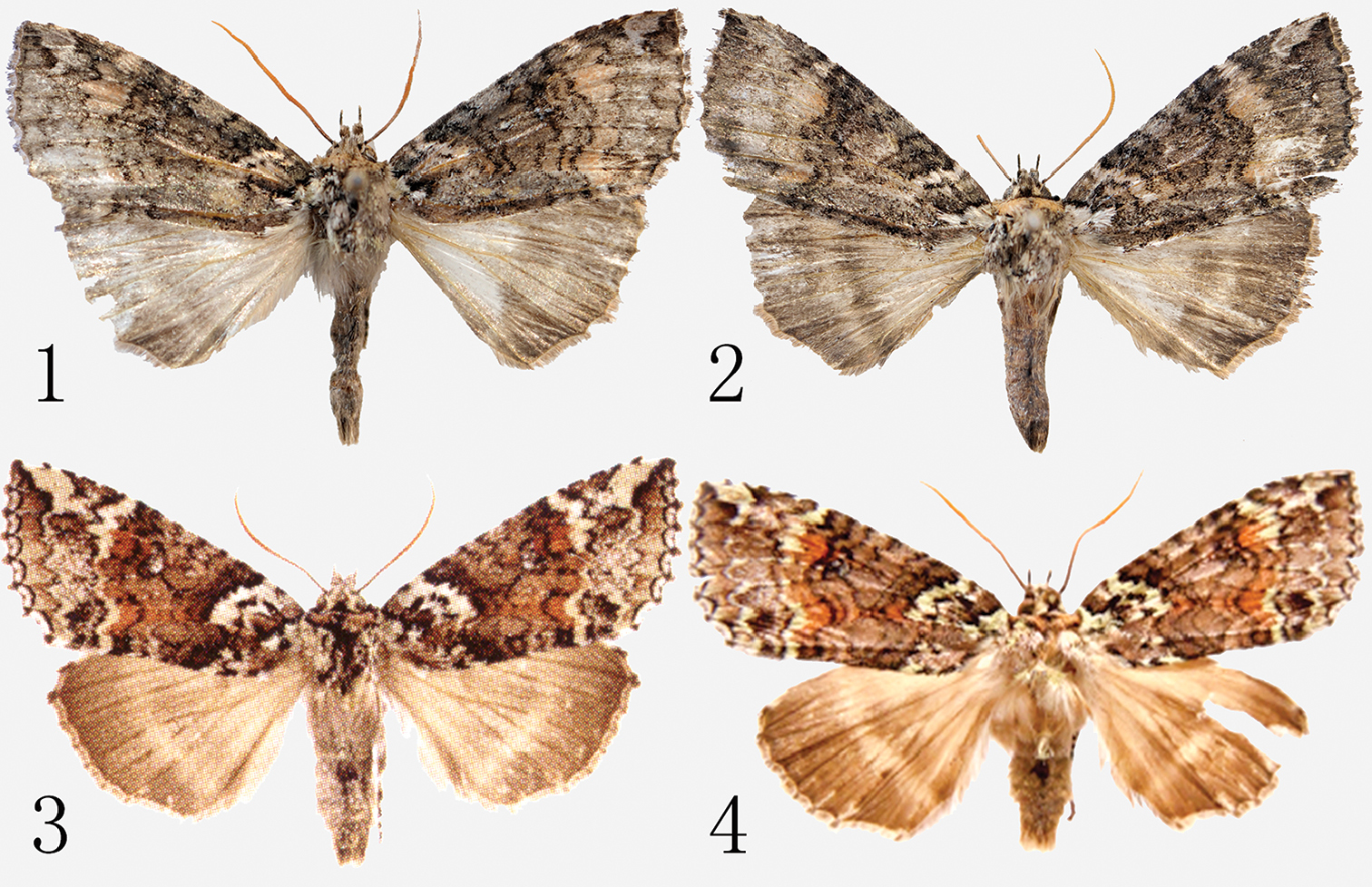
- Hiroshia albinigra (3)

Scientific classification
- Kingdom: Animalia
- Phylum: Arthropoda
- Clade: Pancrustacea
- Class: Insecta
- Order: Lepidoptera
- Family: Drepanidae
- Genus: Hiroshia
- Species: H. albinigra

Binomial name
- Hiroshia albinigra Laszlo, G. Ronkay & L. Ronkay, 2001

= Hiroshia albinigra =

Species of false owlet moth

Hiroshia albinigra is a moth in the subfamily Thyatirinae within the family Drepanidae, alternatively treated as the family Thyatiridae. It is found in Yunnan in China and in northern Vietnam, where it has been recorded from the Fansipan mountains.

The wingspan is 46–51 mm (1.8–2.0 in).
