= Gaurena aurofasciata =

Scientific classification
- Kingdom: Animalia
- Phylum: Arthropoda
- Class: Insecta
- Order: Lepidoptera
- Family: Drepanidae
- Genus: Gaurena
- Species: G. aurofasciata

Binomial name
- Gaurena aurofasciata Hampson, 1892

Synonyms
- Gaurena aurofasciata bryki Werny, 1966

Species of false owlet moth

Gaurena aurofasciata is a moth in the family Drepanidae. It is found in Myanmar, Sikkim in India and Yunnan in China.

The wingspan is about 40 mm. Adults are similar to Gaurena florens, but the head and thorax are olive, the subbasal band of the forewings is broader, there is no white spot at the middle of the cell and the spot at the end of the cell is oblong and golden. There is also a complete postmedial band between the patches on the costa and outer angle and the submarginal marginal lunules are absent, except for two above the outer angle.
