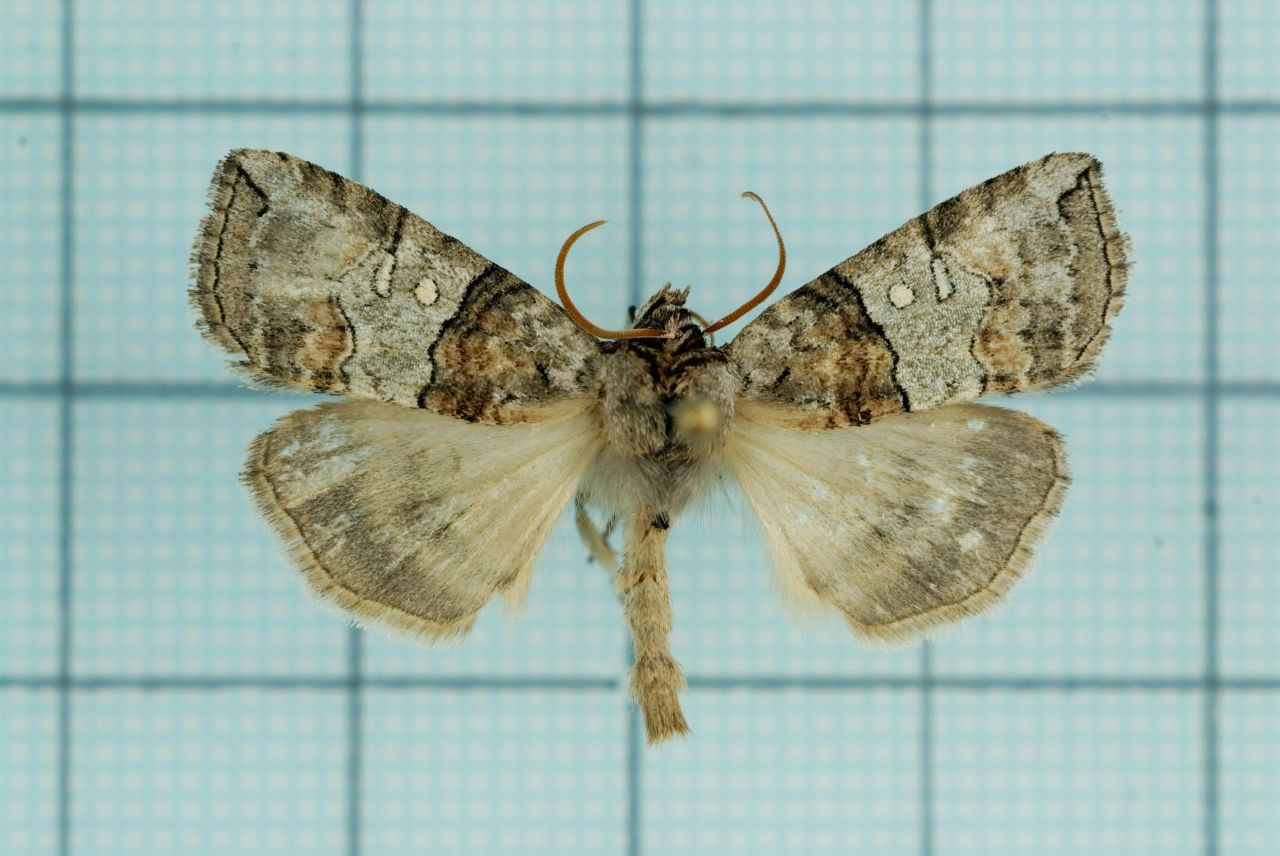

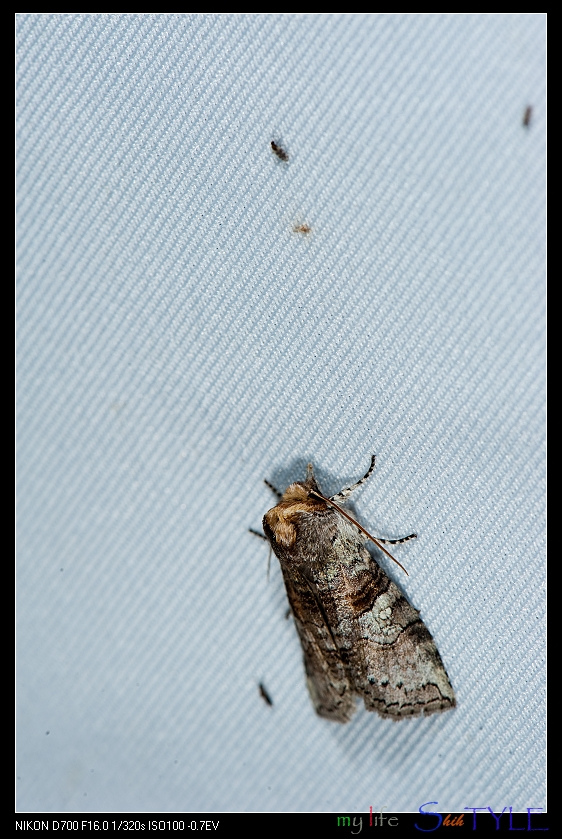

Scientific classification
- Kingdom: Animalia
- Phylum: Arthropoda
- Clade: Pancrustacea
- Class: Insecta
- Order: Lepidoptera
- Family: Drepanidae
- Genus: Nothoploca
- Species: N. endoi

Binomial name
- Nothoploca endoi Yoshimoto, 1983

= Nothoploca endoi =

Species of false owlet moth

Nothoploca endoi is a moth of the family Thyatiridae, or alternatively, the family Drepanidae. It is endemic to Taiwan.

The wingspan is 26–31 mm (1.0–1.2 in). It is probably univoltine, with adults flying in late autumn in the central and southern mountains of Taiwan.
