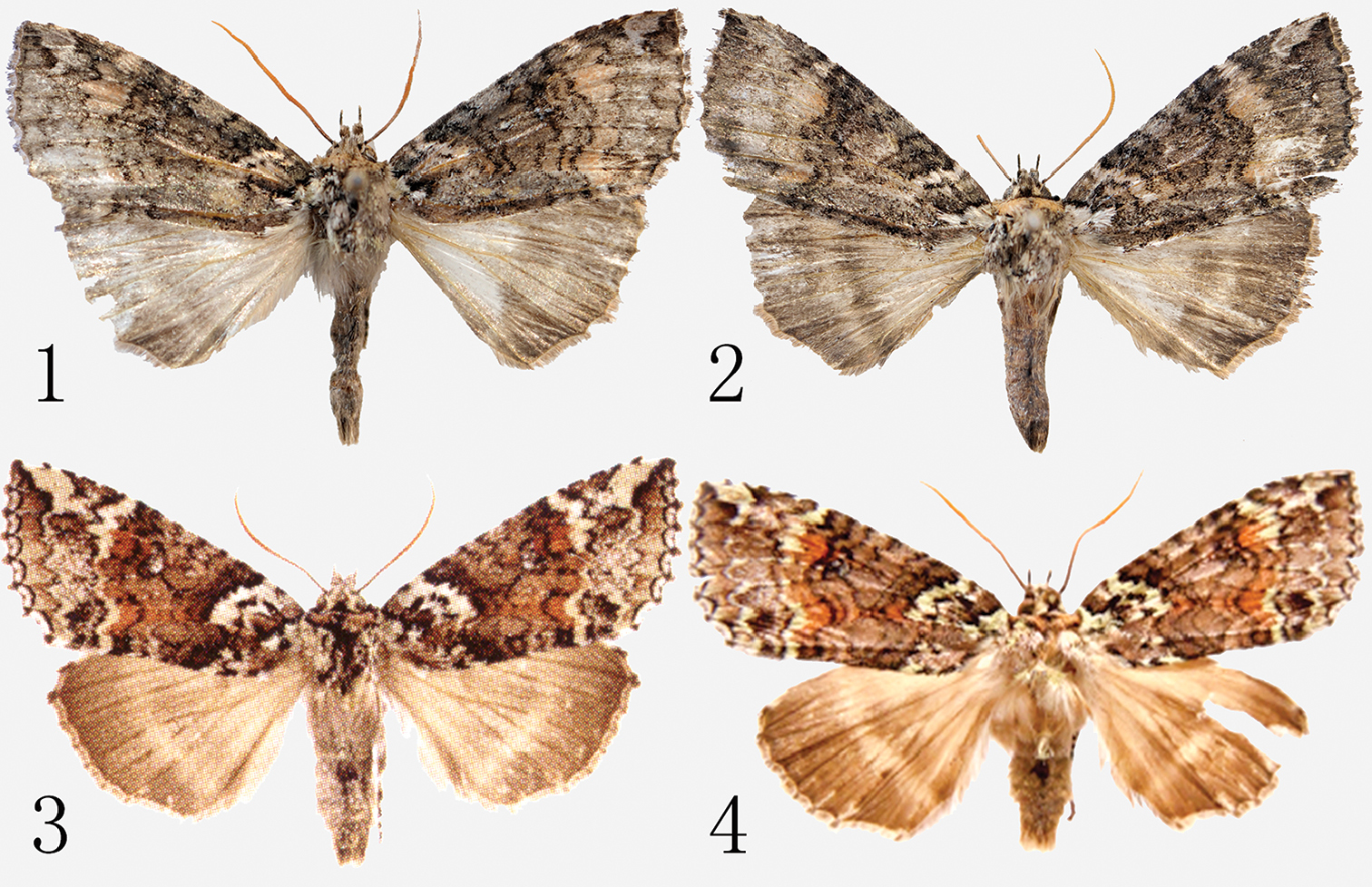
- Hiroshia nanlingana (4)

Scientific classification
- Kingdom: Animalia
- Phylum: Arthropoda
- Clade: Pancrustacea
- Class: Insecta
- Order: Lepidoptera
- Family: Drepanidae
- Genus: Hiroshia
- Species: H. nanlingana

Binomial name
- Hiroshia nanlingana H.L. Zhuang, M. Owada & M. Wang, 2014

= Hiroshia nanlingana =

Species of false owlet moth

Hiroshia nanlingana is a moth in the family Thyatiridae. It is found in southern China in Jiangxi and Guangdong.

The wingspan is 48–51 mm (1.9–2.0 in).

== Etymology ==
The species name is derived from one of the type localities.
