= Shinploca =

Scientific classification
- Domain: Eukaryota
- Kingdom: Animalia
- Phylum: Arthropoda
- Class: Insecta
- Order: Lepidoptera
- Family: Drepanidae
- Subfamily: Thyatirinae
- Genus: Shinploca; Kim, 1995
- Species: S. shini

Binomial name
- Shinploca shini Kim, 1995

Monotypic moth genus in family Drepanidae

Shinploca is a monotypic moth genus in the family Drepanidae. Its only species, Shinploca shini, is found in the Chinese provinces of Jilin and Shaanxi, south-eastern Russia and the Korean Peninsula. Both the genus and species were described by Sung-Soo Kim in 1995.
