= Polydactylos =

Scientific classification
- Domain: Eukaryota
- Kingdom: Animalia
- Phylum: Arthropoda
- Class: Insecta
- Order: Lepidoptera
- Family: Drepanidae
- Subfamily: Thyatirinae
- Genus: Polydactylos; Mell, 1942
- Species: P. aprilinus

Binomial name
- Polydactylos aprilinus Mell, 1942

Monotypic moth genus in family Drepanidae

Polydactylos is a monotypic moth genus in the family Drepanidae erected by Rudolf Mell in 1942. Its only species, Polydactylos aprilinus, was described in the same paper. It is found in the Chinese provinces of Zhejiang, Guangdong and Hainan and in Vietnam.
