= Gaurena delattini =

Scientific classification
- Domain: Eukaryota
- Kingdom: Animalia
- Phylum: Arthropoda
- Class: Insecta
- Order: Lepidoptera
- Family: Drepanidae
- Genus: Gaurena
- Species: G. delattini

Binomial name
- Gaurena delattini Werny, 1966

Species of false owlet moth

Gaurena delattini is a moth in the family Drepanidae. It is found in China (Sichuan, Yunnan, Tibet).
