= Isopsestis meyi =

Scientific classification
- Kingdom: Animalia
- Phylum: Arthropoda
- Clade: Pancrustacea
- Class: Insecta
- Order: Lepidoptera
- Family: Drepanidae
- Genus: Isopsestis
- Species: I. meyi

Binomial name
- Isopsestis meyi Laszlo, G. Ronkay, L. Ronkay & Witt, 2007

Species of false owlet moth

Isopsestis meyi is a moth in the family Drepanidae. It was described by Gyula M. László, Gábor Ronkay, László Aladár Ronkay and Thomas Joseph Witt in 2007. It is found in Vietnam.
