= Wernya thailandica =

Scientific classification
- Domain: Eukaryota
- Kingdom: Animalia
- Phylum: Arthropoda
- Class: Insecta
- Order: Lepidoptera
- Family: Drepanidae
- Genus: Wernya
- Species: W. thailandica

Binomial name
- Wernya thailandica Yoshimoto, 1987

Species of false owlet moth

Wernya thailandica is a moth in the family Drepanidae. It was described by Yoshimoto in 1987. It is found in Thailand, Vietnam and Yunnan, China.

== Subspecies ==
- Wernya thailandica thailandica (Thailand)
- Wernya thailandica pallescens Laszlo, Ronkay & Ronkay, 2001 (Vietnam, China: Yunnan)
