= Psidopala tenuis =

Scientific classification
- Kingdom: Animalia
- Phylum: Arthropoda
- Class: Insecta
- Order: Lepidoptera
- Family: Drepanidae
- Genus: Psidopala
- Species: P. tenuis

Binomial name
- Psidopala tenuis (Hampson, 1896)

Synonyms
- Gaurena tenuis Hampson, 1896; Psidopala tenuis falkneri Werny, 1966

Species of false owlet moth

Psidopala tenuis is a moth in the family Drepanidae. It was described by George Hampson in 1896. It is found in India, Nepal and Tibet, China.

The wingspan is about 34 mm. Adults are fuscous, the forewings with the basal area greyish, bounded by an obliquely sinuous line. There are small, dark-edged grey orbicular and reniform spots and an ill-defined sinuous grey line from the lower angle of the cell to the inner margin, as well as an irregular grey submarginal line joined by an oblique mark from the apex. The hindwings are grey.
