= Toxoides =

Scientific classification
- Domain: Eukaryota
- Kingdom: Animalia
- Phylum: Arthropoda
- Class: Insecta
- Order: Lepidoptera
- Family: Drepanidae
- Genus: Toxoides; Hampson, 1893

Moth genus in family Drepanidae

Toxoides is a genus of moths belonging to the subfamily Thyatirinae of the Drepanidae.

== Species ==
- Toxoides sichuanensis Zhuang, Owada & Wang, 2014
- Toxoides undulatus (Moore, 1867)
