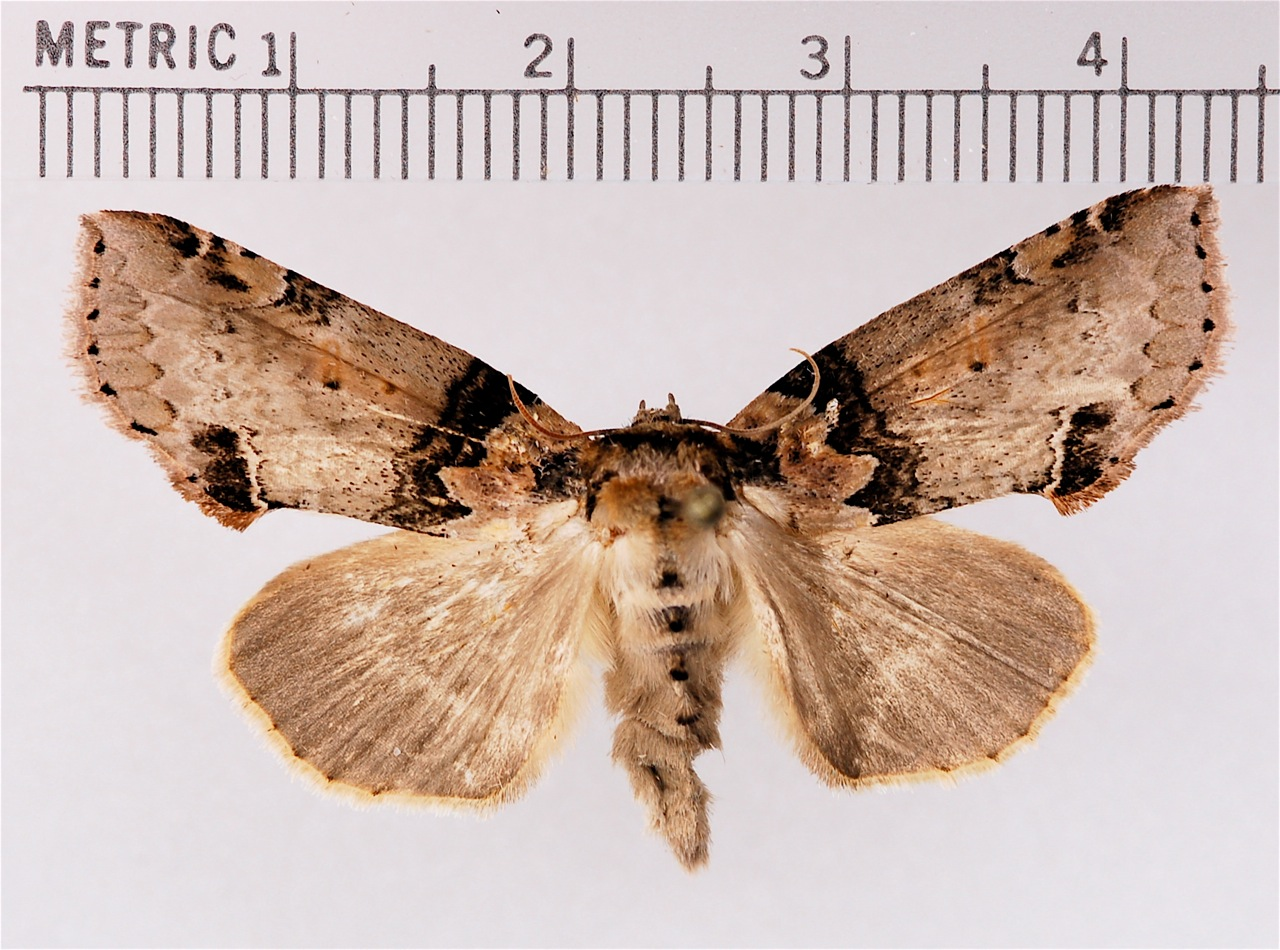

Scientific classification
- Kingdom: Animalia
- Phylum: Arthropoda
- Class: Insecta
- Order: Lepidoptera
- Family: Drepanidae
- Subfamily: Thyatirinae
- Genus: Pseudothyatira; Grote, 1864
- Species: P. cymatophoroides

Binomial name
- Pseudothyatira cymatophoroides (Guenée, 1852)

Synonyms
- Thyatira cymatophoroides Guenée, 1852

= Pseudothyatira =

Pseudothyatira cymatophoroides

Monotypic moth genus in family Drepanidae

Pseudothyatira is a monotypic moth genus of the family Drepanidae first described by Augustus Radcliffe Grote in 1864. Its only species, Pseudothyatira cymatophoroides, the tufted thyatirid moth, was first described by Achille Guenée in 1852. It is found in North America in Newfoundland, British Columbia, northern California, Maryland, West Virginia, Kansas and North Carolina.

The wingspan is 38–44 mm. The moth flies from June to September depending on the location.

The larvae feed on Betula nigra, Betula populifolia and Prunus virginiaca.
