= Euparyphasma maxima =

Scientific classification
- Domain: Eukaryota
- Kingdom: Animalia
- Phylum: Arthropoda
- Class: Insecta
- Order: Lepidoptera
- Family: Drepanidae
- Genus: Euparyphasma
- Species: E. maxima

Binomial name
- Euparyphasma maxima (Leech, 1888)

Synonyms
- Cymatophora maxima Leech, 1889

Species of false owlet moth

Euparyphasma maxima is a moth in the family Drepanidae. It is found in China (Shaanxi, Zhejiang, Hubei, Hunan), Japan and the Korean Peninsula.
