= Psidopala pennata =

Scientific classification
- Domain: Eukaryota
- Kingdom: Animalia
- Phylum: Arthropoda
- Class: Insecta
- Order: Lepidoptera
- Family: Drepanidae
- Genus: Psidopala
- Species: P. pennata

Binomial name
- Psidopala pennata (Wileman, 1914)

Synonyms
- Thyatira pennata Wileman, 1914

Species of false owlet moth

Psidopala pennata is a moth in the family Drepanidae. It was described by Wileman in 1914. It is found in Taiwan.
