= Psidopala ornata =

Scientific classification
- Domain: Eukaryota
- Kingdom: Animalia
- Phylum: Arthropoda
- Class: Insecta
- Order: Lepidoptera
- Family: Drepanidae
- Genus: Psidopala
- Species: P. ornata

Binomial name
- Psidopala ornata Leech, 1900

Synonyms
- Psidopala ornata yuennanensis Werny, 1966; Psidopala pseudornata Werny, 1966; Psidopala pseudornata indecorata Werny, 1966

Species of false owlet moth

Psidopala ornata is a moth in the family Drepanidae. It was described by John Henry Leech in 1900. It is found in the Chinese provinces of Sichuan and Yunnan.
