= Demopsestis yoshimotoi =

Scientific classification
- Kingdom: Animalia
- Phylum: Arthropoda
- Clade: Pancrustacea
- Class: Insecta
- Order: Lepidoptera
- Family: Drepanidae
- Genus: Demopsestis
- Species: D. yoshimotoi

Binomial name
- Demopsestis yoshimotoi Laszlo, G. Ronkay, L. Ronkay & Witt, 2007

Species of false owlet moth

Demopsestis yoshimotoi is a moth in the family Drepanidae. It is found in Thailand.
