= Euparyphasma obscura =

Scientific classification
- Domain: Eukaryota
- Kingdom: Animalia
- Phylum: Arthropoda
- Class: Insecta
- Order: Lepidoptera
- Family: Drepanidae
- Genus: Euparyphasma
- Species: E. obscura

Binomial name
- Euparyphasma obscura (Sick, 1941)

Synonyms
- Lithocharis obscura Sick, 1941

Species of false owlet moth

Euparyphasma obscura is a moth in the family Drepanidae. It is found in Yunnan in China and in Vietnam.
