= Camptopsestis =

Scientific classification
- Domain: Eukaryota
- Kingdom: Animalia
- Phylum: Arthropoda
- Class: Insecta
- Order: Lepidoptera
- Family: Drepanidae
- Subfamily: Thyatirinae
- Genus: Camptopsestis; Yoshimoto, 1983
- Species: C. malayana

Binomial name
- Camptopsestis malayana Yoshimoto, 1983

Monotypic moth genus in family Drepanidae

Camptopsestis is a monotypic moth genus in the family Drepanidae described by Yoshimoto in 1983. Its only species, Camptopsestis malayana, was described by the same author in the same year. It is found on Peninsular Malaysia, Sumatra and Borneo. The habitat consists of peat swamp forests and lowland to high montane areas.
