= Wernya hamigigantea =

Scientific classification
- Kingdom: Animalia
- Phylum: Arthropoda
- Clade: Pancrustacea
- Class: Insecta
- Order: Lepidoptera
- Family: Drepanidae
- Genus: Wernya
- Species: W. hamigigantea

Binomial name
- Wernya hamigigantea D.Y. Xue & H.X. Han, 2012

Species of false owlet moth

Wernya hamigigantea is a moth in the family Drepanidae. It was described by Da-Yong Xue and Hong-Xiang Han in 2012. It is found in Hainan, China.
