= Euparyphasma albibasis =

Scientific classification
- Kingdom: Animalia
- Phylum: Arthropoda
- Class: Insecta
- Order: Lepidoptera
- Family: Drepanidae
- Genus: Euparyphasma
- Species: E. albibasis

Binomial name
- Euparyphasma albibasis (Hampson, 1893)

Synonyms
- Polyploca albibasis Hampson, 1893; Lithocharis cinereofusca Houlbert, 1921

Species of false owlet moth

Euparyphasma albibasis is a moth in the family Drepanidae first described by George Hampson in 1893. It is found in India, Taiwan and China.

The wingspan is about 68 mm. The forewings are silvery grey, with a white base and a whitish fascia along the costa from one-fifth from the base to the apex. There are waved antemedial and postmedial dark lines and a submarginal series of white specks. The hindwings are pale fuscous, the outer area darker.

== Subspecies ==
- Euparyphasma albibasis albibasis (India)
- Euparyphasma albibasis cinereofusca (Houlbert, 1921) (Vietnam, China: Sichuan, Yunnan)
- Euparyphasma albibasis guankaiyuni Laszlo, G. Ronkay, L. Ronkay & Witt, 2007 (China: Shaanxi, Gansu, Hubei, Jiangxi, Hunan, Fujian, Guangdong, Guangxi)
