= Gaurena olivacea =

Scientific classification
- Domain: Eukaryota
- Kingdom: Animalia
- Phylum: Arthropoda
- Class: Insecta
- Order: Lepidoptera
- Family: Drepanidae
- Genus: Gaurena
- Species: G. olivacea

Binomial name
- Gaurena olivacea Houlbert, 1921

Species of false owlet moth

Gaurena olivacea is a moth in the family Drepanidae. It is found in the Chinese provinces of Yunnan and Sichuan.
