= Mesopsestis =

Scientific classification
- Domain: Eukaryota
- Kingdom: Animalia
- Phylum: Arthropoda
- Class: Insecta
- Order: Lepidoptera
- Family: Drepanidae
- Subfamily: Thyatirinae
- Genus: Mesopsestis; Matsumura, 1921
- Species: M. undosa

Binomial name
- Mesopsestis undosa (Wileman, 1911)

Synonyms
- Palimpsestes undosa Wileman, 1911; Mesopsestis wilemani Matsumura, 1933

Monotypic moth genus in family Drepanidae

Mesopsestis is a monotypic moth genus belonging to the subfamily Thyatirinae of the Drepanidae and was described by Shōnen Matsumura in 1921. Its single species, Mesopsestis undosa, was described by Wileman in 1911. It is found in Japan.

The wingspan is about 40 mm. The forewings are greyish white suffused with brownish except on the costal area. There is a black subbasal line and the antemedial band is greyish brown, broad and traversed by a double curved black line, preceded by a black wavy line which becomes indistinct towards the costa, and followed by a double, sinuous black line. The postmedial line is black, crenulate and slightly curved and the submarginal line is pale. There is a brownish spot at its costal extremity, and a short blackish dash from it to the apex of the wing. The discal mark is black and linear. The hindwings are pale fuscous.
