= Psidopala roseola =

Scientific classification
- Domain: Eukaryota
- Kingdom: Animalia
- Phylum: Arthropoda
- Class: Insecta
- Order: Lepidoptera
- Family: Drepanidae
- Genus: Psidopala
- Species: P. roseola

Binomial name
- Psidopala roseola Werny, 1966

Species of false owlet moth

Psidopala roseola is a moth in the family Drepanidae. It was described by Werny in 1966. It is found in Shaanxi, China.
