= Wernya sechuana =

Scientific classification
- Domain: Eukaryota
- Kingdom: Animalia
- Phylum: Arthropoda
- Class: Insecta
- Order: Lepidoptera
- Family: Drepanidae
- Genus: Wernya
- Species: W. sechuana

Binomial name
- Wernya sechuana László, G. Ronkay & L. Ronkay, 2001

Species of false owlet moth

Wernya sechuana is a moth in the family Drepanidae. It was described by Gyula M. László, Gábor Ronkay and László Aladár Ronkay in 2001. It is found in the Chinese provinces of Hubei, Sichuan and Yunnan.
