= Isopsestis =

Scientific classification
- Domain: Eukaryota
- Kingdom: Animalia
- Phylum: Arthropoda
- Class: Insecta
- Order: Lepidoptera
- Family: Drepanidae
- Subfamily: Thyatirinae
- Genus: Isopsestis; Werny, 1968

Moth genus in family Drepanidae

Isopsestis is a genus of moths belonging to the subfamily Thyatirinae. The genus was described by Werny in 1968.

== Species ==
- Isopsestis cuprina (Moore, 1881)
- Isopsestis meyi Laszlo, G. Ronkay, L. Ronkay & Witt, 2007
- Isopsestis moorei Laszlo, G. Ronkay, L. Ronkay & Witt, 2007
- Isopsestis naumanni Laszlo, G. Ronkay, L. Ronkay & Witt, 2007
