= Bycombia =

Scientific classification
- Domain: Eukaryota
- Kingdom: Animalia
- Phylum: Arthropoda
- Class: Insecta
- Order: Lepidoptera
- Family: Drepanidae
- Subfamily: Thyatirinae
- Genus: Bycombia; Benjamin, 1938
- Species: B. verdugoensis

Binomial name
- Bycombia verdugoensis (Hill, 1927)

Synonyms
- Bombycia verdugoensis Hill, 1927

Monotypic moth genus in family Drepanidae

Bycombia verdugoensis is a moth in the subfamily Thyatirinae and only member of the genus Bycombia. It was described by Hill in 1927. It is found in North America, where it has been recorded from southern California.

The wingspan is about 33 mm for females and 30 mm for males. The forewings are blackish grey, tinged with rufous and irrorated with black. The basal line is obsolescent and there is double black line which is waved and jet black distally. The space between the double lines is tinged with rufous. The median line is blackish and there is an oblique black apical dash connected to a pale waved line, as well as a thin black terminal line. The hindwings are fuscous. Adults are on wing from January to April.
