= Isopsestis cuprina =

Scientific classification
- Domain: Eukaryota
- Kingdom: Animalia
- Phylum: Arthropoda
- Class: Insecta
- Order: Lepidoptera
- Family: Drepanidae
- Genus: Isopsestis
- Species: I. cuprina

Binomial name
- Isopsestis cuprina (Moore, 1881)

Synonyms
- Palimpsestis cuprina Moore, 1881

Species of false owlet moth

Isopsestis cuprina is a moth in the family Drepanidae. It was described by Frederic Moore in 1881. It is found in India (Darjeeling), Nepal, and Tibet.

The wingspan is about 33 mm (1 3/10 in). The forewings are pale metallic brown, slightly cupreous anteriorly and the area below the cell is greenish. There are two or three black transverse antemedian lines angled at the median vein and some basal spots, a black discocellular recurved mark and a spot within the cell. There are five or six transverse discal indistinct sinuous lines with black and white dentate marks on the veins, as well as a submarginal pale lunular line and a marginal black line. The hindwings are pale cupreous white, with a pale cupreous-brown marginal band.
