= Kurama mirabilis =

Scientific classification
- Domain: Eukaryota
- Kingdom: Animalia
- Phylum: Arthropoda
- Class: Insecta
- Order: Lepidoptera
- Family: Drepanidae
- Genus: Kurama
- Species: K. mirabilis

Binomial name
- Kurama mirabilis (Butler, 1879)

Synonyms
- Xylina mirabilis Butler, 1879

Species of false owlet moth

Kurama mirabilis is a moth in the family Drepanidae. It was described by Arthur Gardiner Butler in 1879. It is found in Japan.

The wingspan is 34–44 mm. The costal half of the forewings is pearly white and the internal half pale bronzy brown. There is a black spot at the base of the interno-median interspace and an oblique dark brown fasciole from the costal margin to the median vein at the basal fifth. The costa beyond this fasciole is dark brown and there is a slightly oblique longitudinal brown stripe from the apex to just beyond the cell, where it joins a slender, postmedian, irregular, transverse line. A similar line is found from the interior extremity of the subbasal fasciole and there is a maculated, white-edged, dark brown submarginal line, as well as a very indistinct transverse line between the latter and the discal line. There is also a dark brown marginal crenulated line and a black spot at the end of the cell. The hindwings are white, with a pale brownish outer border.
