= Toxoides sichuanensis =

Scientific classification
- Domain: Eukaryota
- Kingdom: Animalia
- Phylum: Arthropoda
- Class: Insecta
- Order: Lepidoptera
- Family: Drepanidae
- Genus: Toxoides
- Species: T. sichuanensis

Binomial name
- Toxoides sichuanensis Zhuang, Owada & Wang, 2014

Species of false owlet moth

Toxoides sichuanensis is a moth in the family Drepanidae. It was described by Zhuang, Owada and Wang in 2014. It is found in China (Sichuan).
