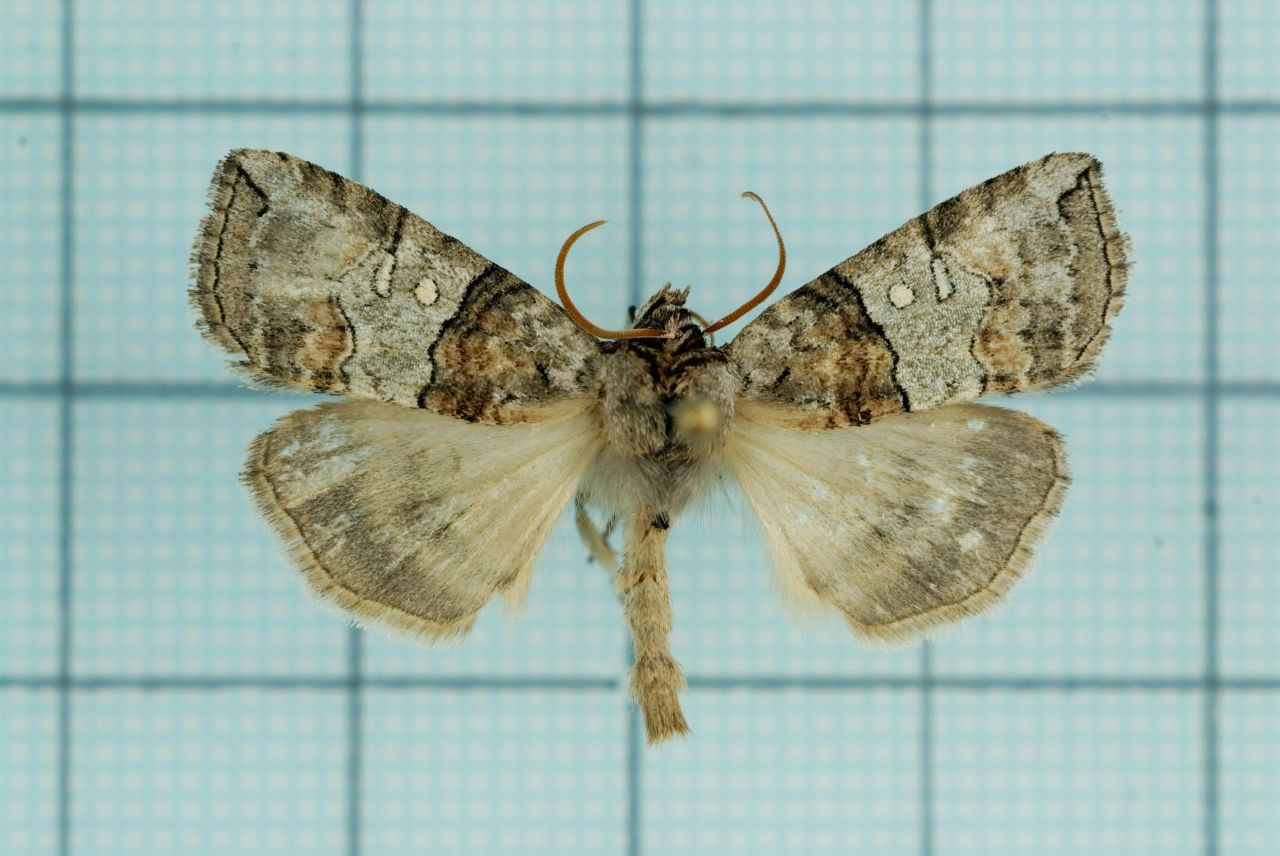
- Nothoploca endoi

Scientific classification
- Kingdom: Animalia
- Phylum: Arthropoda
- Clade: Pancrustacea
- Class: Insecta
- Order: Lepidoptera
- Family: Drepanidae
- Subfamily: Thyatirinae
- Genus: Nothoploca; Yoshimoto, 1983

= Nothoploca =

Moth genus in family Drepanidae

Nothoploca is a genus of moths belonging to the subfamily Thyatirinae within the family Drepanidae, or alternatively, to the family Thyatiridae. They are small, autumn-flying moths.

== Species ==
There are two recognized species:

- Nothoploca endoi Yoshimoto, 1983
- Nothoploca nigripunctata (Warren, 1915)
