= Gaurena argentisparsa =

Scientific classification
- Domain: Eukaryota
- Kingdom: Animalia
- Phylum: Arthropoda
- Class: Insecta
- Order: Lepidoptera
- Family: Drepanidae
- Genus: Gaurena
- Species: G. argentisparsa

Binomial name
- Gaurena argentisparsa Hampson, 1896

Synonyms
- Gaurena argentisparsa eberti Werny, 1966

Species of false owlet moth

Gaurena argentisparsa is a moth in the family Drepanidae. It is found in Bhutan, Nepal, Sikkim in India and in Tibet, China.

The wingspan is about 36 mm. The forewings are grey, irrorated (sprinkled) with black and with a black-edged white spot at the base below the median nervure and a white antemedial band edged by irregularly-waved black lines. There is a small black-edged white orbicular and large round reniform stigma, with a black-edged white band from it to the inner margin, its inner edge dentate. There is also a waved postmedial line with a diffused white band beyond it forking to the apex, as well as some submarginal white specks and an irregular patch at the anal angle and a marginal series of white lunules. The hindwings are fuscous, with traces of postmedial and submarginal lines towards the inner margin.
