= Gaurena grisescens =

Scientific classification
- Domain: Eukaryota
- Kingdom: Animalia
- Phylum: Arthropoda
- Class: Insecta
- Order: Lepidoptera
- Family: Drepanidae
- Genus: Gaurena
- Species: G. grisescens

Binomial name
- Gaurena grisescens Oberthür, 1894

Synonyms
- Griseogaurena grisescens

Species of false owlet moth

Gaurena grisescens is a moth in the family Drepanidae. It is found in China (Yunnan, Sichuan, Tibet).
