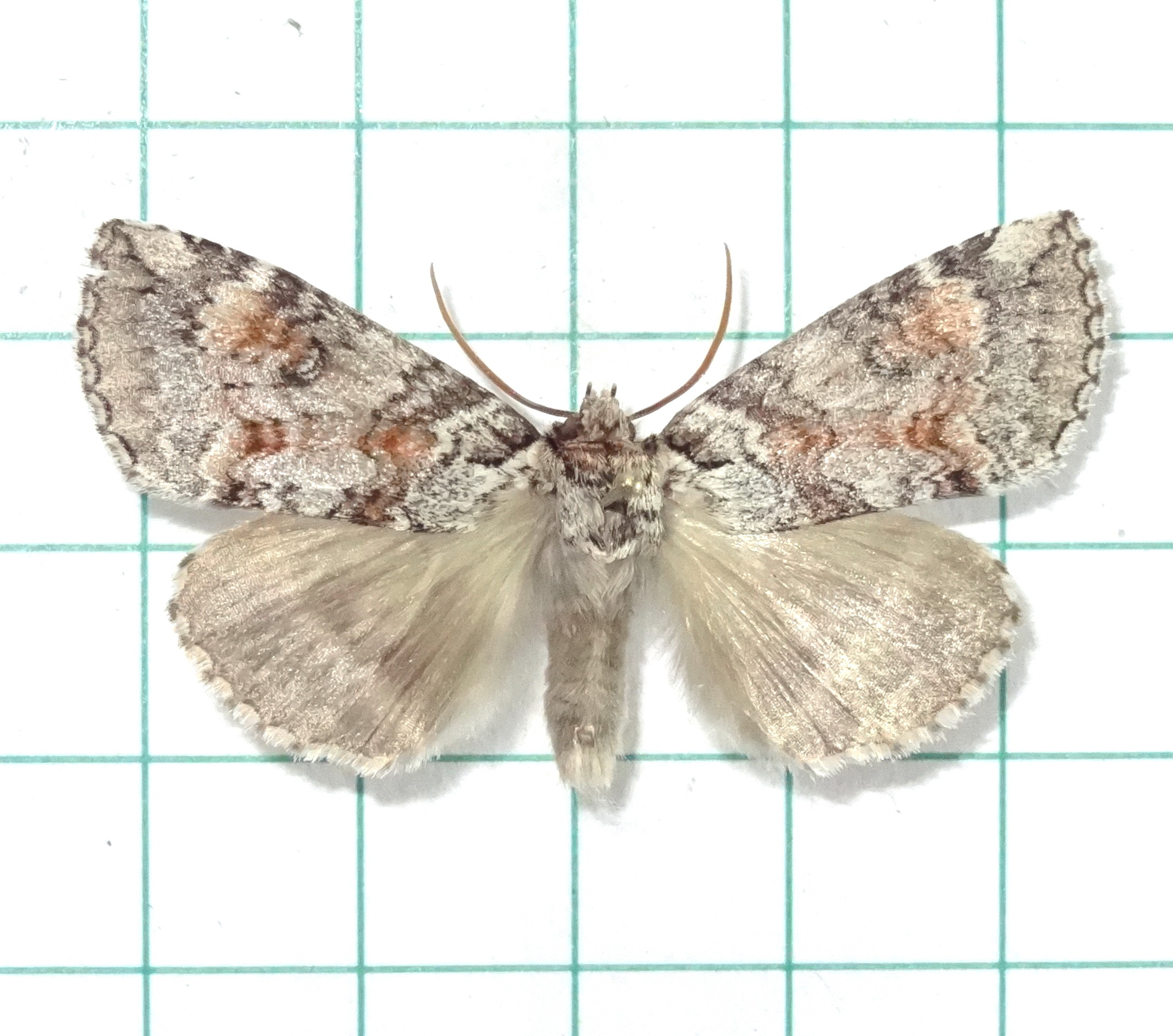

Scientific classification
- Kingdom: Animalia
- Phylum: Arthropoda
- Class: Insecta
- Order: Lepidoptera
- Family: Drepanidae
- Subfamily: Thyatirinae
- Genus: Wernya; Yoshimoto, 1987

= Wernya =

Moth genus in family Drepanidae

Wernya is a genus of moths belonging to the subfamily Thyatirinae of the Drepanidae. It was described by Yoshimoto in 1987.

== Species ==
- griseochrysa species group
  - Wernya griseochrysa László, G. Ronkay & L. Ronkay, 2001
  - Wernya hreblayi László, G. Ronkay, L. Ronkay & Witt, 2007
- lineofracta species group
  - Wernya cyrtoma D.-Y. Xue & H.-X. Han, 2012
  - Wernya karsholti László, G. Ronkay & L. Ronkay, 2001
  - Wernya lineofracta (Houlbert, 1921)
  - Wernya sechuana László, G. Ronkay & L. Ronkay, 2001
  - Wernya witti László, G. Ronkay & L. Ronkay, 2001
- punctata species group
  - Wernya punctata Yoshimoto, 1987
- rufifasciata species group
  - Wernya rufifasciata Yoshimoto, 1987
- solena species group
  - Wernya baenzigeri Yoshimoto, 1996
  - Wernya solena (C. Swinhoe, 1894)
  - Wernya zita Laszlo, G. Ronkay, L. Ronkay & Witt, 2007
- thailandica species group
  - Wernya thailandica Yoshimoto, 1987
- unknown species group
  - Wernya hamigigantea D.-Y. Xue & H.-X. Han, 2012
