= Gaurena florescens =

Scientific classification
- Kingdom: Animalia
- Phylum: Arthropoda
- Class: Insecta
- Order: Lepidoptera
- Family: Drepanidae
- Genus: Gaurena
- Species: G. florescens

Binomial name
- Gaurena florescens Walker, 1865

Synonyms
- Gaurena florescens albomaculata Werny, 1966; Gaurena florescens burmanica Werny, 1966; Gaurena gemella flavescens Werny, 1966

Species of false owlet moth

Gaurena florescens is a moth in the family Drepanidae. It is found in Nepal, India (Darjeeling, Sikkim), Myanmar, China (Hubei, Hunan, Guangdong, Sichuan, Yunnan, Tibet), Bangladesh and Cambodia.

The wingspan is about 42 mm. Adults are similar to Gaurena florens, but the head and thorax are spotted with yellow, the waved subbasal band of the forewings is replaced by a spot on the costa and one below the median nervure, the spot at the end of the cell is large and the postmedial spot is placed below the costa. Furthermore, the patches at the apex and near the outer angle are smaller and the marginal series is larger.
