= Demopsestis punctigera =

Scientific classification
- Kingdom: Animalia
- Phylum: Arthropoda
- Clade: Pancrustacea
- Class: Insecta
- Order: Lepidoptera
- Family: Drepanidae
- Genus: Demopsestis
- Species: D. punctigera

Binomial name
- Demopsestis punctigera (Butler, 1885)

Synonyms
- Asphalia punctigera Butler, 1885

Species of false owlet moth

Demopsestis punctigera is a moth in the family Drepanidae. It was described by Arthur Gardiner Butler in 1885. It is found in Japan (all the main islands), Korea, and the Chinese provinces of Jilin, Shaanxi, and Jiangsu.

The wingspan is 33–40 mm.
