= Euparyphasma =

Scientific classification
- Domain: Eukaryota
- Kingdom: Animalia
- Phylum: Arthropoda
- Class: Insecta
- Order: Lepidoptera
- Family: Drepanidae
- Subfamily: Thyatirinae
- Genus: Euparyphasma; D. S. Fletcher, 1979

Synonyms
- Lithocharis Warren, 1912

Moth genus in family Drepanidae

Euparyphasma is a genus of moths belonging to the subfamily Thyatirinae of the Drepanidae. It was described by David Stephen Fletcher in 1979.

== Species ==
- Euparyphasma albibasis Hampson, 1893
- Euparyphasma obscura Sick, 1941
- Euparyphasma maxima Leech, 1888

== Former species ==
- Euparyphasma cinereofusca Houlbert, 1921
