= Nephoploca =

Scientific classification
- Kingdom: Animalia
- Phylum: Arthropoda
- Class: Insecta
- Order: Lepidoptera
- Family: Drepanidae
- Subfamily: Thyatirinae
- Genus: Nephoploca; Yoshimoto, 1988
- Species: N. hoenei

Binomial name
- Nephoploca hoenei (Sick, 1941)

Synonyms
- Polyploca hoenei Sick, 1941

Monotypic moth genus in family Drepanidae

Nephoploca hoenei is a moth in the family Drepanidae and the only species in the genus Nephoploca. It was described by Sick in 1941. It is found in the Chinese provinces of Shaanxi, Gansu and Sichuan.
