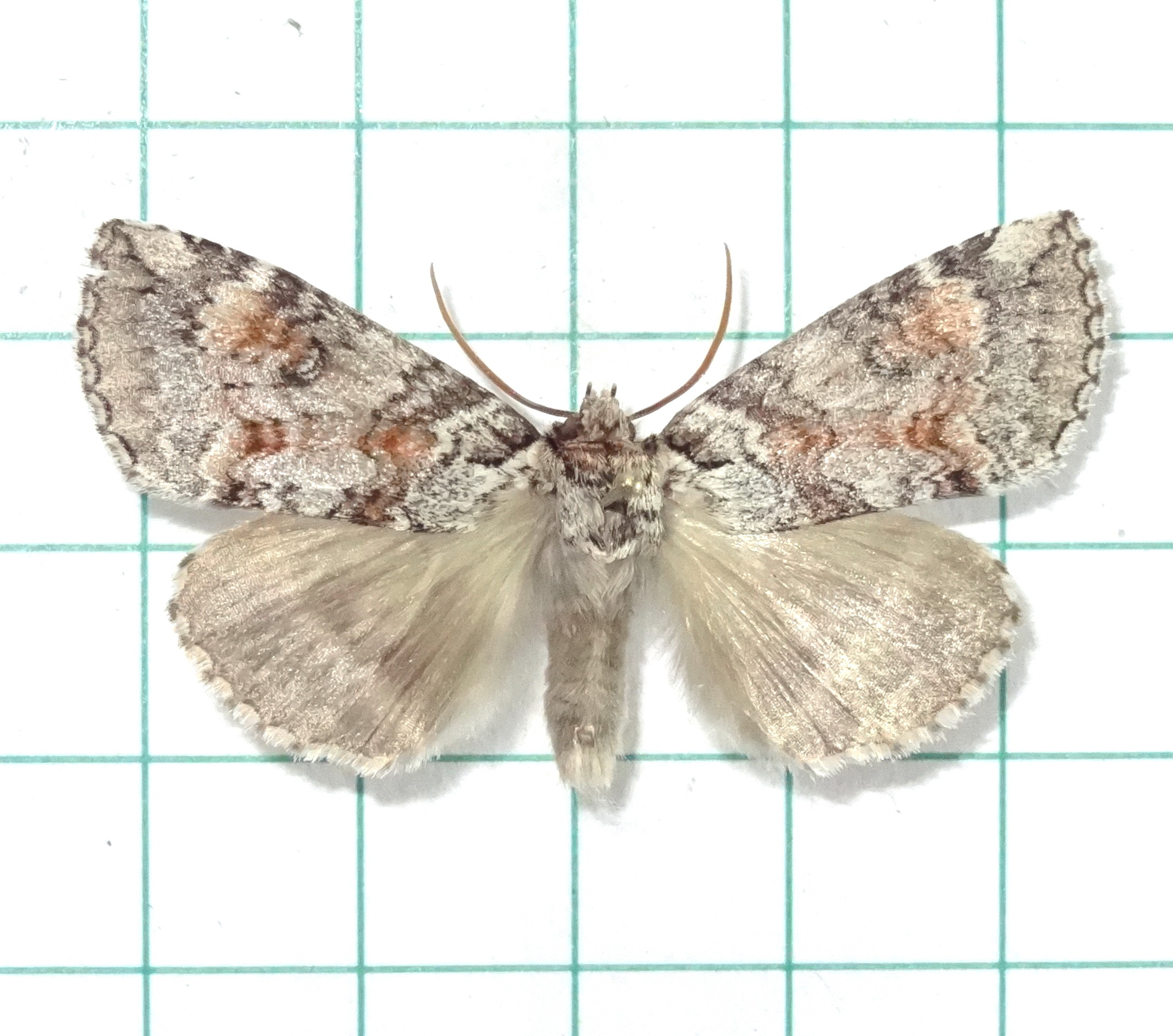

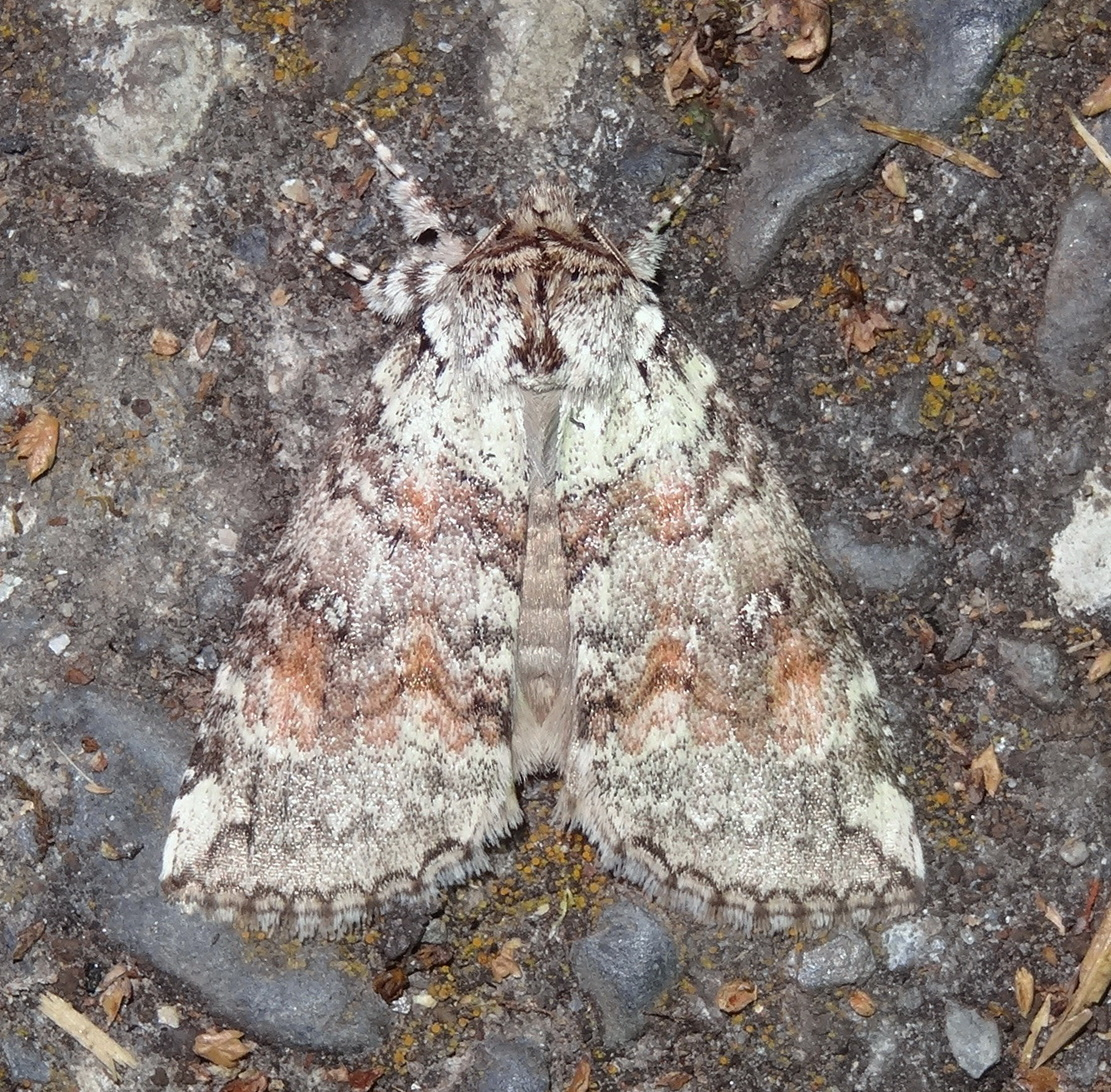

Scientific classification
- Domain: Eukaryota
- Kingdom: Animalia
- Phylum: Arthropoda
- Class: Insecta
- Order: Lepidoptera
- Family: Drepanidae
- Genus: Wernya
- Species: W. rufifasciata

Binomial name
- Wernya rufifasciata Yoshimoto, 1987

= Wernya rufifasciata =

Species of false owlet moth

Wernya rufifasciata is a moth in the family Drepanidae. It was described by Yoshimoto in 1987. It is found in Taiwan.
