= Chiropsestis =

Scientific classification
- Kingdom: Animalia
- Phylum: Arthropoda
- Class: Insecta
- Order: Lepidoptera
- Family: Drepanidae
- Subfamily: Thyatirinae
- Genus: Chiropsestis; László, G. Ronkay & L. Ronkay, 2001
- Species: C. rubrocinerea

Binomial name
- Chiropsestis rubrocinerea László, G. Ronkay & L. Ronkay, 2001

Monotypic moth genus in family Drepanidae

Chiropsestis is a monotypic moth genus in the family Drepanidae. Its only species, Chiropsestis rubrocinerea, is found in Vietnam and Hainan, China. Both the genus and the species were described by Gyula M. László, Gábor Ronkay and László Aladár Ronkay in 2001.
