= Neodaruma =

Scientific classification
- Domain: Eukaryota
- Kingdom: Animalia
- Phylum: Arthropoda
- Class: Insecta
- Order: Lepidoptera
- Family: Drepanidae
- Subfamily: Thyatirinae
- Genus: Neodaruma; Matsumura, 1933
- Species: N. tamanukii

Binomial name
- Neodaruma tamanukii Matsumura, 1933

Monotypic moth genus in family Drepanidae

Neodaruma tamanukii is a moth in the family Drepanidae and the only species in the genus Neodaruma. The species and genus were described by Shōnen Matsumura in 1933. It is found in China (Inner Mongolia), south-eastern Russia and Japan.
