= Psidopala =

Scientific classification
- Domain: Eukaryota
- Kingdom: Animalia
- Phylum: Arthropoda
- Class: Insecta
- Order: Lepidoptera
- Family: Drepanidae
- Subfamily: Thyatirinae
- Genus: Psidopala; Houlbert, 1921

Synonyms
- Psidopaloides Houlbert, 1921; Formotogaria Matsumura, 1933

Moth genus in family Drepanidae

Psidopala is a genus of moths belonging to the subfamily Thyatirinae of the Drepanidae.

== Species ==
- Psidopala apicalis (Leech, 1900)
- Psidopala kishidai Yoshimoto, 1987
- Psidopala opalescens (Alphéraky, 1897)
- Psidopala ornata (Leech, 1900)
- Psidopala paeoniola Laszlo, G. Ronkay, L. Ronkay & Witt, 2007
- Psidopala pennata (Wileman, 1914)
- Psidopala roseola Werny, 1966
- Psidopala shirakii (Matsumura, 1931)
- Psidopala tenuis (Hampson, 1896)
- Psidopala undulans (Hampson, 1893)
- Psidopala warreni Laszlo, G. Ronkay, L. Ronkay & Witt, 2007
