= Gaurena albifasciata =

Scientific classification
- Domain: Eukaryota
- Kingdom: Animalia
- Phylum: Arthropoda
- Class: Insecta
- Order: Lepidoptera
- Family: Drepanidae
- Genus: Gaurena
- Species: G. albifasciata

Binomial name
- Gaurena albifasciata Gaede, 1931

Synonyms
- Gaurena albifasciata nepalensis Werny, 1966

Species of false owlet moth

Gaurena albifasciata is a moth in the family Drepanidae. It is found in India, Nepal and China (Yunnan, Tibet).
