= Wernya griseochrysa =

Scientific classification
- Domain: Eukaryota
- Kingdom: Animalia
- Phylum: Arthropoda
- Class: Insecta
- Order: Lepidoptera
- Family: Drepanidae
- Genus: Wernya
- Species: W. griseochrysa

Binomial name
- Wernya griseochrysa László, G. Ronkay & L. Ronkay, 2001

Species of false owlet moth

Wernya griseochrysa is a moth in the family Drepanidae. It was described by Gyula M. László, Gábor Ronkay and László Aladár Ronkay in 2001. It is found in Vietnam and Hainan, China.

== Subspecies ==
- Wernya griseochrysa griseochrysa (Vietnam)
- Wernya griseochrysa hainanensis Xue, Yang & Han, 2012 (China: Hainan)
