= Isopsestis naumanni =

Scientific classification
- Kingdom: Animalia
- Phylum: Arthropoda
- Clade: Pancrustacea
- Class: Insecta
- Order: Lepidoptera
- Family: Drepanidae
- Genus: Isopsestis
- Species: I. naumanni

Binomial name
- Isopsestis naumanni László, G. Ronkay, L. Ronkay & Witt, 2007

Species of false owlet moth

Isopsestis naumanni is a moth in the family Drepanidae. It was described by Gyula M. László, Gábor Ronkay, László Aladár Ronkay and Thomas Joseph Witt in 2007. It is found in the Chinese provinces of Shaanxi, Gansu, Hubei, Guangxi and Sichuan.
