= Psidopala apicalis =

Scientific classification
- Domain: Eukaryota
- Kingdom: Animalia
- Phylum: Arthropoda
- Class: Insecta
- Order: Lepidoptera
- Family: Drepanidae
- Genus: Psidopala
- Species: P. apicalis

Binomial name
- Psidopala apicalis (Leech, 1900)

Synonyms
- Thyatira apicalis Leech, 1900

Species of false owlet moth

Psidopala apicalis is a moth in the family Drepanidae. It was described by John Henry Leech in 1900. It is found in the Chinese provinces of Gansu, Ningxia, Hubei and Sichuan.
