= Toxoides undulatus =

Scientific classification
- Domain: Eukaryota
- Kingdom: Animalia
- Phylum: Arthropoda
- Class: Insecta
- Order: Lepidoptera
- Family: Drepanidae
- Genus: Toxoides
- Species: T. undulatus

Binomial name
- Toxoides undulatus (Moore, 1867)

Synonyms
- Osica undulatus Moore, 1867; Toxoides longipennis Hampson, 1893; Toxoides emphloius Bryk, 1943

Species of false owlet moth

Toxoides undulatus is a moth in the family Drepanidae. It was described by Frederic Moore in 1867. It is found in India, Myanmar, Nepal, Vietnam, Thailand and Yunnan, China.

The forewings are dark ferruginous brown, suffused with grey broadly from the posterior angle. There are numerous transverse blackish pale-bordered undulating lines, and a marginal lunulated line. The hindwings are a brownish-fawn colour.
