= Psidopala paeoniola =

Scientific classification
- Kingdom: Animalia
- Phylum: Arthropoda
- Clade: Pancrustacea
- Class: Insecta
- Order: Lepidoptera
- Family: Drepanidae
- Genus: Psidopala
- Species: P. paeoniola

Binomial name
- Psidopala paeoniola László, G. Ronkay, L. Ronkay & Witt, 2007

Species of false owlet moth

Psidopala paeoniola is a moth in the family Drepanidae. It was described by Gyula M. László, Gábor Ronkay, László Aladár Ronkay and Thomas Joseph Witt in 2007. It is found in the Chinese provinces of Shaanxi and Gansu.
