= Psidopala warreni =

Scientific classification
- Kingdom: Animalia
- Phylum: Arthropoda
- Clade: Pancrustacea
- Class: Insecta
- Order: Lepidoptera
- Family: Drepanidae
- Genus: Psidopala
- Species: P. warreni

Binomial name
- Psidopala warreni László, G. Ronkay, L. Ronkay & Witt, 2007

Species of false owlet moth

Psidopala warreni is a moth in the family Drepanidae. It was described by Gyula M. László, Gábor Ronkay, László Aladár Ronkay and Thomas Joseph Witt in 2007. It is found in Shaanxi, China.
