= Gaurena margaritha =

Scientific classification
- Domain: Eukaryota
- Kingdom: Animalia
- Phylum: Arthropoda
- Class: Insecta
- Order: Lepidoptera
- Family: Drepanidae
- Genus: Gaurena
- Species: G. margaritha

Binomial name
- Gaurena margaritha Werny, 1966

Synonyms
- Gaurena albifasciata likiangensis Werny, 1966

Species of false owlet moth

Gaurena margaritha is a moth in the family Drepanidae. It is found in China (Sichuan, Yunnan, Tibet).
