= Paragnorima =

Scientific classification
- Domain: Eukaryota
- Kingdom: Animalia
- Phylum: Arthropoda
- Class: Insecta
- Order: Lepidoptera
- Family: Drepanidae
- Subfamily: Thyatirinae
- Genus: Paragnorima; Warren, 1912

Moth genus in family Drepanidae

Paragnorima is a genus of moths belonging to the subfamily Thyatirinae of the Drepanidae.

== Species ==
- Paragnorima fuscescens (Hampson, 1893)

== Former species ==
- Paragnorima brunnea Leech, 1900
- Paragnorima transitans (Houlbert, 1921)
