= Koedfoltos =

Scientific classification
- Kingdom: Animalia
- Phylum: Arthropoda
- Clade: Pancrustacea
- Class: Insecta
- Order: Lepidoptera
- Family: Drepanidae
- Subfamily: Thyatirinae
- Genus: Koedfoltos; Laszlo, G.Ronkay, L.Ronkay & Witt, 2007

Moth genus in family Drepanidae

Koedfoltos is a genus of moths belonging to the subfamily Thyatirinae of the Drepanidae.

== Species ==
- Koedfoltos hackeri Laszlo, G.Ronkay, L.Ronkay & Witt, 2007
- Koedfoltos parducka Laszlo, G.Ronkay, L.Ronkay & Witt, 2007
