= Wernya baenzigeri =

Scientific classification
- Domain: Eukaryota
- Kingdom: Animalia
- Phylum: Arthropoda
- Class: Insecta
- Order: Lepidoptera
- Family: Drepanidae
- Genus: Wernya
- Species: W. baenzigeri

Binomial name
- Wernya baenzigeri Yoshimoto, 1996

Synonyms
- Wernya solena baenzigeri Yoshimoto, 1996

Species of false owlet moth

Wernya baenzigeri is a moth in the family Drepanidae. It was described by Yoshimoto in 1996. It is found in Thailand.
