= Psidopala kishidai =

Scientific classification
- Domain: Eukaryota
- Kingdom: Animalia
- Phylum: Arthropoda
- Class: Insecta
- Order: Lepidoptera
- Family: Drepanidae
- Genus: Psidopala
- Species: P. kishidai

Binomial name
- Psidopala kishidai Yoshimoto, 1987

Species of false owlet moth

Psidopala kishidai is a moth in the family Drepanidae. It was described by Yoshimoto in 1987. It is found in Taiwan.
