= Psidopala undulans =

Scientific classification
- Kingdom: Animalia
- Phylum: Arthropoda
- Class: Insecta
- Order: Lepidoptera
- Family: Drepanidae
- Genus: Psidopala
- Species: P. undulans

Binomial name
- Psidopala undulans (Hampson, 1893)

Synonyms
- Thyatira undulans Hampson, 1893; Psidopala ebba Bryk, 1943

Species of false owlet moth

Psidopala undulans is a moth in the family Drepanidae. It was described by George Hampson in 1893. It is found in Myanmar, India and Tibet, China.
