= Wernya solena =

Scientific classification
- Domain: Eukaryota
- Kingdom: Animalia
- Phylum: Arthropoda
- Class: Insecta
- Order: Lepidoptera
- Family: Drepanidae
- Genus: Wernya
- Species: W. solena

Binomial name
- Wernya solena (Swinhoe, 1894)

Synonyms
- Gaurena solena Swinhoe, 1894; Tethea solena Swinhoe, 1894

Species of false owlet moth

Wernya solena is a moth in the family Drepanidae. It was described by Charles Swinhoe in 1894. It is found in Assam, India.

The wingspan is about 37 mm. The forewings are silvery grey, the medial area suffused with rufous and with two double dark lines on it which almost meet below the cell. There is a nearly straight erect postmedial line and an ochreous-white costal patch before the apex, with an indistinct dentate submarginal line arising from it. There is also a dark marginal line. The hindwings are fuscous, the basal area and a medial band paler.
