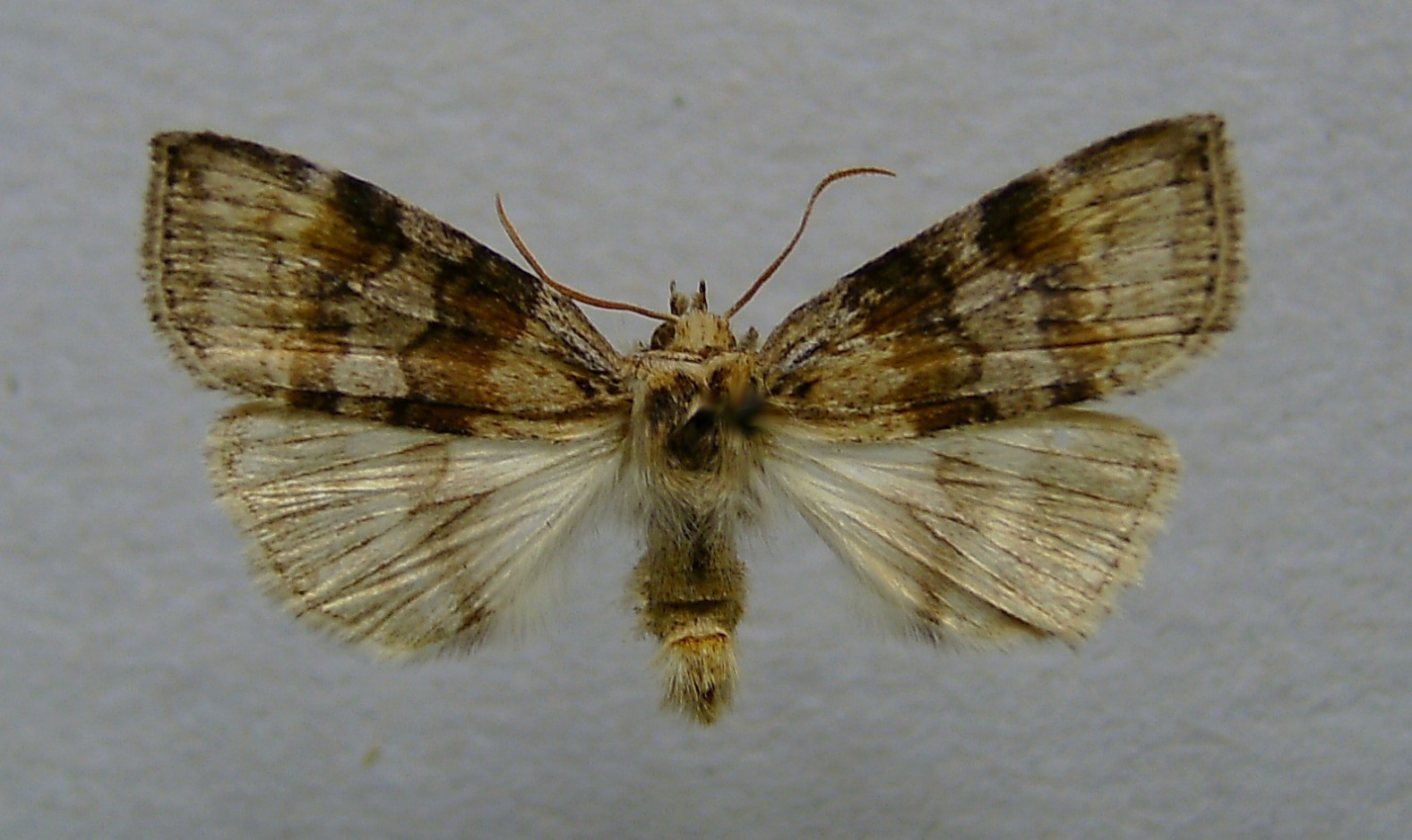

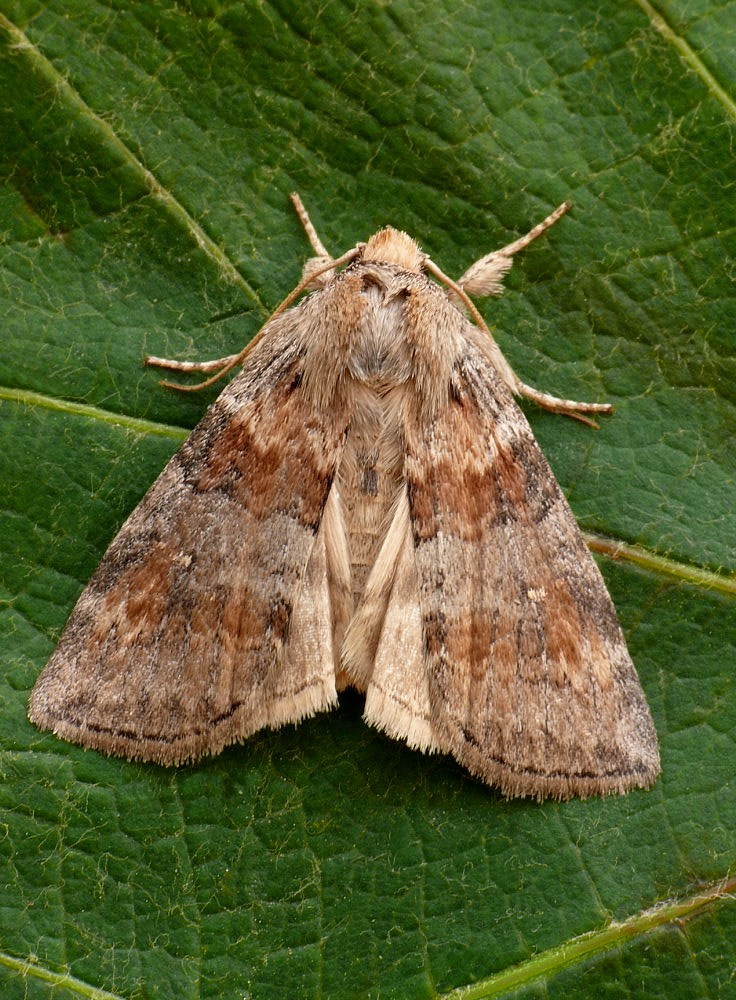

Scientific classification
- Domain: Eukaryota
- Kingdom: Animalia
- Phylum: Arthropoda
- Class: Insecta
- Order: Lepidoptera
- Family: Drepanidae
- Subfamily: Thyatirinae
- Genus: Cymatophorina; Spuler, 1908
- Species: C. diluta

Binomial name
- Cymatophorina diluta (Denis & Schiffermüller, 1775)

Synonyms
- Pachycera Stephens, in Anonymous 1827; Noctua diluta Denis & Schiffermüller, 1775; Cymatophorima diluta; Noctua abietis Ernst & Engramelle, 1785; Bombyx undata Fabricius, 1787; Bombyx bistrigata Borkhausen, 1790; Bombyx fasciculosa Borkhausen, 1790; Polyploca diluta f. hartwiegi Reisser, 1927

= Cymatophorina =

Genus of moths

Cymatophorina is a monotypic moth genus of the family Drepanidae first described by Arnold Spuler in 1908. Its only species, Cymatophorina diluta, the oak lutestring or lesser lutestring, was described by Michael Denis and Ignaz Schiffermüller in 1775. It is found in much of Europe, with subspecies Cymatophorina diluta hartwiegi occurring in Britain.

The wingspan is 33–36 mm. The species is univoltine. Adults are on wing between late July and early October, depending on location. Subspecies Cymatophorina diluta hartwiegi flies in August and September.

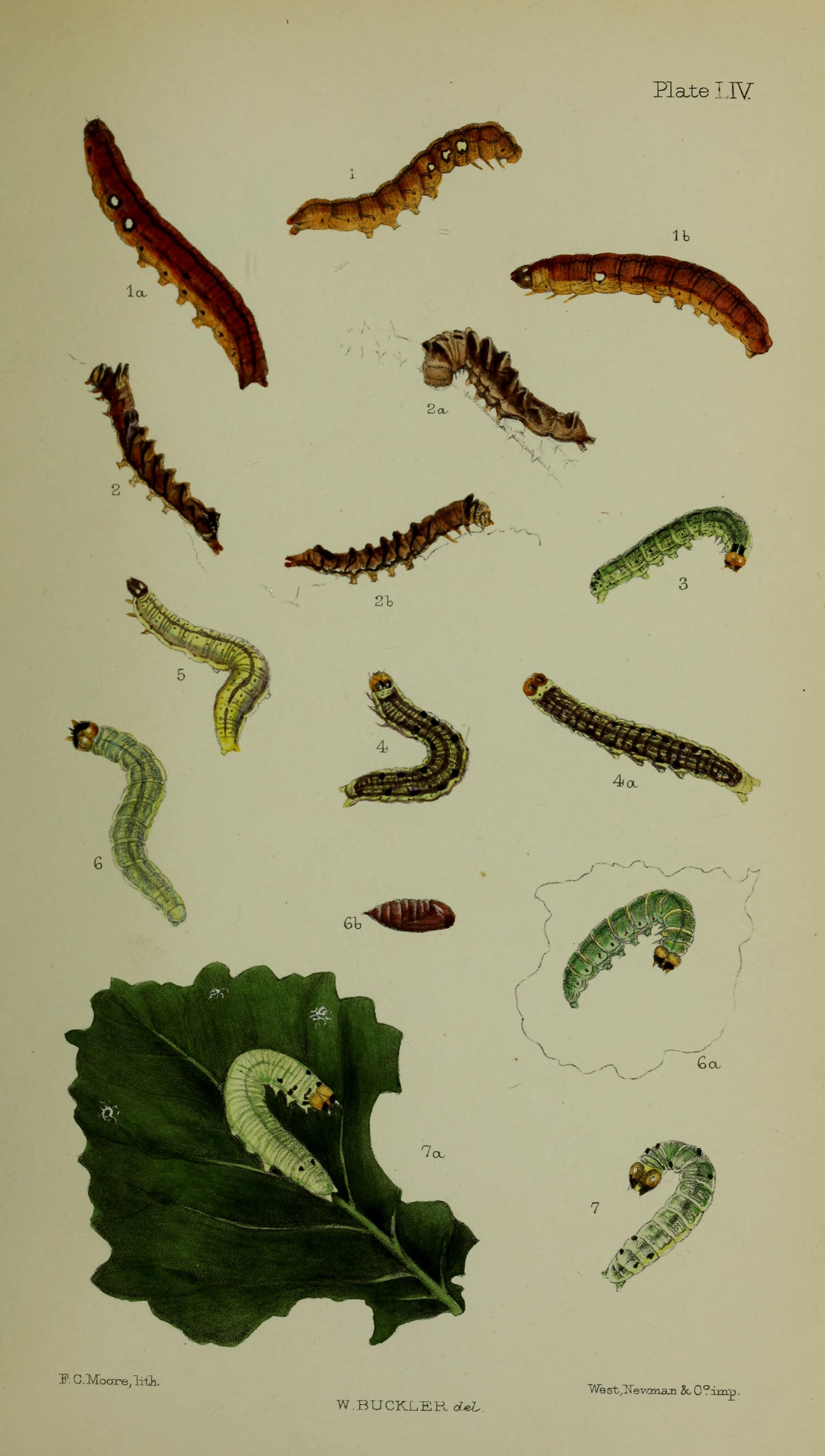
Fig. 5 larvae after final moult

The larvae feed on the leaves of oak trees.
