= Gaurena =

Scientific classification
- Domain: Eukaryota
- Kingdom: Animalia
- Phylum: Arthropoda
- Class: Insecta
- Order: Lepidoptera
- Family: Drepanidae
- Subfamily: Thyatirinae
- Genus: Gaurena; Walker, 1865

Synonyms
- Chlorogaurena Houlbert, 1921; Cyclogaurena Houlbert, 1921; Griseogaurena Houlbert, 1921

Moth genus in family Drepanidae

Gaurena is a genus of moths belonging to the subfamily Thyatirinae of the Drepanidae. It was erected by Francis Walker in 1865.

== Species ==
- Gaurena albifasciata Gaede, 1931
- Gaurena argentisparsa Hampson, 1896
- Gaurena aurofasciata Hampson, 1892
- Gaurena delattini Werny, 1966
- Gaurena florens Walker, 1865
- Gaurena florescens Walker, 1865
- Gaurena forsteri Werny, 1966
- Gaurena gemella Leech, 1900
- Gaurena grisescens Oberthür, 1894
- Gaurena margaritha Werny, 1966
- Gaurena nigrescens Werny, 1966
- Gaurena olivacea Houlbert, 1921
- Gaurena pretiosa Werny, 1966
- Gaurena roesleri Werny, 1966
- Gaurena sinuata Warren, 1912
- Gaurena watsoni Werny, 1966

== Former species ==
- Gaurena dierli Werny, 1966
- Gaurena fletcheri Werny, 1966
