= Sugitaniella =

Scientific classification
- Kingdom: Animalia
- Phylum: Arthropoda
- Clade: Pancrustacea
- Class: Insecta
- Order: Lepidoptera
- Family: Drepanidae
- Subfamily: Thyatirinae
- Genus: Sugitaniella; Matsumura, 1933
- Species: S. kuramana

Binomial name
- Sugitaniella kuramana Matsumura, 1933

Monotypic moth genus in family Drepanidae

Sugitaniella is a genus of moths belonging to the subfamily Thyatirinae of the Drepanidae. It contains only one species, Sugitaniella kuramana, which is found in Japan (Honshu).
