= Wernya karsholti =

Scientific classification
- Kingdom: Animalia
- Phylum: Arthropoda
- Class: Insecta
- Order: Lepidoptera
- Family: Drepanidae
- Genus: Wernya
- Species: W. karsholti

Binomial name
- Wernya karsholti László, G. Ronkay & L. Ronkay, 2001

Species of false owlet moth

Wernya karsholti is a moth in the family Drepanidae. It was described by Gyula M. László, Gábor Ronkay and László Aladár Ronkay in 2001. It is found in Thailand.
