= Wernya punctata =

Scientific classification
- Domain: Eukaryota
- Kingdom: Animalia
- Phylum: Arthropoda
- Class: Insecta
- Order: Lepidoptera
- Family: Drepanidae
- Genus: Wernya
- Species: W. punctata

Binomial name
- Wernya punctata Yoshimoto, 1987

Species of false owlet moth

Wernya punctata is a moth in the family Drepanidae. It was described by Yoshimoto in 1987. It is found on Peninsular Malaysia.
