= Paragnorima fuscescens =

Scientific classification
- Domain: Eukaryota
- Kingdom: Animalia
- Phylum: Arthropoda
- Class: Insecta
- Order: Lepidoptera
- Family: Drepanidae
- Genus: Paragnorima
- Species: P. fuscescens

Binomial name
- Paragnorima fuscescens (Hampson, 1893)

Synonyms
- Gaurena fuscescens Hampson, 1893; Palimpsestis brunnea Leech, 1900; Haplothyatira unipunctata Houlbert, 1921; Haplothyatira unipunctata dubitatrix Bryk, 1943

Species of moth

Paragnorima fuscescens is a moth in the family Drepanidae. It was described by George Hampson in 1893. It is found in India, Nepal, China (Sichuan, Yunnan, Tibet), Vietnam, Thailand and Myanmar.

The wingspan is about 40 mm. The forewings are dull brown suffused with fuscous and with traces of numerous waved dark lines. There is a pale speck below the median nervure near the base and an indistinct dark spot on the discocellulars, as well as a pale patch at the apex. The hindwings are pale fuscous with an indistinct paler band just beyond the middle.
