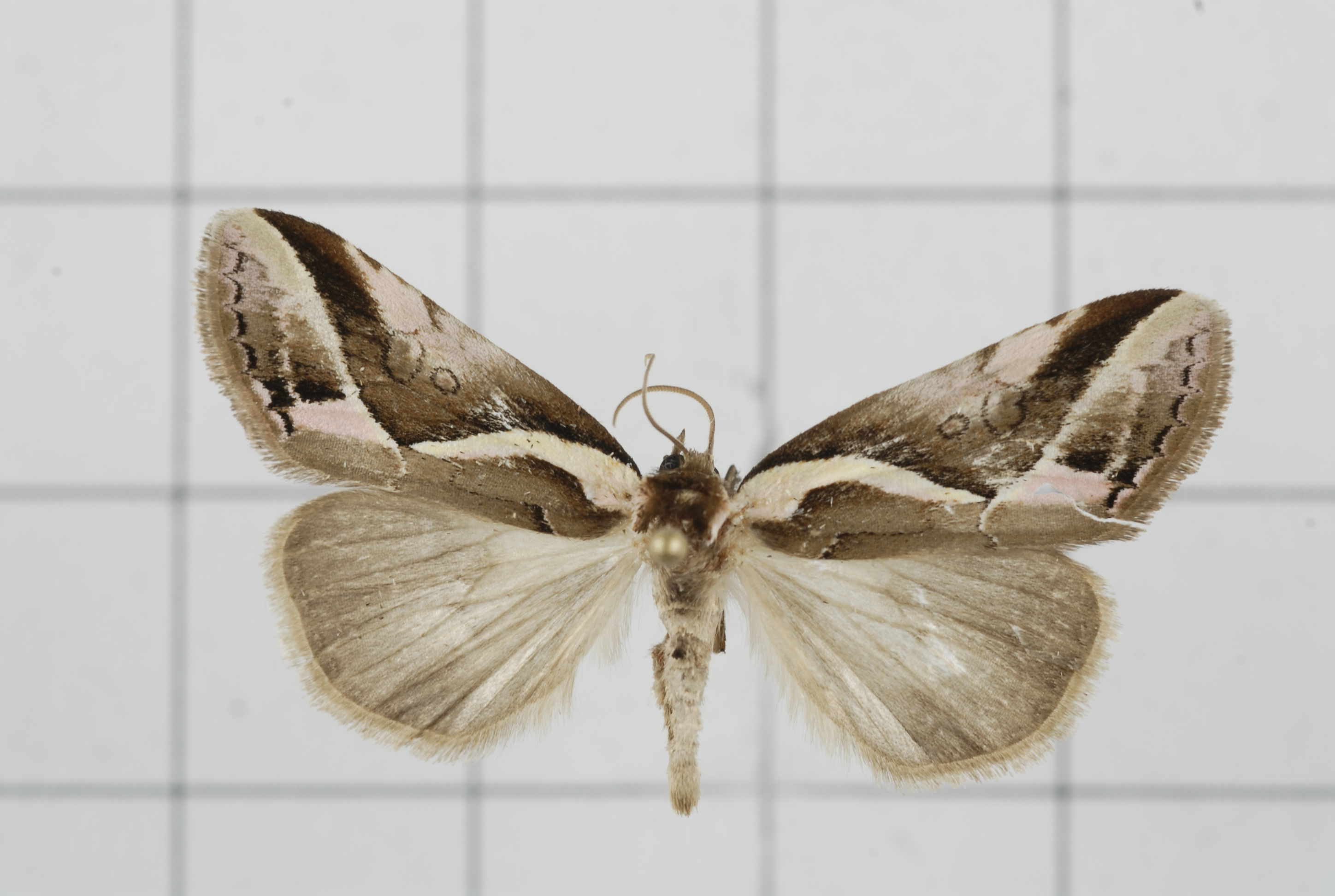

Scientific classification
- Kingdom: Animalia
- Phylum: Arthropoda
- Clade: Pancrustacea
- Class: Insecta
- Order: Lepidoptera
- Family: Drepanidae
- Genus: Psidopala
- Species: P. shirakii

Binomial name
- Psidopala shirakii (Matsumura, 1931)

Synonyms
- Formotogaria shirakii Matsumura, 1931

= Psidopala shirakii =

Species of false owlet moth

Psidopala shirakii is a moth in the family Drepanidae. It was described by Shōnen Matsumura in 1931. It is found in Taiwan.
