= Psidopala opalescens =

Scientific classification
- Domain: Eukaryota
- Kingdom: Animalia
- Phylum: Arthropoda
- Class: Insecta
- Order: Lepidoptera
- Family: Drepanidae
- Genus: Psidopala
- Species: P. opalescens

Binomial name
- Psidopala opalescens (Alphéraky, 1897)

Synonyms
- Thyatira opalescens Alphéraky, 1897

Species of false owlet moth

Psidopala opalescens is a moth in the family Drepanidae. It was described by Sergei Alphéraky in 1897. It is found in Myanmar and the Chinese provinces of Sichuan, Yunnan and Tibet.
