= Wernya lineofracta =

Scientific classification
- Domain: Eukaryota
- Kingdom: Animalia
- Phylum: Arthropoda
- Class: Insecta
- Order: Lepidoptera
- Family: Drepanidae
- Genus: Wernya
- Species: W. lineofracta

Binomial name
- Wernya lineofracta (Houlbert, 1921)

Synonyms
- Palimpsestis lineofracta Houlbert, 1921; Tethea lineofracta Houlbert, 1921

Species of false owlet moth

Wernya lineofracta is a moth in the family Drepanidae. It was described by Constant Vincent Houlbert in 1921. It is found in the Chinese provinces of Hubei, Hunan and Sichuan.

The wingspan is about 44 mm.
