= Marplena =

Scientific classification
- Kingdom: Animalia
- Phylum: Arthropoda
- Class: Insecta
- Order: Lepidoptera
- Family: Drepanidae
- Subfamily: Thyatirinae
- Genus: Marplena; Lane, 1973
- Species: M. designina

Binomial name
- Marplena designina Lane, 1973

Monotypic moth genus in family Drepanidae

Marplena designina is a moth in the family Drepanidae and the only species in the genus Marplena. Both species and genus were described by Maureen A. Lane in 1973. It is found in South Africa.
