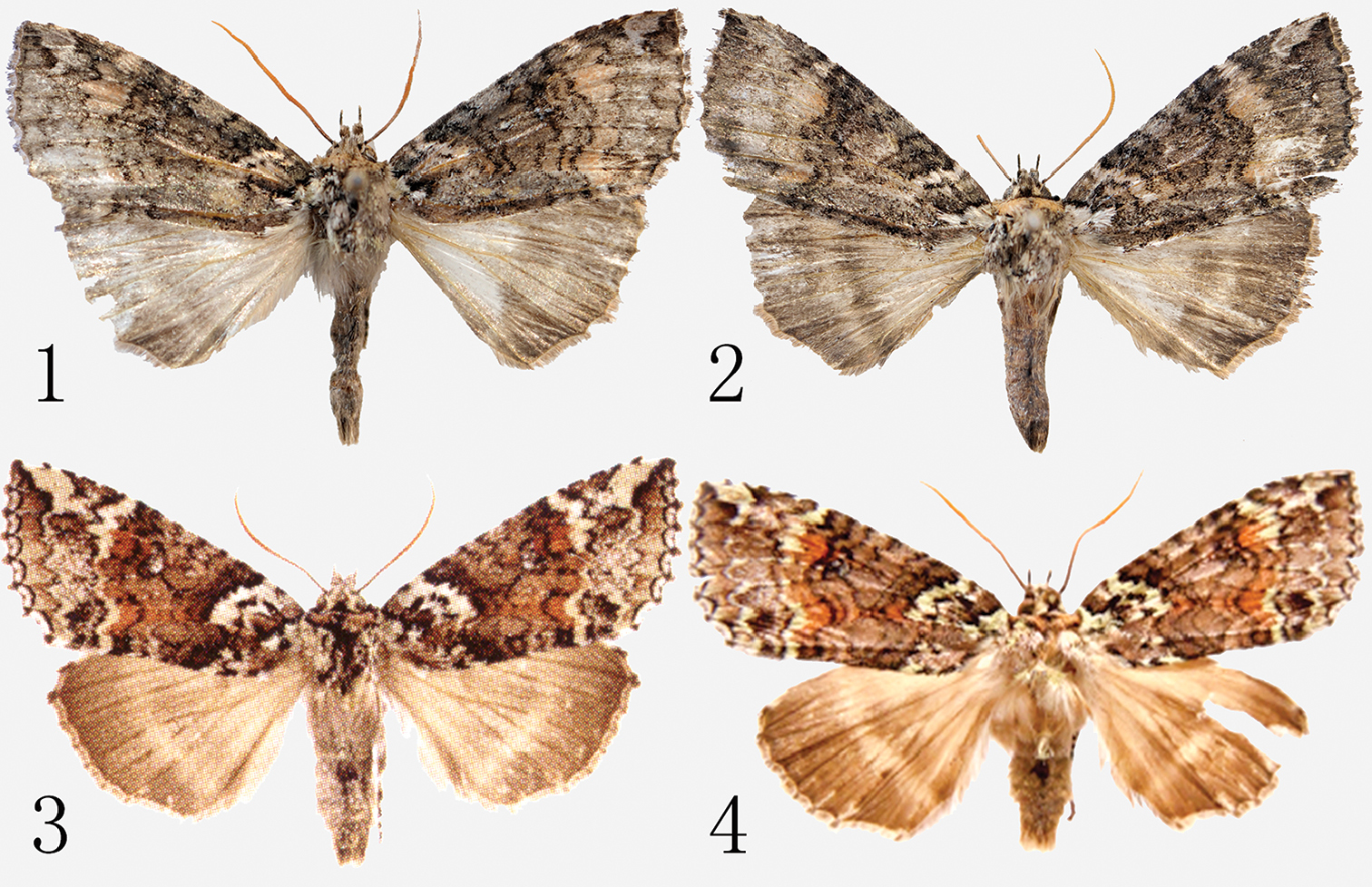
- Male Hiroshia spp.: (1–2) H. shennongjiaensis, (3) H. albinigra, (4) H. nanlingana

Scientific classification
- Kingdom: Animalia
- Phylum: Arthropoda
- Clade: Pancrustacea
- Class: Insecta
- Order: Lepidoptera
- Family: Drepanidae
- Subfamily: Thyatirinae
- Genus: Hiroshia; Laszlo, G. Ronkay & L. Ronkay, 2001

= Hiroshia =

Moth genus in family Drepanidae

Hiroshia is a genus of moths belonging to the subfamily Thyatirinae of the Drepanidae, or alternatively, family Thyatiridae.

== Species ==
There are three accepted species:

- Hiroshia albinigra László, Ronkay & Ronkay, 2001
- Hiroshia nanlingana Zhuang, Owada & Wang, 2014
- Hiroshia shennongjiaensis Ronkay, Ronkay & Han, 2020
