= Mesothyatira =

Scientific classification
- Kingdom: Animalia
- Phylum: Arthropoda
- Class: Insecta
- Order: Lepidoptera
- Family: Drepanidae
- Subfamily: Thyatirinae
- Genus: Mesothyatira; Werny, 1966
- Species: M. simplificata

Binomial name
- Mesothyatira simplificata (Houlbert, 1921)

Synonyms
- Melanocraspes simplificata Houlbert, 1921

Monotypic moth genus in family Drepanidae

Mesothyatira is a monotypic moth genus in the family Drepanidae described by Werny in 1966. Its only species, Mesothyatira simplificata, was described by Constant Vincent Houlbert in 1921. It is found in the Chinese provinces of Shaanxi, Sichuan and Yunnan.
