= Gaurena watsoni =

Scientific classification
- Domain: Eukaryota
- Kingdom: Animalia
- Phylum: Arthropoda
- Class: Insecta
- Order: Lepidoptera
- Family: Drepanidae
- Genus: Gaurena
- Species: G. watsoni

Binomial name
- Gaurena watsoni Werny, 1966

Species of false owlet moth

Gaurena watsoni is a moth in the family Drepanidae. It is found in the Chinese provinces of Sichuan and Yunnan and in Vietnam.
