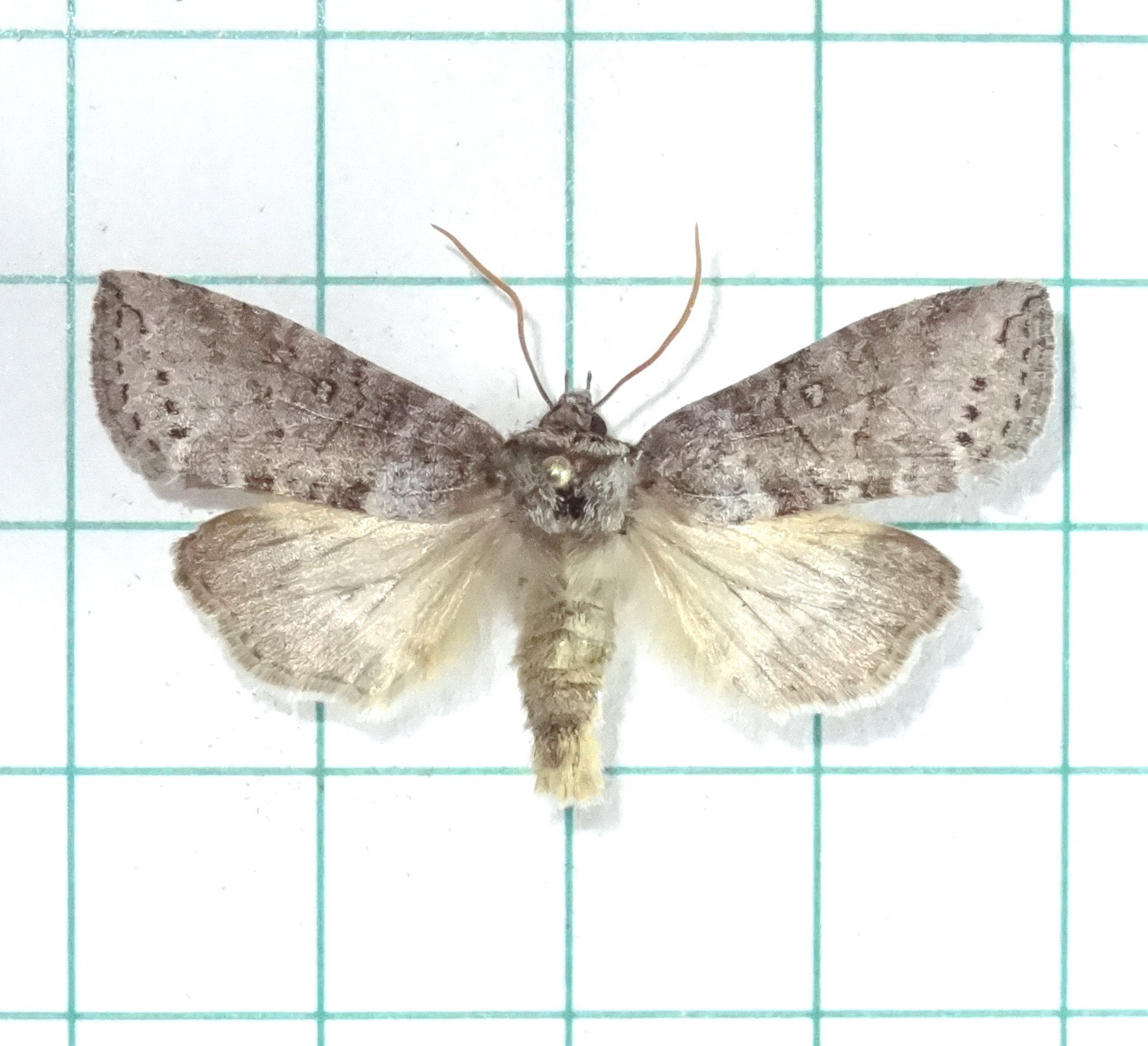
- Demopsestis formosana

Scientific classification
- Kingdom: Animalia
- Phylum: Arthropoda
- Clade: Pancrustacea
- Class: Insecta
- Order: Lepidoptera
- Family: Drepanidae
- Subfamily: Thyatirinae
- Genus: Demopsestis; Matsumura, 1927

= Demopsestis =

Moth genus in family Drepanidae

Demopsestis is a genus of moths belonging to the subfamily Thyatirinae.

== Species ==
There are four accepted species:

- Demopsestis formosana Yoshimoto, 1983
- Demopsestis mahendrai Yoshimoto, 1993
- Demopsestis punctigera (Butler, 1885)
- Demopsestis yoshimotoi Laszlo, G.Ronkay, L.Ronkay & Witt, 2007
