= Neoploca =

Scientific classification
- Kingdom: Animalia
- Phylum: Arthropoda
- Class: Insecta
- Order: Lepidoptera
- Family: Drepanidae
- Subfamily: Thyatirinae
- Genus: Neoploca; Matsumura, 1927
- Species: N. arctipennis

Binomial name
- Neoploca arctipennis (Butler, 1878)

Synonyms
- Xylina arctipennis Butler, 1878; Asphalia nigrofascicula Graesser, 1888; Polyploca arctipennis ab. innotata Warren, in Seitz 1912; Neoploca misaona Matsumura, 1933

Monotypic moth genus in family Drepanidae

Neoploca is a genus of moths belonging to the subfamily Thyatirinae of the Drepanidae. It was first described by Shōnen Matsumura in 1927. It contains only one species, Neoploca arctipennis, first described by Arthur Gardiner Butler in 1878, which is found in Japan, Korea, the Russian Far East and China (Jilin, Inner Mongolia, Shaanxi, Jiangsu).

The wingspan is 35–38 mm. The forewings are silvery grey, the base, a central irregular black edged band, a transverse discal stripe and the outer border are rather paler and greyer than the rest of the wing. There is a black dot at the interior angle of the cell, a disco-submarginal series, a series of marginal black lunules and a short oblique black apical line. The hindwings are shining sordid white, with a broad, pale brown external border.

The larvae feed on Quercus mongolica.
