= Gaurena sinuata =

Scientific classification
- Domain: Eukaryota
- Kingdom: Animalia
- Phylum: Arthropoda
- Class: Insecta
- Order: Lepidoptera
- Family: Drepanidae
- Genus: Gaurena
- Species: G. sinuata

Binomial name
- Gaurena sinuata Warren, 1912

Synonyms
- Gaurena dierli Werny, 1966; Gaurena fletcheri Werny, 1966

Species of false owlet moth

Gaurena sinuata is a moth in the family Drepanidae. It is found in Nepal and China (Sichuan, Shaanxi, Gansu, Yunnan, Tibet).

== Subspecies ==
- Gaurena sinuata sinuata (China: Sichuan, Yunnan)
- Gaurena sinuata dierli Werny, 1966 (Nepal, China: Tibet)
- Gaurena sinuata fletcheri Werny, 1966 (China: Shaanxi, Gansu)
