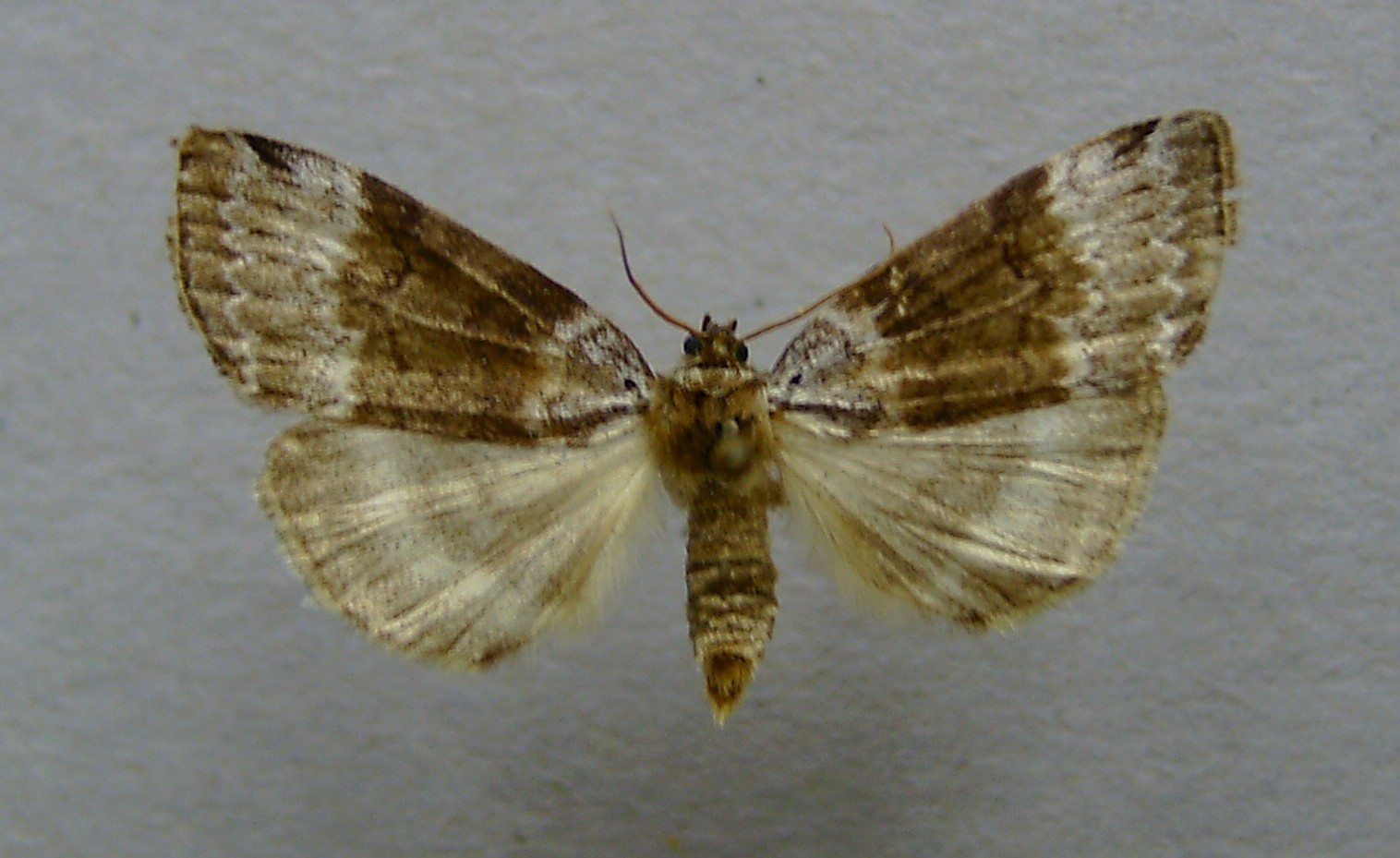

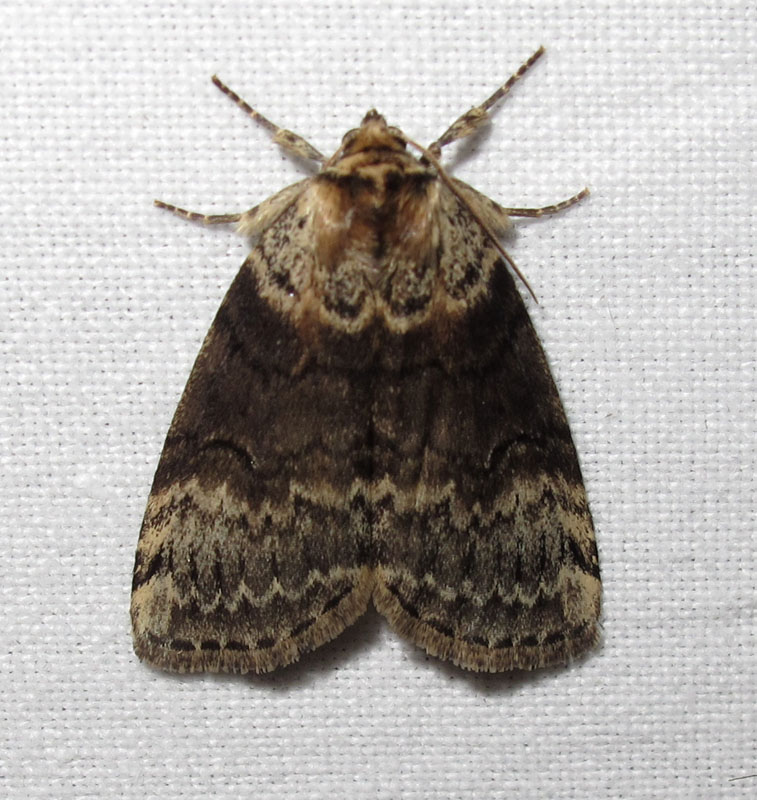

Scientific classification
- Kingdom: Animalia
- Phylum: Arthropoda
- Clade: Pancrustacea
- Class: Insecta
- Order: Lepidoptera
- Family: Drepanidae
- Subfamily: Thyatirinae
- Genus: Tetheella
- Species: T. fluctuosa

Binomial name
- Tetheella fluctuosa (Hübner, 1803)

Synonyms
- Noctua fluctuosa Hübner, [1803]; Palimpsestis fluctuosa isshikii Matsumura, 1921; Palimpsestis hirayami Matsumura, 1933

= Tetheella =

Monotypic moth genus in family Drepanidae

Tetheella is a monotypic moth genus in the family Drepanidae described by Werny in 1966. Its single species, Tetheella fluctuosa, the satin lutestring, was described by Jacob Hübner in 1803. It is found from western Europe across the Palearctic to Kamchatka, Sakhalin Island, Korea and Japan.

The wingspan is 35–38 mm. The forewings are light fuscous, white- sprinkled. The first line is whitish, limiting a broad darker central band including dark fuscous median and second lines, followed by a whitish dark-edged waved line. The subterminal is whitish, waved, preceded on the costa by an oblique dark fuscous dash. The hindwings are grey, with a pale postmedian line. The larva is yellow whitish; dorsal, fine subdorsal, and lateral lines fuscous; head reddish-ochreous, brown-marked.

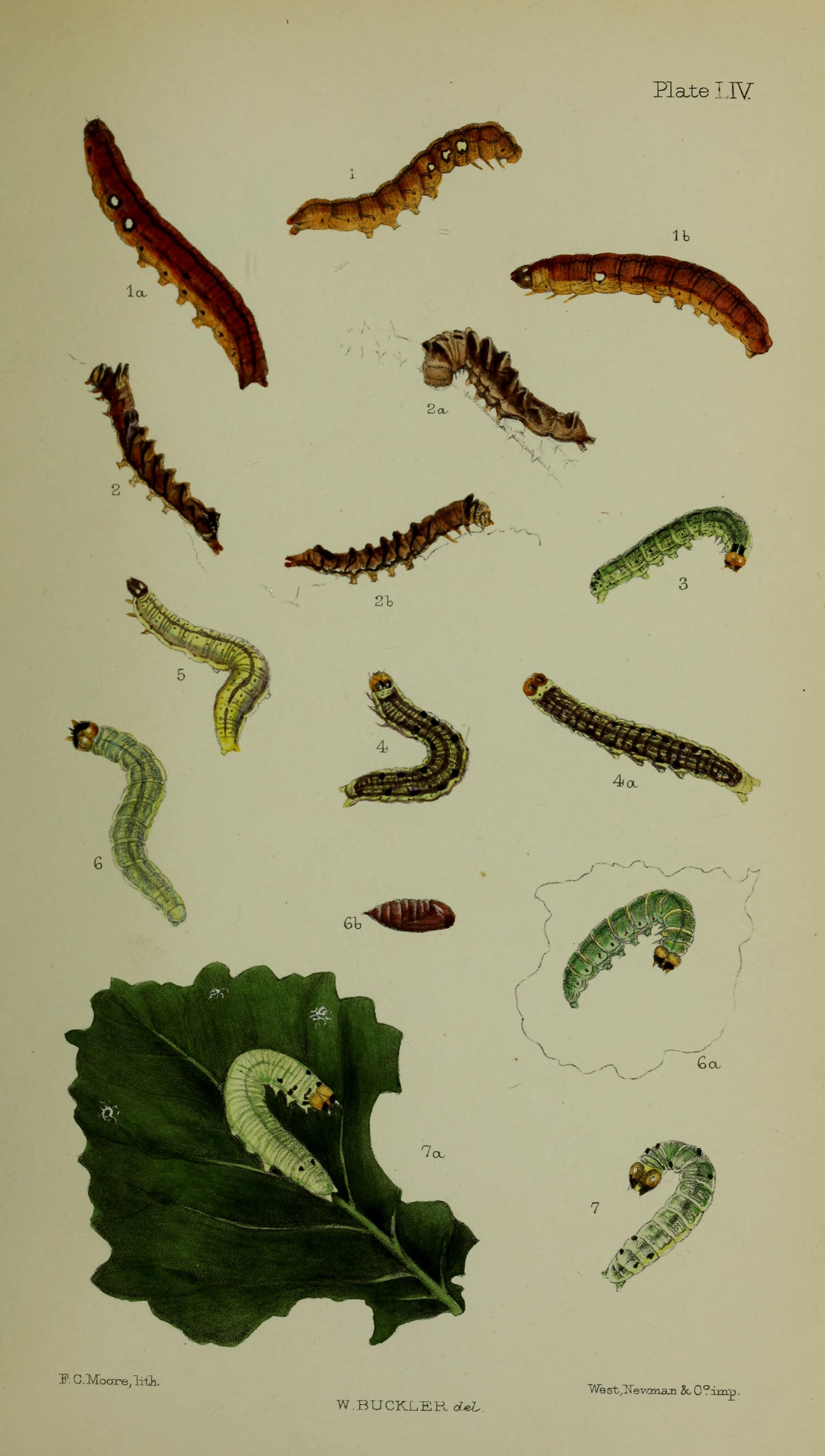
Figs 4, 4a larvae after final moult

The moth flies from June to August depending on the location.

The larvae feed on birch and alder.

== Subspecies ==
- Tetheella fluctuosa fluctuosa
- Tetheella fluctuosa isshikii (Matsumura, 1921) (Russian Far East, north-eastern and northern China, Korea, Japan)
