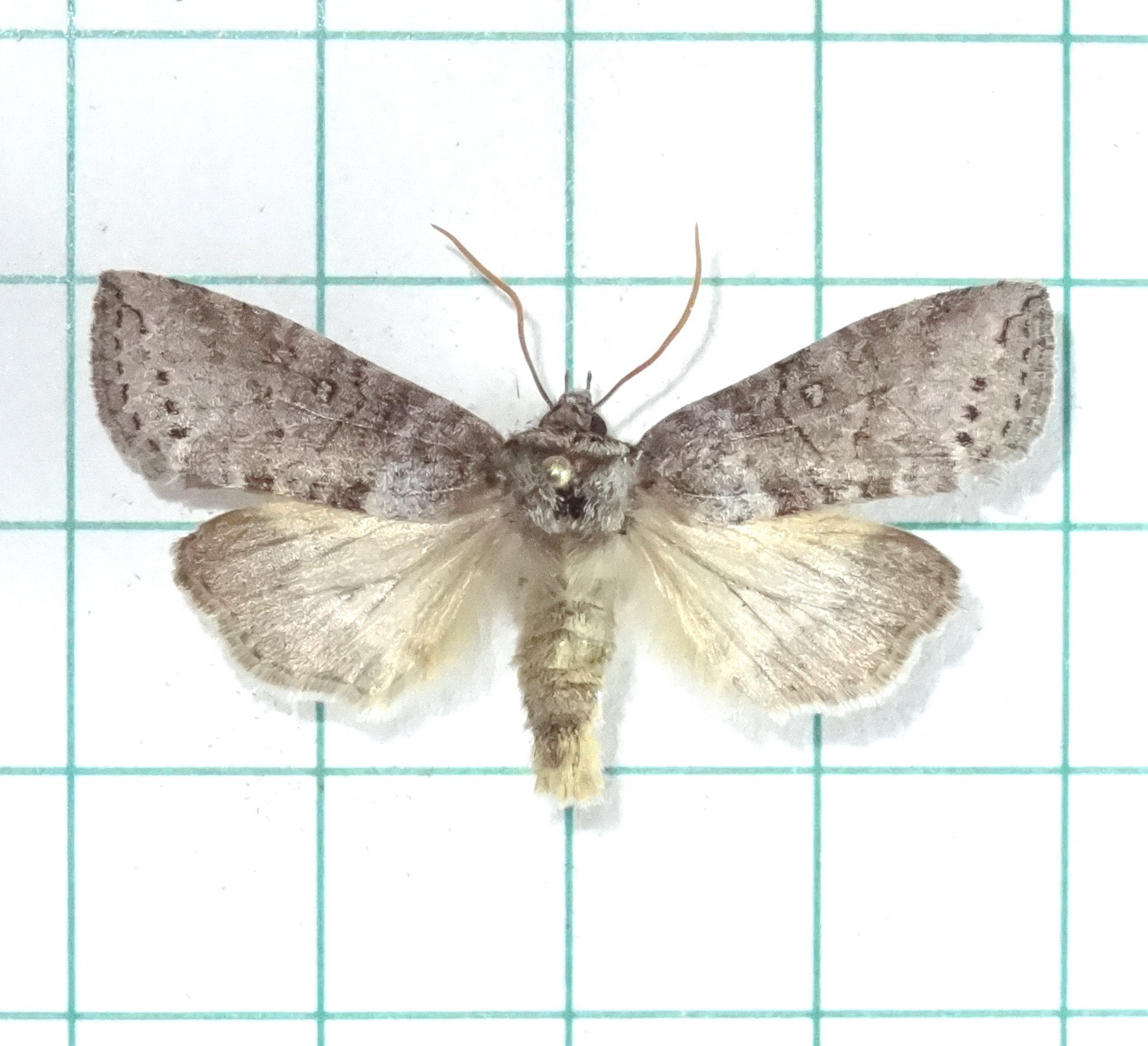

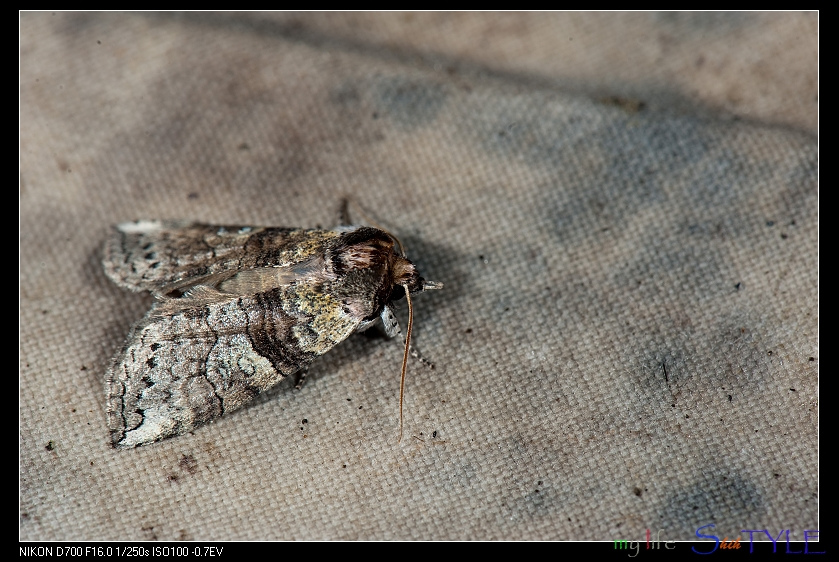

Scientific classification
- Kingdom: Animalia
- Phylum: Arthropoda
- Clade: Pancrustacea
- Class: Insecta
- Order: Lepidoptera
- Family: Drepanidae
- Genus: Demopsestis
- Species: D. formosana

Binomial name
- Demopsestis formosana Yoshimoto, 1983

= Demopsestis formosana =

Species of false owlet moth

Demopsestis formosana is a moth in the family Drepanidae. It is endemic to Taiwan. The type series was collected from mountain areas at elevations of 2,200–2,600 m (7,200–8,500 ft). It seems to be univoltine, with adults flying in spring.

The wingspan is 36–39 mm (1.4–1.5 in).
