= Kurama (moth) =

Scientific classification
- Kingdom: Animalia
- Phylum: Arthropoda
- Clade: Pancrustacea
- Class: Insecta
- Order: Lepidoptera
- Family: Drepanidae
- Genus: Kurama; Matsumura, 1921

Moth genus in family Drepanidae

Kurama is a genus of moths belonging to the subfamily Thyatirinae of the Drepanidae.

== Species ==
- Kurama mirabilis Butler, 1879

== Former species ==
- Kurama galbanus Tutt, 1891
