= Gaurena florens =

Scientific classification
- Kingdom: Animalia
- Phylum: Arthropoda
- Class: Insecta
- Order: Lepidoptera
- Family: Drepanidae
- Genus: Gaurena
- Species: G. florens

Binomial name
- Gaurena florens Walker, 1865

Synonyms
- Gaurena florens oliva Werny, 1966; Gaurena florens obscura Werny, 1966; Gaurena florens yuennanensis Werny, 1966

Species of false owlet moth

Gaurena florens is a moth in the family Drepanidae. It is found in Nepal, India (Darjeeling, Sikkim), Myanmar, China (Gansu, Guangxi, Sichuan, Yunnan, Tibet), Bhutan, Vietnam and Thailand.

The wingspan is about 40 mm. The forewings are olive brown suffused with yellow, the markings pale yellow and white. There is a spot near the base and a subbasal waved band, as well as a spot in the cell and a larger spot at the end of it. There is also a postmedial patch on the costa, another at the apex and one at the outer angle. There is also a submarginal and marginal series of lunulate spots and the costa and veins 1 and 2 are spotted with yellow.
