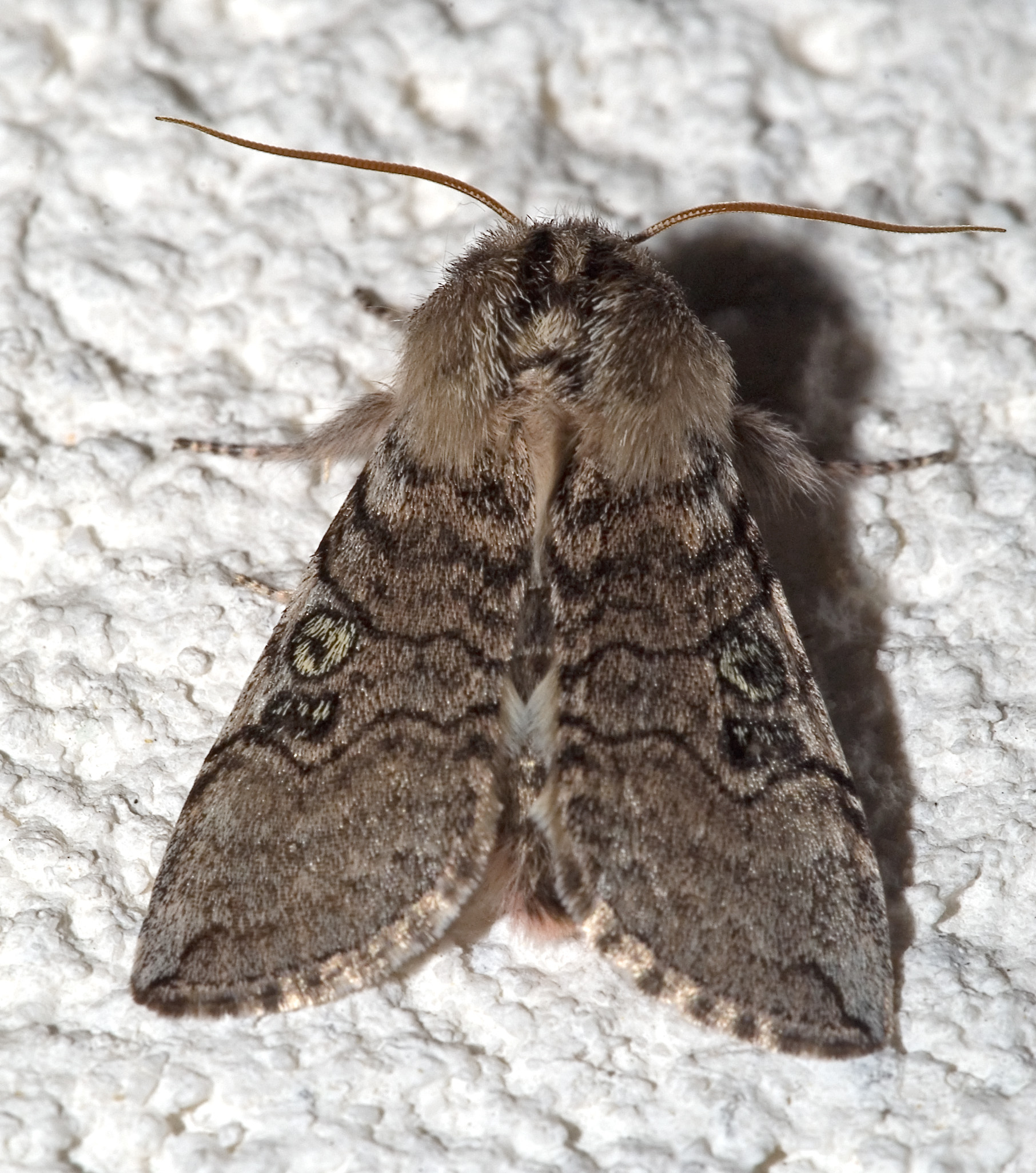
- Achlya flavicornis

Scientific classification
- Domain: Eukaryota
- Kingdom: Animalia
- Phylum: Arthropoda
- Class: Insecta
- Order: Lepidoptera
- Family: Drepanidae
- Subfamily: Thyatirinae; Smith, 1893

Synonyms
- Cymatophoridae Herrich-Schäffer, 1847

= Thyatirinae =

Hook-tip moth subfamily comprising the false owlets

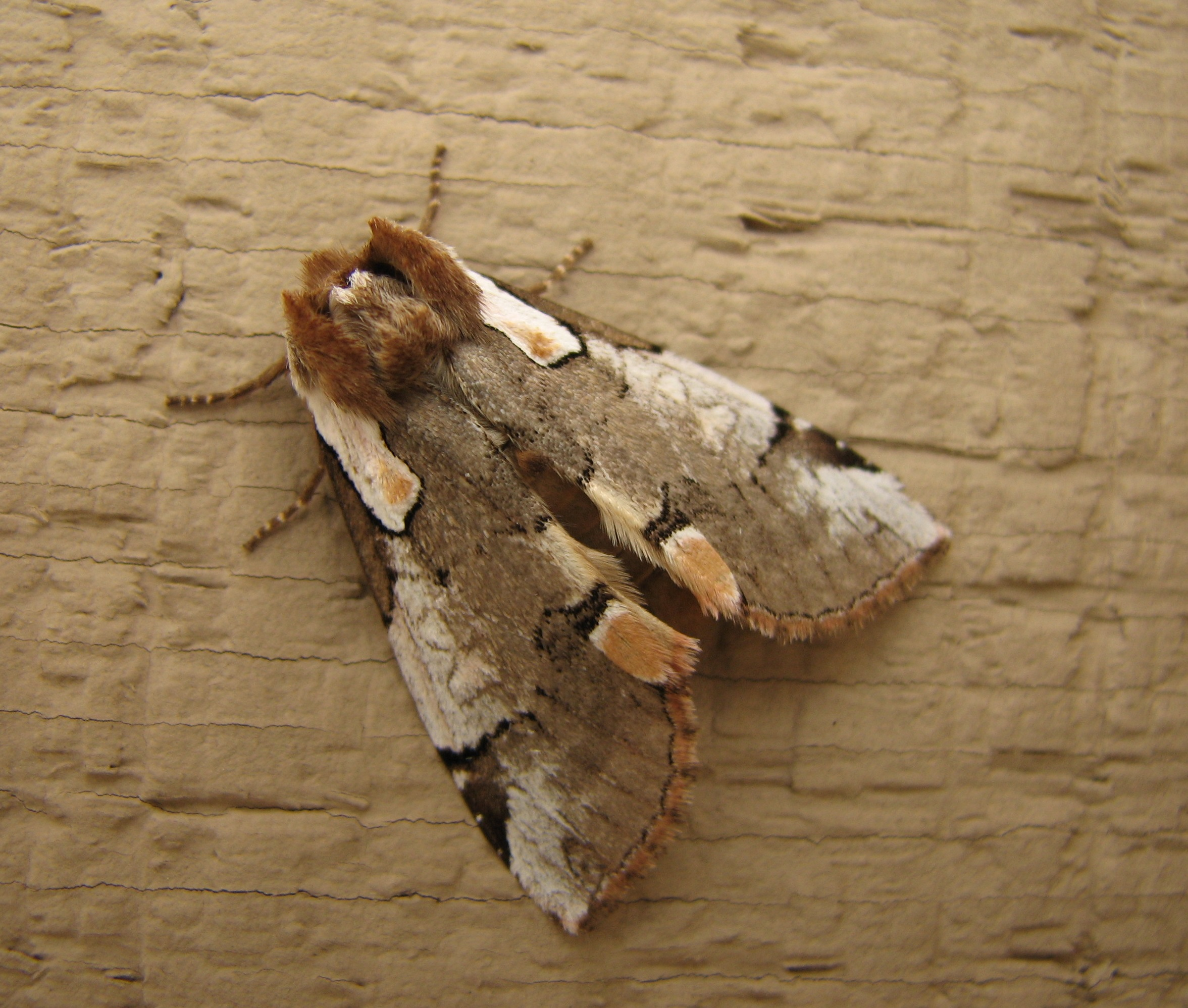
Euthyatira lorata

The Thyatirinae, or false owlet moths, are a subfamily of the moth family Drepanidae with about 200 species described. Until recently, most classifications treated this group as a separate family called Thyatiridae.

== Taxonomy ==
- Aethiopsestis
- Achlya
- Betapsestis
- Bycombia
- Camptopsestis
- Ceranemota
- Chaeopsestis
- Chiropsestis
- Cymatophorina
- Demopsestis
- Epipsestis
- Euparyphasma
- Euthyatira
- Gaurena
- Habrona
- Habrosyne
- Hiroshia
- Horipsestis
- Horithyatira
- Hypsidia
- Isopsestis
- Koedfoltos
- Kurama
- Macrothyatira
- Marplena
- Mesopsestis
- Mesothyatira
- Mimopsestis
- Nemacerota
- Neodaruma
- Neoploca
- Nephoploca
- Neotogaria
- Nothoploca
- Ochropacha
- Paragnorima
- Parapsestis
- Polydactylos
- Polyploca
- Psidopala
- Pseudothyatira
- Shinploca
- Spica
- Stenopsestis
- Sugitaniella
- Takapsestis
- Tethea
- Tetheella
- Thyatira
- Toelgyfaloca
- Toxoides
- Wernya
