= List of drepanid genera =

Partial list of moth genera

The moth family Drepanidae contains the following genera:

== A ==
- Achlya
- Aethiopsestis
- Agnidra - includes Zanclalbara
- Albara
- Amphitorna - includes Neoreta, Procampsis, Tomocerota
- Archidrepana
- Argodrepana
- Asphalia
- Astatochroa
- Auzata - includes Gonocilix
- Auzatella
- Auzatellodes

== B ==
- Baipsestis
- Betapsestis
- Bycombia

== C ==
- Callicilix
- Callidrepana - includes Ausaris, Damna, Drepanulides, Drepanulina, Ticilia
- Camptopsestis
- Canucha - includes Campylopteryx
- Ceranemota
- Chaeopsestis
- Cilix
- Crocinis
- Crucidava
- Cyclidia
- Cyclogaurena
- Cymatophorima
- Cymotrix

== D ==
- Darumona
- Demopsestis
- Deroca
- Didymana
- Dipriodonta
- Ditrigona - includes Leucodrepana, Leucodrepanilla
- Drapetodes
- Drepana

== E ==
- Epicampoptera
- Epipsestis
- Eudeilinia
- Euparyphasma
- Euphalacra - includes Ectothyris, Neophalacra
- Euthyatira - includes Persiscota

== F ==
- Falcaria - includes Edapteryx
- Formotogaria

== G ==
- Gaurena
- Gogana - includes Ametroptila, Liocrops, Trotothyris
- Gonoreta
- Gonoretodes
- Griseogaurena

== H ==
- Habrona
- Habrosyne - includes Cymatochrocis, Habrosynula, Hannya, Miothyatira
- Haloplia
- Haplothyatira
- Hemictenarcha
- Hemiphruda
- Horipsestis
- Horithyatira
- Hyalospectra
- Hyalostola
- Hypsidia - includes Baryphanes, Eggersops

== I ==
- Isopsestis
- Isospidia

== K ==
- Kosemponiola
- Kurama

== L ==
- Leucoblepsis
- Lomadontophana

== M ==
- Macrauzata
- Macrocilix
- Macrothyatira
- Marplena
- Melanocraspes
- Mesopsestis
- Mesothyatira
- Metadrepana
- Microblepsis - includes Betalbara
- Microthytira
- Mimopsestis
- Mimozethes
- Monoprista
- Monothyatira

== N ==
- Negera
- Nelcynda
- Nemacerota
- Neochropacha
- Neodaruma
- Neoploca
- Neopsestis
- Neotogaria
- Nephoploca
- Nidara
- Nordstromia - includes Allodrepana
- Nothoploca

== O ==
- Ochropacha
- Oreta - includes Dryopteris, Holoreta, Hypsomadius, Mimoreta, Oretella, Psiloreta, Rhamphoreta
- Oretopsis

== P ==
- Paragnorima
- Paralbara
- Parapsestis
- Peridrepana
- Phalacra
- Phalacrothyris
- Pithania
- Plusinia
- Polydactylos
- Polyploca - includes Parmelina
- Problepsidis
- Pseudalbara
- Pseudemodesa
- Pseuderosia
- Pseudothyatira
- Psidopala
- Psidopaloides

== S ==
- Sabra
- Scytalopteryx
- Sewa
- Shinploca
- Spectroreta
- Spica
- Spidia
- Stenopsestis
- Strepsigonia - includes Monurodes
- Streptoperas
- Sugiploca
- Sugitaniella
- Suzupsestis

== T ==
- Takapsestis - includes Neogaurena
- Teldenia
- Tethea - includes Episaronaga, Palimpsestis, Saronaga
- Tetheella
- Thaleridia
- Thyatira
- Thymistadopsis
- Thymistida - includes Hybodrepana, Thymistada
- Togaria
- Toxoides
- Tridrepana - includes Konjikia

== U ==
- Uranometra
- Urogonodes

== W ==
- Watsonalla
- Wernya

== Y ==
- Yucilix

== Z ==
- Zusidava - includes Emodesa
