= Streptoperas crenelata =

Scientific classification
- Domain: Eukaryota
- Kingdom: Animalia
- Phylum: Arthropoda
- Class: Insecta
- Order: Lepidoptera
- Family: Drepanidae
- Genus: Streptoperas
- Species: S. crenelata

Binomial name
- Streptoperas crenelata C. Swinhoe, 1902

Species of hook-tip moth

Streptoperas crenelata is a moth in the family Drepanidae. It was described by Charles Swinhoe in 1902. It is found on Borneo and Peninsular Malaysia.

The wingspan is about 44 mm. Adults are similar to Streptoperas luteata, but there is no white mark at the forewing apex and the outer margin of the hindwings is strongly crenulated (scalloped) and produced to a point at vein 6, there are also two points close together at the production of the wing below the middle of the margin. There is a double postmedial line with yellow spots on its outer edge, especially towards the abdominal margin. The outer area is rufous and there is a submarginal dentate line with dark marks on it.
