= Zusidava sinuosa =

Scientific classification
- Domain: Eukaryota
- Kingdom: Animalia
- Phylum: Arthropoda
- Class: Insecta
- Order: Lepidoptera
- Family: Drepanidae
- Genus: Zusidava
- Species: Z. sinuosa

Binomial name
- Zusidava sinuosa (Moore, 1888)

Synonyms
- Emodesa sinuosa Moore, 1888

Species of hook-tip moth

Zusidava sinuosa is a moth in the family Drepanidae. It was described by Frederic Moore in 1888. It is found in the Khasi Hills of India. The Global Lepidoptera Names Index has this name as a synonym of Zusidava tortricaria.
