= Paralbara spicula =

Scientific classification
- Domain: Eukaryota
- Kingdom: Animalia
- Phylum: Arthropoda
- Class: Insecta
- Order: Lepidoptera
- Family: Drepanidae
- Genus: Paralbara
- Species: P. spicula

Binomial name
- Paralbara spicula Watson, 1968

Species of hook-tip moth

Paralbara spicula is a moth in the family Drepanidae. It was described by Watson in 1968. It is found in Guangdong, China.

The length of the forewings is 14.5–17 mm. Adults are similar to Paralbara perhamata, but can be distinguished by the male and female genitalia.
