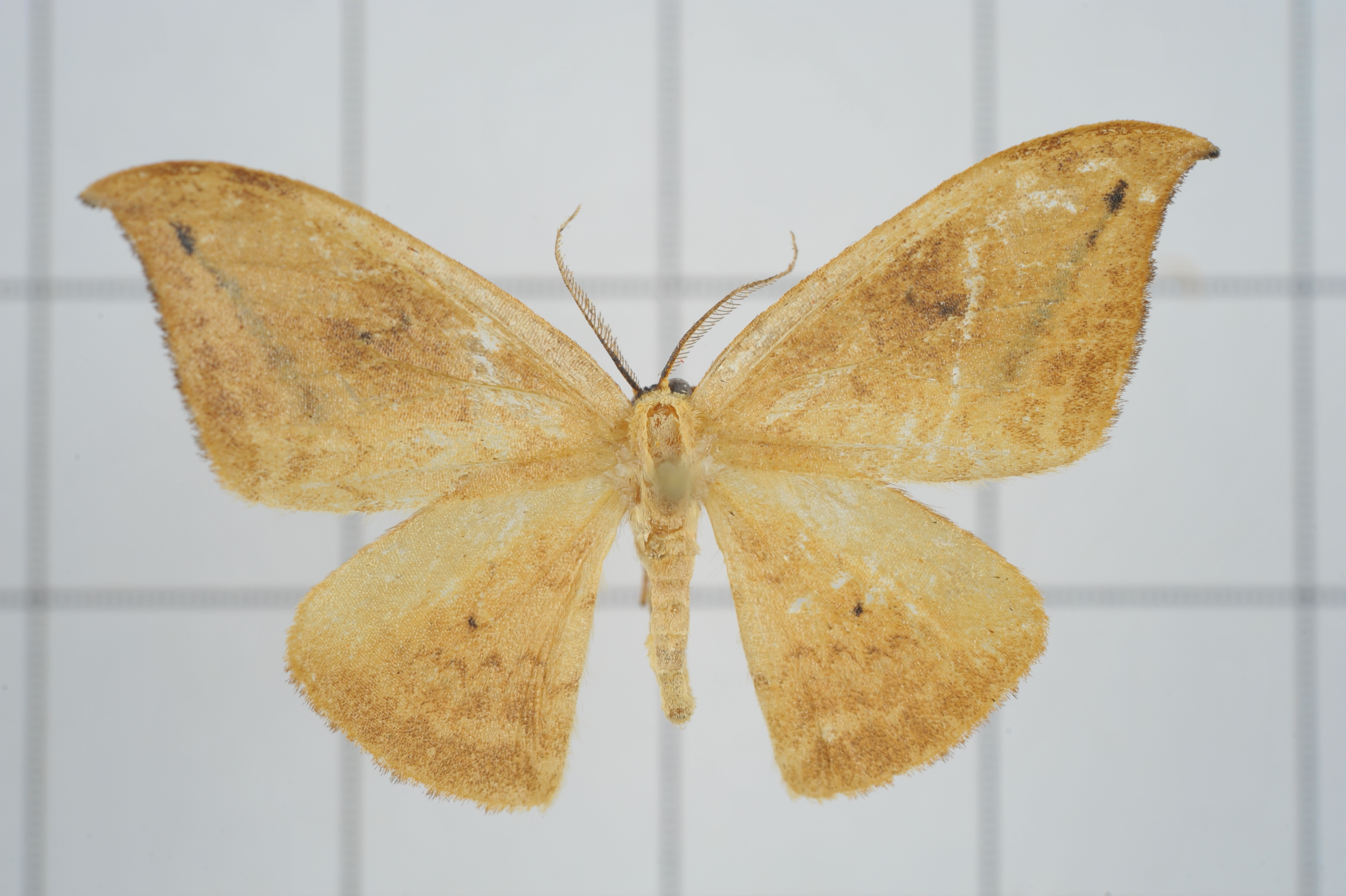

Scientific classification
- Domain: Eukaryota
- Kingdom: Animalia
- Phylum: Arthropoda
- Class: Insecta
- Order: Lepidoptera
- Family: Drepanidae
- Genus: Strepsigonia
- Species: S. diluta

Binomial name
- Strepsigonia diluta (Warren, 1897)

Synonyms
- Tridrepana diluta Warren, 1897; Tridrepana subobliqua Warren, 1897; Callidrepana takumukui Matsumura, 1927; Strepsigonia diluta fujiena Chu & Wang, 1987

= Strepsigonia diluta =

Species of hook-tip moth

Strepsigonia diluta is a moth in the family Drepanidae. It is found in the north-eastern Himalaya, China, Taiwan, Java, Sumatra, Peninsular Malaysia, Borneo and Seram.

The wingspan is 27–28 mm (1.06–1.10 in).

The larvae feed on the leaves of Engelhardia roxburgiana.

== Subspecies ==
- Strepsigonia diluta diluta
- Strepsigonia diluta takamukui (Matsumura, 1927) (Taiwan)
