= Habrona brunnea =

Scientific classification
- Domain: Eukaryota
- Kingdom: Animalia
- Phylum: Arthropoda
- Class: Insecta
- Order: Lepidoptera
- Family: Drepanidae
- Genus: Habrona
- Species: H. brunnea

Binomial name
- Habrona brunnea Bethune-Baker, 1908

Synonyms
- Cymotrix decora Gaede, 1930; Cymotrix decora f. indecora Gaede, 1930

Species of false owlet moth

Habrona brunnea is a moth in the family Drepanidae. It is found in New Guinea and on the Moluccas. The habitat consists of mountainous areas.

The wingspan is 50–54 mm. The forewings are rich sepia-brown, with a pale chestnut basal line strongly angled in the fold. There is a trace of a very short similar line at the extreme base, a trace of twin dark median lines somewhat angled outwardly and a series of four finely waved outwardly angled postmedian lines. There is also a paler brown wedge-shaped apical patch and a pale chestnut or creamy patch at the tornus, intersected with a tridentate short dash. The termen has paler darkly edged dashes and there are two dark spots in the cells. The hindwings are ochreous grey and pale at the base.
