= Thymistida nigritincta =

Scientific classification
- Domain: Eukaryota
- Kingdom: Animalia
- Phylum: Arthropoda
- Class: Insecta
- Order: Lepidoptera
- Family: Drepanidae
- Genus: Thymistida
- Species: T. nigritincta

Binomial name
- Thymistida nigritincta Warren, 1923

Synonyms
- Thymistida rufa Warren, 1923; Hybodrepana grotesca Bryk, 1943

Species of hook-tip moth

Thymistida nigritincta is a moth in the family Drepanidae. It was described by Warren in 1923. It is found in north-eastern India and northern Myanmar.
