= Habrona caerulescens =

Scientific classification
- Kingdom: Animalia
- Phylum: Arthropoda
- Clade: Pancrustacea
- Class: Insecta
- Order: Lepidoptera
- Family: Drepanidae
- Genus: Habrona
- Species: H. caerulescens

Binomial name
- Habrona caerulescens Warren, 1915

Species of false owlet moth

Habrona caerulescens is a moth in the family Drepanidae. It is found in New Guinea, where it has been recorded only from the Star Mountains.

The wingspan is about 50 mm (2.0 in). The forewings are dark olive-fuscous, the median area crossed by five blackish waved lines angled at the middle, of which the median is thickest. The other lines are bluish white, the subbasal line indicated by diffuse scales in the basal area and the inner line waved, oblique to the submedian fold, then inbent, more diffuse and partially double above the middle. The outer line is obscurely lunulate-dentate, outwardly oblique, bent below vein 4 and inangled on veins 1 and more distinctly double above the middle. The subterminal line has a zigzag course from the costa to vein 6, forming the inner edge of a slightly paler apical blotch, then interrupted, and again forming a slight angular mark on vein 2 beyond the outer line. The stigmata is marked by bluish-white dots and there is a row of bluish-white dashes before the termen. The hindwings are fuscous, the base and inner margin ochreous.
