= Nidara multiversa =

Scientific classification
- Kingdom: Animalia
- Phylum: Arthropoda
- Clade: Pancrustacea
- Class: Insecta
- Order: Lepidoptera
- Family: Drepanidae
- Genus: Nidara
- Species: N. multiversa

Binomial name
- Nidara multiversa Watson, 1965

Species of hook-tip moth

Nidara multiversa is a moth in the family Drepanidae. It was described by Watson in 1965. It is found in Madagascar.
