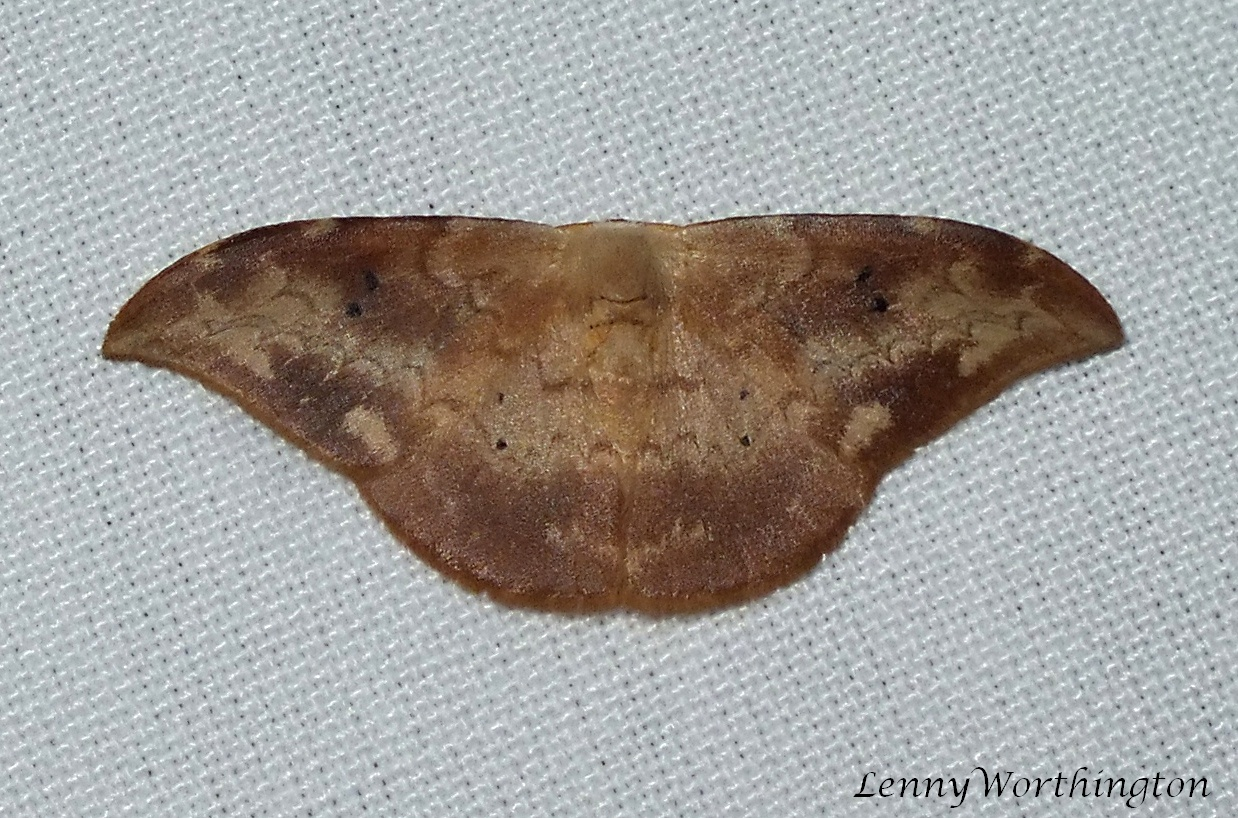

Scientific classification
- Kingdom: Animalia
- Phylum: Arthropoda
- Class: Insecta
- Order: Lepidoptera
- Family: Drepanidae
- Genus: Strepsigonia
- Species: S. quadripunctata

Binomial name
- Strepsigonia quadripunctata (Walker, 1862)

Synonyms
- Drepana quadripunctata Walker, 1862

= Strepsigonia quadripunctata =

Species of hook-tip moth

Strepsigonia quadripunctata is a moth in the family Drepanidae. It was described by Francis Walker in 1862. It is found in Sundaland, the north-eastern Himalayas and on Sulawesi and the southern Moluccas.

Adults are testaceous, the wings with the exterior lunulate and dentate line rather darker than the ground colour. It is most distinct on the forewings where it terminates in a black apical streak. The discal point is black.
