= Astatochroa fuscimargo =

Scientific classification
- Domain: Eukaryota
- Kingdom: Animalia
- Phylum: Arthropoda
- Class: Insecta
- Order: Lepidoptera
- Family: Drepanidae
- Genus: Astatochroa
- Species: A. fuscimargo

Binomial name
- Astatochroa fuscimargo (Warren, 1896)

Synonyms
- Oreta fuscimargo Warren, 1896; Psiloreta fuscimargo; Oreta pusilla Warren, 1900; Oreta roseola Warren, 1900; Psiloreta roseola; Artaxa usta Lucas, 1901; Nygmia usta

Species of hook-tip moth

Astatochroa fuscimargo is a moth in the family Drepanidae. It was described by Warren in 1896. It is found in Australia, where it has been recorded from Queensland.

The wingspan is about 24–30 mm. The forewings are pale yellow with a rufous spot in the cell towards the base, and a rufous cloud before the lower end. There is a fine oblique rufous line from the apex to three-fourths of the inner margin, as well as three wedge-shaped red-brown spots before middle of the hindmargin on veins 2, 3, and 4. The hindwings have a rufous line just beyond the middle, and an antemedian rufous line, visible only towards inner margin.
