= Nidara croceina =

Scientific classification
- Domain: Eukaryota
- Kingdom: Animalia
- Phylum: Arthropoda
- Class: Insecta
- Order: Lepidoptera
- Family: Drepanidae
- Genus: Nidara
- Species: N. croceina

Binomial name
- Nidara croceina Mabille, 1898

Species of hook-tip moth

Nidara croceina is a moth in the family Drepanidae. It was described by Paul Mabille in 1898. It is found on Madagascar.
