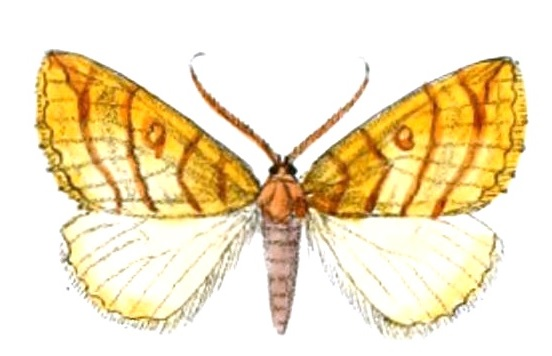

Scientific classification
- Domain: Eukaryota
- Kingdom: Animalia
- Phylum: Arthropoda
- Class: Insecta
- Order: Lepidoptera
- Family: Drepanidae
- Genus: Spica
- Species: S. luteola

Binomial name
- Spica luteola Swinhoe, 1889

= Spica luteola =

Species of false owlet moth

Spica luteola is a moth in the family Drepanidae. It was described by Charles Swinhoe in 1889. It is found in India, Nepal and Tibet, China.
