= Strepsigonia placida =

Scientific classification
- Domain: Eukaryota
- Kingdom: Animalia
- Phylum: Arthropoda
- Class: Insecta
- Order: Lepidoptera
- Family: Drepanidae
- Genus: Strepsigonia
- Species: S. placida

Binomial name
- Strepsigonia placida (C. Swinhoe, 1902)

Synonyms
- Gogana placida C. Swinhoe, 1902; Monurodes trigonoptera Warren, 1923

Species of hook-tip moth

Strepsigonia placida is a moth in the family Drepanidae. It was described by Charles Swinhoe in 1902. It is found in Myanmar and on Peninsular Malaysia and Borneo.

Adults are uniform pinkish grey, both wings with very indistinct, outwardly-curved, crenelated grey antemedial and postmedial lines. The forewings have two black dots at the end of the cell and the hindwings with three. The underside is paler and shining and has the dots as above.
