= Pseuderosia humiliata =

Scientific classification
- Domain: Eukaryota
- Kingdom: Animalia
- Phylum: Arthropoda
- Class: Insecta
- Order: Lepidoptera
- Family: Drepanidae
- Genus: Pseuderosia
- Species: P. humiliata

Binomial name
- Pseuderosia humiliata (Walker, 1861)

Synonyms
- Acidalia humiliata Walker, 1861

Species of hook-tip moth

Pseuderosia humiliata is a moth in the family Drepanidae. It was described by Francis Walker in 1861. It is found on Borneo.

Adults are the colour of bone, the wings with denticulated very oblique brown lines. The discal point is black and distinct and the marginal points are black and minute. The exterior line on the forewings is distinguished by black streaks towards the costa. There is a submarginal line of irregular blackish points. The hindwings have the middle and exterior lines broad. The costa is slightly excavated beyond the middle and slightly and obliquely truncated towards the tip, which is notched.
