= Habrona papuata =

Scientific classification
- Domain: Eukaryota
- Kingdom: Animalia
- Phylum: Arthropoda
- Class: Insecta
- Order: Lepidoptera
- Family: Drepanidae
- Genus: Habrona
- Species: H. papuata

Binomial name
- Habrona papuata (Warren, 1915)

Synonyms
- Gaurena papuata Warren, 1915; Cymotrix unimacula Gaede, 1930

Species of false owlet moth

Habrona papuata is a moth in the family Drepanidae. It is found in Papua and Papua New Guinea, where it has been recorded from mountainous areas.

The wingspan is about 36 mm (1.4 in). The forewings are pale olive, suffused in parts with dark olive fuscous. The inner line is white, fine and mixed with olive above the middle, projecting and twice bent below, broadly white, then inbent, dentate inwards on vein 1 and above the inner margin, preceded below the median by dark suffusion. The outer line is outcurved, lunulate-dentate, marked with white from the costa to vein 6 and again from vein 2 to the inner margin, where it is followed by a black triangular mark. From the costa to vein 4 it is followed by a pale olive curved band with a darker centre. The median area, except on the inner margin below vein 1, is suffused with dark fuscous, the dark waved cross lines alternated with olive lines. The orbicular stigma has the form of a white dot and there is a large white apical blotch, narrowing to a point at vein 6, connected by three white dots on veins 3, 4 and 5 with an angulated white mark on the inner margin beyond the black triangle. There is a row of white black-edged spots before the termen. The hindwings are dull greyish ochreous with a darker subterminal shade.
