= Urogonodes patiens =

Scientific classification
- Domain: Eukaryota
- Kingdom: Animalia
- Phylum: Arthropoda
- Class: Insecta
- Order: Lepidoptera
- Family: Drepanidae
- Genus: Urogonodes
- Species: U. patiens

Binomial name
- Urogonodes patiens (Warren, 1906)

Synonyms
- Oreta patiens Warren, 1906; Psiloreta rufula Warren, 1923; Urogonodes sobria Warren, 1923; Urogonodes ochracea Warren, 1923

Species of hook-tip moth

Urogonodes patiens is a moth in the family Drepanidae. It was described by William Warren in 1906. It is found in New Guinea.

The wingspan is about 30 mm for males and 40 mm for females. The forewings are hyaline (glass like), the basal area, costal area above the subcostal vein and the hindmarginal border clothed with sparse grey scales. There is a dark paler-edged lunulate-dentate line at about one-third from the base. There is a lunulate-dentate dark line in the grey marginal area, running out from the costa at three-fourths and below the middle, forming the limit of the hyaline space. There is a round hyaline marginal spot between veins 3 and 4 and the marginal area below the apex is semihyaline. There is also a dark grey marginal line, spotted on the veins. The hindwings are grey, with the base, an angled band beyond the middle and the marginal spot between veins 3 and 4 hyaline.
