= Euphalacra semisecta =

Scientific classification
- Domain: Eukaryota
- Kingdom: Animalia
- Phylum: Arthropoda
- Class: Insecta
- Order: Lepidoptera
- Family: Drepanidae
- Genus: Euphalacra
- Species: E. semisecta

Binomial name
- Euphalacra semisecta (Warren, 1922)

Synonyms
- Ectothyris semisecta Warren, 1922; Neophalacra laticornis Roepke, 1951

Species of hook-tip moth

Euphalacra semisecta is a moth in the family Drepanidae. The first known description is by William Warren in 1922, although Warren attributed the species to Hampson. It is found on Borneo, Sumatra and Peninsular Malaysia, with a type locality on Sumatra.

== Food sources ==
The larvae feed on Plectocomiopsis geminiflorus. A survey in 2013 found that adults are attracted to bait traps with fermenting banana, and were the only species of Drepanidae recorded in the survey to prefer them over bait traps with rotting prawn.

== Appearance ==
Euphalacra semisecta has pale forewings marked with interrupted brown bands and rounded anterior corners.
