= Pseuderosia cristata =

Scientific classification
- Kingdom: Animalia
- Phylum: Arthropoda
- Class: Insecta
- Order: Lepidoptera
- Family: Drepanidae
- Genus: Pseuderosia
- Species: P. cristata

Binomial name
- Pseuderosia cristata Snellen, 1889

Species of hook-tip moth

Pseuderosia cristata is a moth in the family Drepanidae. It was described by Snellen in 1889. It is found in Sundaland.

The larvae feed on Korthalsia rigida and Elaeis species.
