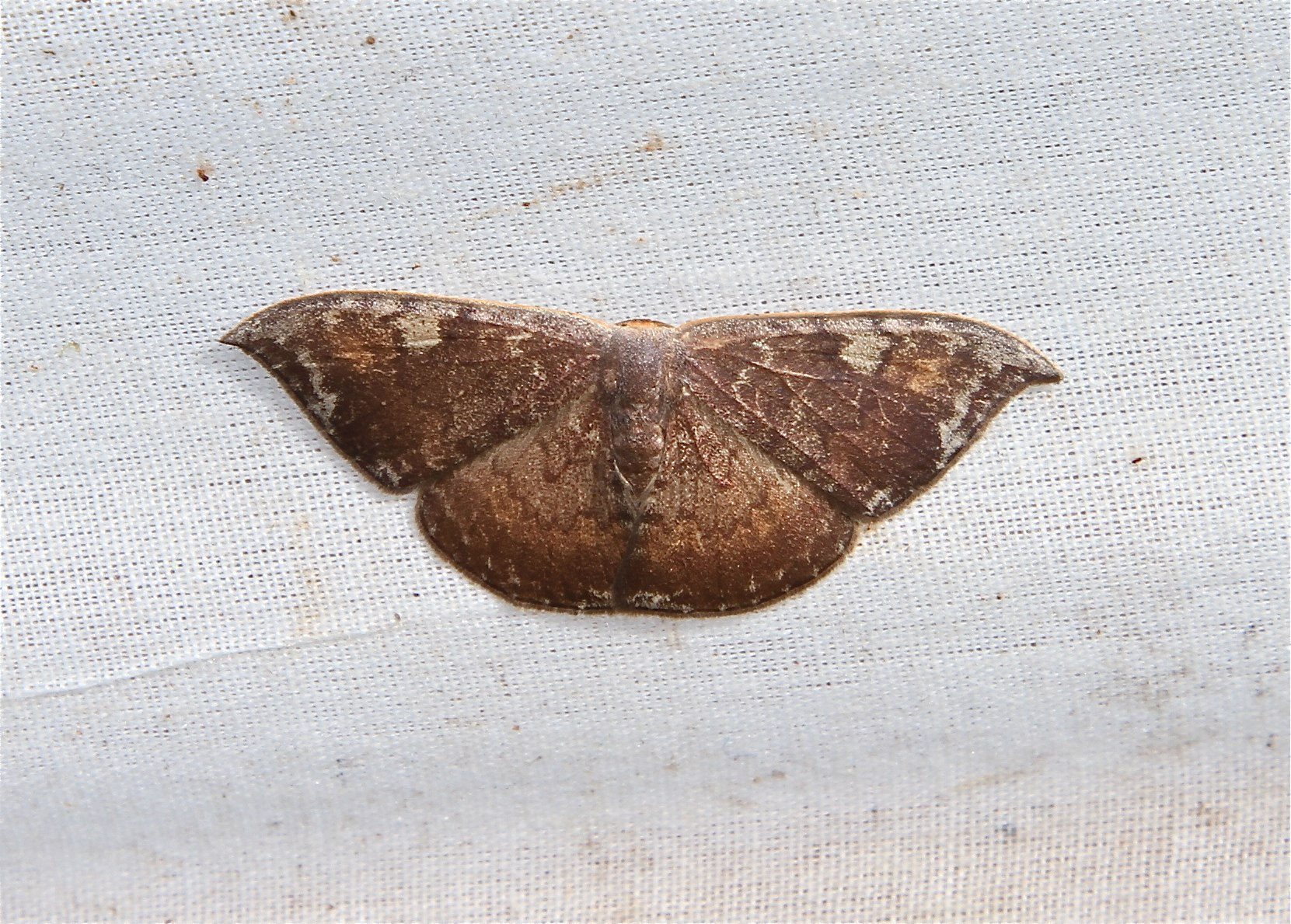

Scientific classification
- Kingdom: Animalia
- Phylum: Arthropoda
- Clade: Pancrustacea
- Class: Insecta
- Order: Lepidoptera
- Family: Drepanidae
- Genus: Paralbara
- Species: P. watsoni

Binomial name
- Paralbara watsoni Holloway, 1976

Synonyms
- Albara watsoni Holloway, 1976

= Paralbara watsoni =

Species of hook-tip moth

Paralbara watsoni is a moth in the family Drepanidae. It was described by Jeremy Daniel Holloway in 1976. It is found on Sumatra, Borneo and Peninsular Malaysia.
