= Habrona alboplagata =

Scientific classification
- Domain: Eukaryota
- Kingdom: Animalia
- Phylum: Arthropoda
- Class: Insecta
- Order: Lepidoptera
- Family: Drepanidae
- Genus: Habrona
- Species: H. alboplagata

Binomial name
- Habrona alboplagata Bethune-Baker, 1908

Species of false owlet moth

Habrona alboplagata is a moth in the family Drepanidae. It was described by George Thomas Bethune-Baker in 1908. It is found in Papua New Guinea.

The wingspan is 50–55 mm. The forewings are russet brown, with a white outwardly produced, somewhat scalloped and irregular basal line, expanding into a spot on the upper margin of the cell. There are traces of two dark median wavy lines, followed by a strongly produced postmedian dark line, beyond which are two fine, very obscure, dark wavy lines rising in a small whitish costal patch. There is a large white patch at the apex and another at the tornus, with three white spots between them and three white dots at the costa before the apex. There are fine white spots at the termen and two white dots mark the reniform. The hindwings are shiny greyish, more ochreous at the base.
