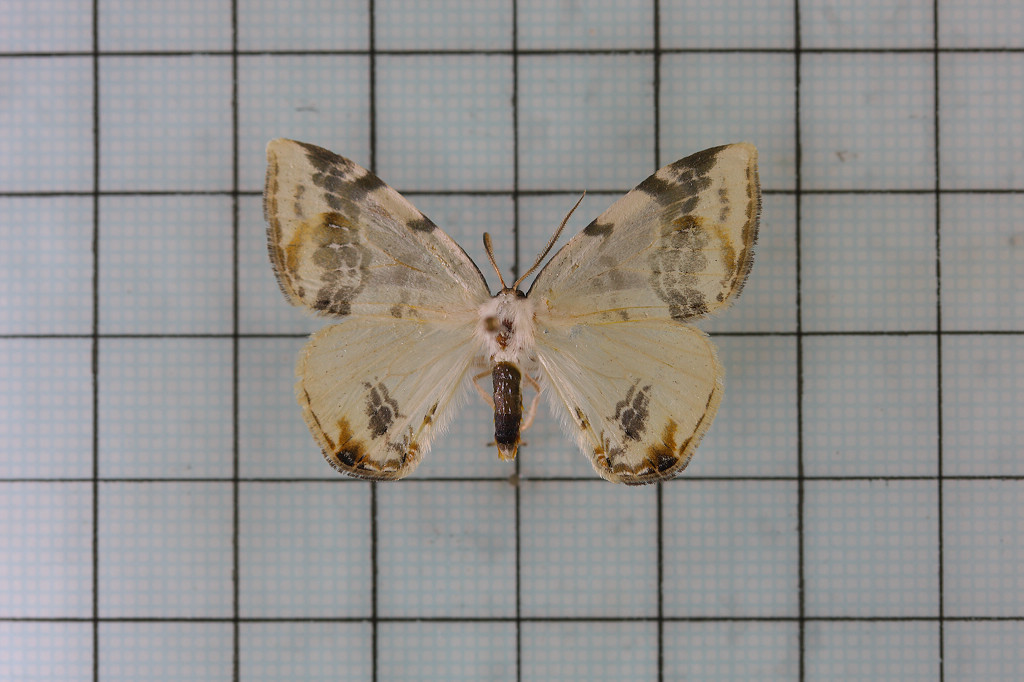

Scientific classification
- Kingdom: Animalia
- Phylum: Arthropoda
- Class: Insecta
- Order: Lepidoptera
- Family: Drepanidae
- Genus: Sewa
- Species: S. taiwana

Binomial name
- Sewa taiwana (Wileman, 1911)

Synonyms
- Macrocilix taiwana Wileman, 1911; Parapsestis taiwana

= Sewa taiwana =

Species of hook-tip moth

Sewa taiwana is a moth of the family Drepanidae first described by Alfred Ernest Wileman in 1911. It is found in Taiwan.
