= Strepsigonia affinis =

Scientific classification
- Domain: Eukaryota
- Kingdom: Animalia
- Phylum: Arthropoda
- Class: Insecta
- Order: Lepidoptera
- Family: Drepanidae
- Genus: Strepsigonia
- Species: S. affinis

Binomial name
- Strepsigonia affinis Warren, 1897

Species of hook-tip moth

Strepsigonia affinis is a moth in the family Drepanidae. It was described by Warren in 1897. It is found in Peninsular Malaysia and Borneo.

The wingspan is about 27 mm. The forewings are pinkish ochreous with grey suffusion and two spots on the discocellular. There is a ferruginous wavy line, nearly vertical and before the middle. There is also a strongly dentate line at the middle of the costa, running out from veins 3 to 5 an inward again to the middle of the inner margin. The included space is pale rufous. There is a pale, lunulate submarginal line with dark grey shading on both sides and a dark spot between veins 6 and 7. The hindwings are the same as the forewings.
