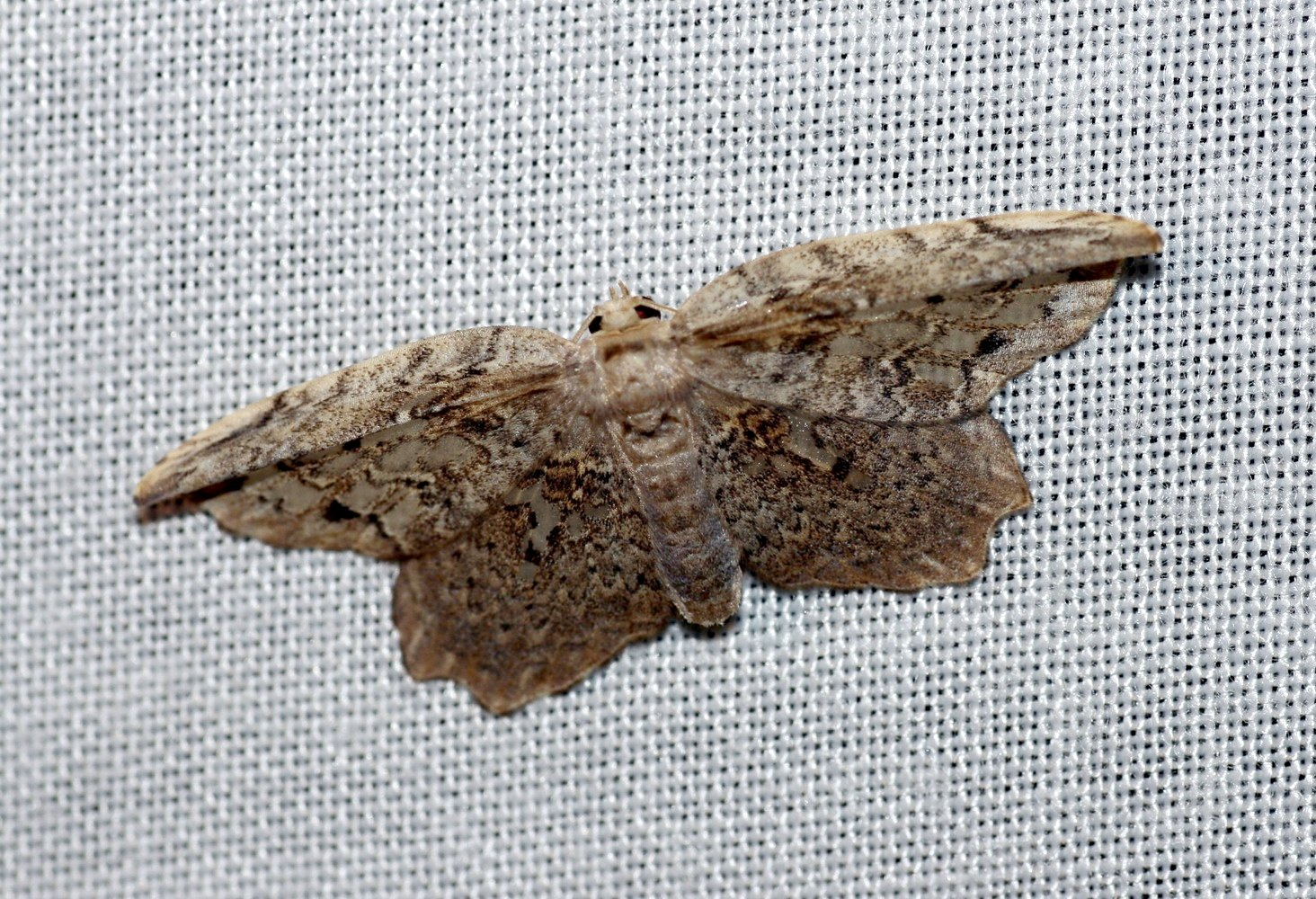

Scientific classification
- Kingdom: Animalia
- Phylum: Arthropoda
- Clade: Pancrustacea
- Class: Insecta
- Order: Lepidoptera
- Family: Drepanidae
- Genus: Euphalacra
- Species: E. discipuncta

Binomial name
- Euphalacra discipuncta (Holloway, 1976)

Synonyms
- Ectothyris discipuncta Holloway, 1976

= Euphalacra discipuncta =

Species of hook-tip moth

Euphalacra discipuncta is a moth in the family Drepanidae. It was described by Jeremy Daniel Holloway in 1976. It is found on Borneo. The habitat consists of lowland to lower montane forests.
