= Strepsigonia nigrimaculata =

Scientific classification
- Domain: Eukaryota
- Kingdom: Animalia
- Phylum: Arthropoda
- Class: Insecta
- Order: Lepidoptera
- Family: Drepanidae
- Genus: Strepsigonia
- Species: S. nigrimaculata

Binomial name
- Strepsigonia nigrimaculata Warren, 1897

Species of hook-tip moth

Strepsigonia nigrimaculata is a moth in the family Drepanidae. It was described by Warren in 1897. It is found in western Malaysia.

The wingspan is about 26 mm. The forewings are reddish grey with darker grey markings and indistinct lines. The first is found at one fourth and is very obscure, while the second and third are close together in the middle of the wing. They are irregularly curved and dentate and the space between them is slightly darker. There are two black dots on the discocellular and a lunulate and dentate submarginal line, preceded by a darker shade and with a dark grey blotch above vein 6 towards the apex. The marginal area is narrowly greyish. The hindwings have a pale pinkish ochreous costal area, without darker dusting. There is an oblong blackish blotch on the inner margin with a denticulate outer margin, passing outside a small black dot at the lower end of the discocellular. The hindmarginal area is tinged with dark grey.
