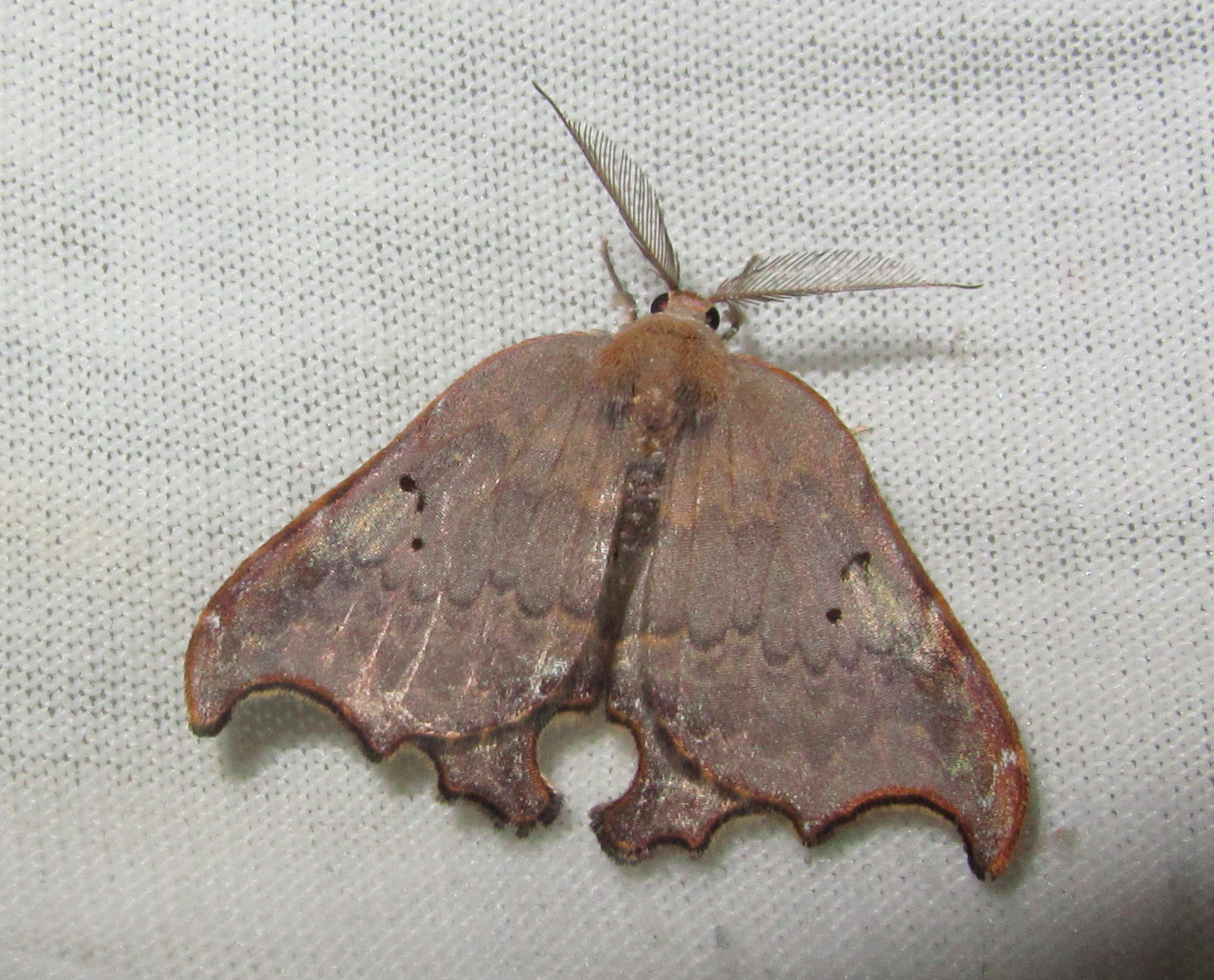

Scientific classification
- Kingdom: Animalia
- Phylum: Arthropoda
- Class: Insecta
- Order: Lepidoptera
- Family: Drepanidae
- Genus: Thymistida
- Species: T. tripunctata

Binomial name
- Thymistida tripunctata Walker, 1865

Synonyms
- Erosia cervinaria Moore, 1867; Thymistida nigritincta divisa Bryk, 1943

= Thymistida tripunctata =

Species of hook-tip moth

Thymistida tripunctata is a moth in the family Drepanidae. It was described by Francis Walker in 1865. It is found in north-eastern India, northern Myanmar and Sichuan, China.

Adults are fawn coloured, tinged with cinereous beneath. The forewings have two transverse denticulated blackish lines. The first antemedial and less distinct than the second, which is postmedial. There is a blackish marginal space with a zigzag fawn-coloured line. There are also three black points on the veins at the end of the discal areolet. The hindwings are pale cinereous.
