= Habrona marmorata =

Scientific classification
- Domain: Eukaryota
- Kingdom: Animalia
- Phylum: Arthropoda
- Class: Insecta
- Order: Lepidoptera
- Family: Drepanidae
- Genus: Habrona
- Species: H. marmorata

Binomial name
- Habrona marmorata (Warren, 1915)

Synonyms
- Gaurena marmorata Warren, 1915; Gaurena trimacula Gaede, 1930

Species of false owlet moth

Habrona marmorata is a moth in the family Drepanidae. It is widely distributed in Papua and Papua New Guinea.

The wingspan is about 42 mm. The forewings are brownish ochreous, suffused with darker brown. There are two black spots outwardly margined with white in a line beneath the median vein at the base and the inner line is white, oblique, blotchy to the submedian fold, below it forming a crescent externally and angled basewards on vein 1. There are three oblique crinkly dark brown lines, forming a sort of inner band. There are also four blackish brown lines, all angled outwards in the middle of the wing, forming an outer band. On the costa, the median vein and veinlets, and vein 1, the pale spaces between all these lines become white and the dark lines themselves blacker. The outer band is limited, as the inner is, preceded by a blotchy white line, which is continuous only at the costa and inner margin, followed here by a velvety black block at the anal angle, and on the costa by a brown triangle. The subterminal line consists of a row of white vein-spots, that on vein 2 larger and yellowish, emitting an angled line beyond the black anal blotch. Towards the costa it becomes continuous, and is met by an oblique white streak from below the apex, above which is a whitish brown-sprinkled apical blotch. There is a row of large white lunate spots before the termen. The hindwings are ochreous with a diffuse grey subterminal band and greyish suffusion.
