= Argodrepana tenebra =

Scientific classification
- Kingdom: Animalia
- Phylum: Arthropoda
- Clade: Pancrustacea
- Class: Insecta
- Order: Lepidoptera
- Family: Drepanidae
- Genus: Argodrepana
- Species: A. tenebra

Binomial name
- Argodrepana tenebra Wilkinson, 1967

Species of hook-tip moth

Argodrepana tenebra is a moth in the family Drepanidae. It was described by Wilkinson in 1967. It is found in New Guinea.
