= Eudeilinia luteifera =

Scientific classification
- Kingdom: Animalia
- Phylum: Arthropoda
- Class: Insecta
- Order: Lepidoptera
- Family: Drepanidae
- Genus: Eudeilinia
- Species: E. luteifera

Binomial name
- Eudeilinia luteifera Dyar, 1917

Species of hook-tip moth

Eudeilinia luteifera, the southern eudeilinea moth, is a moth in the family Drepanidae. It was described by Harrison Gray Dyar Jr. in 1917. It is found in the United States, where it has been recorded from Texas to Florida.

The wingspan is about 25 mm. Adults are white, the forewings with two curved irregular pale buff lines. The hindwings are similar, but the inner line is smaller. Adults have been recorded on wing in March and from May to June in Florida.

The larvae feed on Cornus florida.
