= Pseudalbara fuscifascia =

Scientific classification
- Kingdom: Animalia
- Phylum: Arthropoda
- Class: Insecta
- Order: Lepidoptera
- Family: Drepanidae
- Genus: Pseudalbara
- Species: P. fuscifascia

Binomial name
- Pseudalbara fuscifascia Watson, 1968

Species of hook-tip moth

Pseudalbara fuscifascia is a moth in the family Drepanidae. It was described by Watson in 1968. It is found in China (Zhejiang, Sichuan).

The length of the forewings is 13–14 mm for males and 15–16.5 mm for females.
