= Astatochroa sulphurata =

Scientific classification
- Domain: Eukaryota
- Kingdom: Animalia
- Phylum: Arthropoda
- Class: Insecta
- Order: Lepidoptera
- Family: Drepanidae
- Genus: Astatochroa
- Species: A. sulphurata

Binomial name
- Astatochroa sulphurata (Warren, 1907)

Synonyms
- Oreta sulphurata Warren, 1907; Psiloreta sulphurata

Species of hook-tip moth

Astatochroa sulphurata is a moth in the family Drepanidae. It was described by William Warren in 1907. It is found in Papua New Guinea.

The wingspan is about 26 mm for males and 30 mm for females. The forewings of the males are pale yellow, the base of the costa reddish. There are two pale brown lines from the inner margin to vein 6 and the subcostal vein. The outer margin is purplish grey, edged by a brown submarginal line, which form a small black-brown pink-edged blotch on veins 2 and 3 and a smaller one on the inner margin. The hindwings have two brown lines and the apex has a slight purplish-grey tinge. Females have greyish-pink forewings with an olive tinge and purplish lines. The costal area of the hindwings is yellowish.
