= Argodrepana auratifrons =

Scientific classification
- Domain: Eukaryota
- Kingdom: Animalia
- Phylum: Arthropoda
- Class: Insecta
- Order: Lepidoptera
- Family: Drepanidae
- Genus: Argodrepana
- Species: A. auratifrons

Binomial name
- Argodrepana auratifrons (Warren, 1922)

Synonyms
- Peridrepana auratifrons Warren, 1922

Species of hook-tip moth

Argodrepana auratifrons is a moth in the family Drepanidae. It was described by William Warren in 1922. It is found in New Guinea.
