= Euphalacra trifenestrata =

Scientific classification
- Domain: Eukaryota
- Kingdom: Animalia
- Phylum: Arthropoda
- Class: Insecta
- Order: Lepidoptera
- Family: Drepanidae
- Genus: Euphalacra
- Species: E. trifenestrata

Binomial name
- Euphalacra trifenestrata (C. Swinhoe, 1902)

Synonyms
- Ectothyris trifenestrata C. Swinhoe, 1902

Species of hook-tip moth

Euphalacra trifenestrata is a moth in the family Drepanidae. It was described by Charles Swinhoe in 1902. It is found on Borneo and Peninsular Malaysia.

Adults are ochreous suffused with rufous and have a grey anal tuft. The forewings have a double rufous antemedial line, angled below the costa, and with traces of two lines beyond it. The costal area is streaked with ochreous and there are two dark postmedial costal marks, three hyaline (glass like) patches beyond the lower angle of the cell, as well as dark specks on the veins between them, and bounded by an oblique ochreous postmedial line. There is also an indistinct minutely dentate ochreous submarginal line. The hindwings have an oblique dark antemedial line, three hyaline patches beyond the lower angle of the cell, a dark-edged ochreous postraedial line and a dentate ochreous submarginal line.
