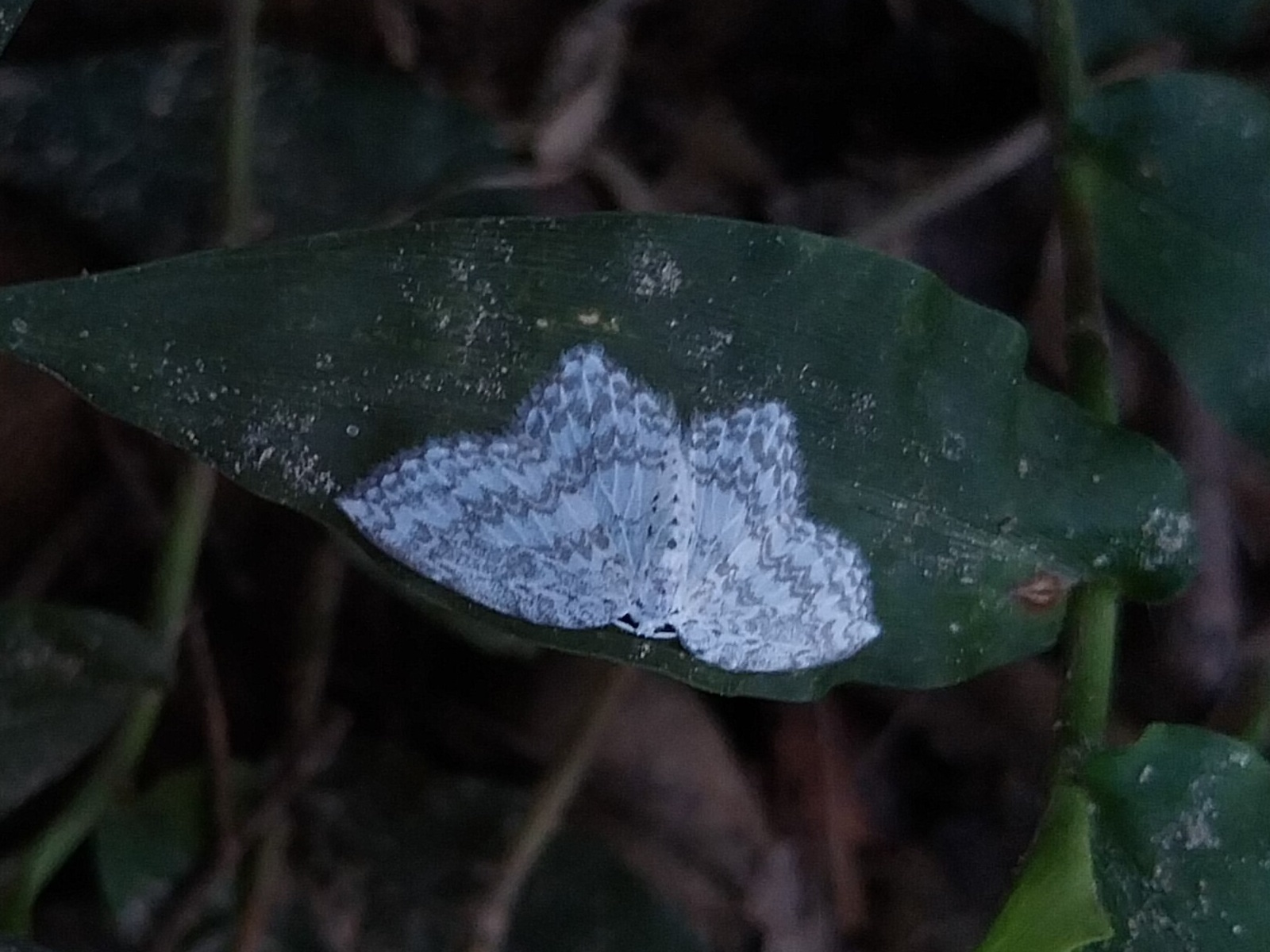

Scientific classification
- Kingdom: Animalia
- Phylum: Arthropoda
- Class: Insecta
- Order: Lepidoptera
- Family: Drepanidae
- Genus: Zusidava
- Species: Z. serratilinea

Binomial name
- Zusidava serratilinea (Wileman & South, 1917)

Synonyms
- Leucodrepana serratilinea Wileman, 1917

= Zusidava serratilinea =

Species of hook-tip moth

Zusidava serratilinea is a moth in the family Drepanidae first described by Wileman and South in 1917. It is found in Taiwan.

The wingspan is 23–27 mm. Adults are on wing in June, July and October.

The larvae feed on the leaves of Prunus phaeosticta phaeosticta.
