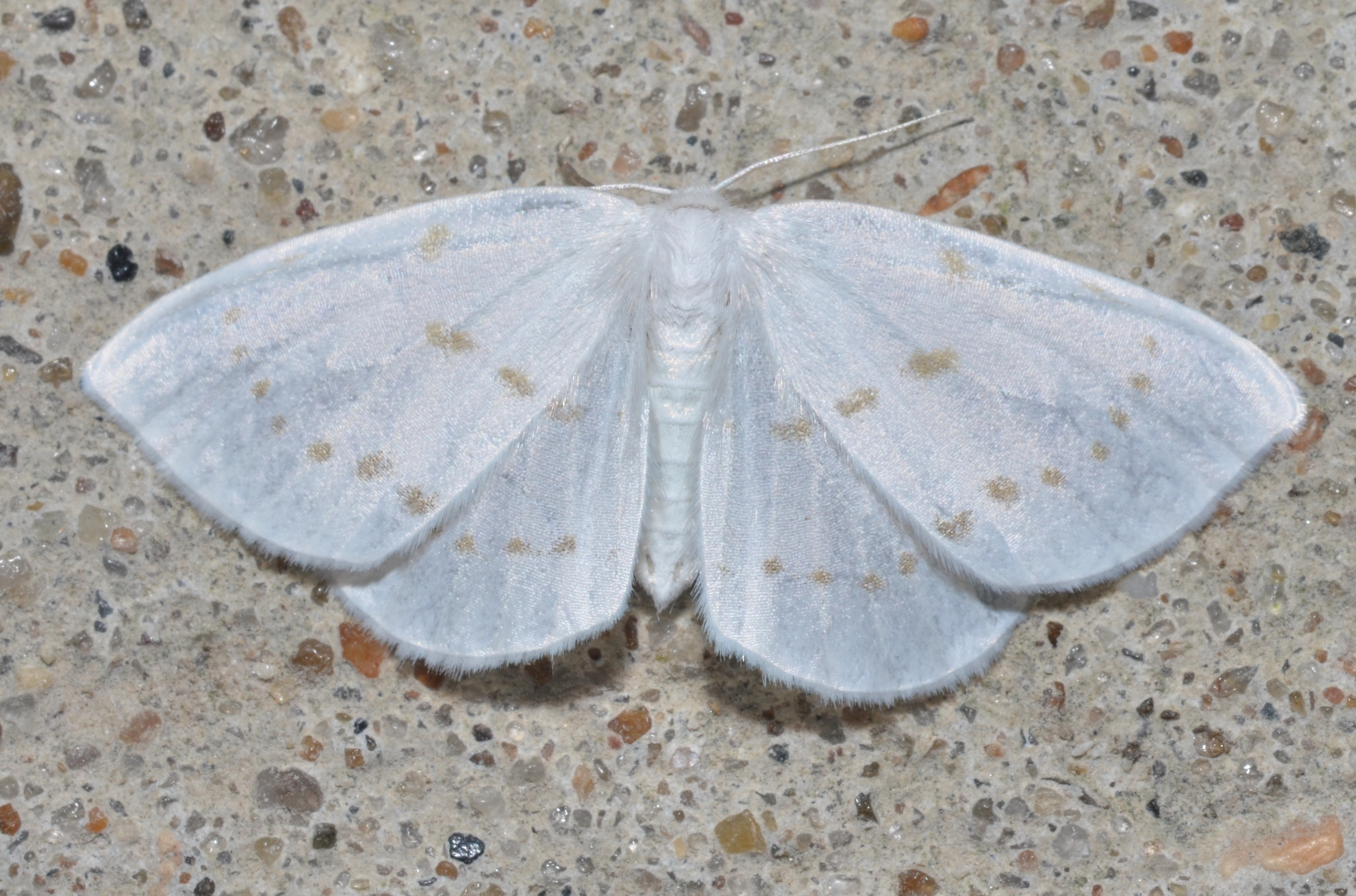

Scientific classification
- Kingdom: Animalia
- Phylum: Arthropoda
- Class: Insecta
- Order: Lepidoptera
- Family: Drepanidae
- Genus: Eudeilinia
- Species: E. herminiata

Binomial name
- Eudeilinia herminiata (Guenée, 1857)

Synonyms
- Corycia hermineata Guenée, 1857; Corycia albata Guenée, 1857; Corycia biseriata Packard, 1873

= Eudeilinia herminiata =

Species of hook-tip moth

Eudeilinia herminiata, the northern eudeilinia, is a moth in the family Drepanidae. It was described by Achille Guenée in 1857. It is found in North America, where it has been recorded from British Columbia to Newfoundland, south to Florida and west to Texas. The habitat consists of deciduous woods and wood edges.

The wingspan is 25–30 mm. Adults are on wing from April to September in one generation per year.

The larvae feed on Cornus species.
