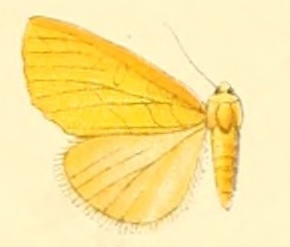

Scientific classification
- Domain: Eukaryota
- Kingdom: Animalia
- Phylum: Arthropoda
- Class: Insecta
- Order: Lepidoptera
- Family: Drepanidae
- Genus: Spica
- Species: S. parallelangula

Binomial name
- Spica parallelangula Alphéraky, 1893

Synonyms
- Plusinia aurea Gaede, 1930

= Spica parallelangula =

Species of false owlet moth

Spica parallelangula is a moth in the family Drepanidae. It was described by Sergei Alphéraky in 1893. It is found in the Chinese provinces of Shaanxi, Ningxia, Gansu, Hubei, Hunan, Guangxi, Sichuan, Chongqing and Yunnan and in Myanmar.
