= Euphalacra nigridorsata =

Scientific classification
- Domain: Eukaryota
- Kingdom: Animalia
- Phylum: Arthropoda
- Class: Insecta
- Order: Lepidoptera
- Family: Drepanidae
- Genus: Euphalacra
- Species: E. nigridorsata

Binomial name
- Euphalacra nigridorsata Warren, 1897

Species of hook-tip moth

Euphalacra nigridorsata is a moth in the family Drepanidae. It was described by Warren in 1897. It is found in the north-eastern Himalayas.

The wingspan is 39 mm for males and 45 mm for females. The forewings are pale ochreous with pale grey-brown suffusion and lines. There is a diffused grey-brown streak from the base through the cell, as well as three fine, very acutely dentate brown lines before the middle, marked with dark points on the veins. There is a blackish dot at the middle of the discocellular, proceeded by a pale ochreous elongated spot. There is a smaller blackish dot at the lower end of the cell and three strongly waved postmedian brown lines, marked with a brownish streak running through to the upper tooth and preceded by an oblique streak of the pale ground colour. There is a waved submarginal line and a row of black marginal spots. The hindwings have two dark brown antemedian lines, forming a continuation of the oblique brown streak of the forewings. There are two pale brown waved median lines and two waved postmedian lines, the outer one darker. The submarginal line and marginal spots are as in the forewings.
