= Urogonodes macrura =

Scientific classification
- Kingdom: Animalia
- Phylum: Arthropoda
- Class: Insecta
- Order: Lepidoptera
- Family: Drepanidae
- Genus: Urogonodes
- Species: U. macrura

Binomial name
- Urogonodes macrura Warren, 1923

Synonyms
- Urogonodes praecisa Warren, 1923; Urogonodes macrura seminigra Warren, 1923

Species of hook-tip moth

Urogonodes macrura is a moth in the family Drepanidae. It was described by Warren in 1923. It is found in New Guinea, where it is probably restricted to higher mountains.

It is a variable species.
