= Habrona concinna =

Scientific classification
- Domain: Eukaryota
- Kingdom: Animalia
- Phylum: Arthropoda
- Class: Insecta
- Order: Lepidoptera
- Family: Drepanidae
- Genus: Habrona
- Species: H. concinna

Binomial name
- Habrona concinna Warren, 1915

Synonyms
- Cymotrix submarginalis Gaede, 1930

Species of false owlet moth

Habrona concinna is a moth in the family Drepanidae. It is found in Papua and Papua New Guinea, where it has been recorded from mountainous areas.

The wingspan is 48–52 mm (1.9–2.0 in). The forewings are black-brown, the inner and outer lines slender and ochreous. The inner is obliquely curved outwards and roundly bent on the submedian fold, angled on vein 1. The median vein is ochreous from the base to the inner line, which is slightly inbent at the point and the outer line is bluntly rounded in the midwing. The orbicular stigma is obsolete and the reniform is black with a snow-white or yellowish dot at the centre, on each side of it a pair of waved black lines, sometimes united below the middle, where the inner margin is sometimes paler brown. The veins at the termen form a pale brownish ochreous spikes, that on vein 2 reach the outer line. They are finely white-edged and have a white angled line below it to vein 1. There is a paler apical blotch and a submarginal shade which is scarcely visible. The terminal area is pale brown beyond a fine white line interrupted by the veins. The hindwings are fuscous, but paler at the base. The veins at the termen and the fringe are ochreous.
