= Paralbara achlyscarleta =

Scientific classification
- Domain: Eukaryota
- Kingdom: Animalia
- Phylum: Arthropoda
- Class: Insecta
- Order: Lepidoptera
- Family: Drepanidae
- Genus: Paralbara
- Species: P. achlyscarleta

Binomial name
- Paralbara achlyscarleta Chu & Wang, 1987

Species of hook-tip moth

Paralbara achlyscarleta is a moth in the family Drepanidae. It was described by Hong-Fu Chu and Lin-Yao Wang in 1987. It is found in China.
