= Urogonodes scintillans =

Scientific classification
- Domain: Eukaryota
- Kingdom: Animalia
- Phylum: Arthropoda
- Class: Insecta
- Order: Lepidoptera
- Family: Drepanidae
- Genus: Urogonodes
- Species: U. scintillans

Binomial name
- Urogonodes scintillans (Warren, 1896)

Synonyms
- Oreta scintillans Warren, 1896; Cyclura inconspicua Warren, 1899; Urogonodes colorata Warren, 1907; Urogonodes flavida Warren, 1907; Urogonodes flaviplaga Warren, 1923; Urogonodes cervina Warren, 1923; Urogonodes fumosa Warren, 1923; Urogonodes perrufa Warren, 1923

Species of hook-tip moth

Urogonodes scintillans is a moth in the family Drepanidae. It was described by William Warren in 1896. It is found in New Guinea.

The wingspan is about 26 mm. The forewings are olive ochreous, mottled with pale brownish. These mottlings forming a curved line at one-third and a diffuse shade in the middle. There are traces of dark spots towards the hindmargin.
