= Paralbara muscularia =

Scientific classification
- Kingdom: Animalia
- Phylum: Arthropoda
- Class: Insecta
- Order: Lepidoptera
- Family: Drepanidae
- Genus: Paralbara
- Species: P. muscularia

Binomial name
- Paralbara muscularia (Walker, 1866)

Synonyms
- Fascellina muscularia Walker, 1866; Drepana orphnina Hampson, [1893]; Albara orphnina ab. subpallida Warren; Albara inaequidiscata Warren, 1922

Species of hook-tip moth

Paralbara muscularia is a moth in the family Drepanidae. It was described by Francis Walker in 1866. It is found in northern India, northern Myanmar and southern China.

The wingspan is about 32 mm. Adults are cinereous brown, the wings with two dark brown lines, the first antemedial and the second postmedial. The latter has a zigzag course and borders the inner side of a dark red broad irregular band.
