= Sewa orbiferata =

Scientific classification
- Kingdom: Animalia
- Phylum: Arthropoda
- Class: Insecta
- Order: Lepidoptera
- Family: Drepanidae
- Genus: Sewa
- Species: S. orbiferata

Binomial name
- Sewa orbiferata (Walker, 1862)

Synonyms
- Abraxas orbiferata Walker, 1862; Macrocilix orbiferata; Argyris insignata Moore, [1868]; Abraxas orbiferata cilicoides Snellen, 1889

Species of hook-tip moth

Sewa orbiferata is a moth in the family Drepanidae. It was described by Francis Walker in 1862. It is found in northern India, northern Myanmar, Malaysia, Borneo, Java and China (Sichuan, Zhejiang, Fujian).

Adults are white, the forewings with four cinereous obliquely quadrate spots on the costa and an irregular broad discal transverse band, which is transversed by two short wavy streaks and a submarginal series of small spots. The marginal line is blackish. The hindwings are suffused with orange yellow on the lower part of the exterior border and there is a brownish-cinereous submarginal band, maculated anteriorly and traversed posteriorly by two parallel white lines, beneath which are three short black streaks. Two similar streaks are found above it on the abdominal margin.

== Subspecies ==
- Sewa orbiferata orbiferata (northern India, northern Myanmar, Malaysia, Borneo, China: Sichuan, Zhejiang, Fujian)
- Sewa orbiferata cilicoides (Snellen, 1889) (Java)
