= Pseudalbara parvula =

Scientific classification
- Kingdom: Animalia
- Phylum: Arthropoda
- Class: Insecta
- Order: Lepidoptera
- Family: Drepanidae
- Genus: Pseudalbara
- Species: P. parvula

Binomial name
- Pseudalbara parvula (Leech, 1890)

Synonyms
- Drepana parvula Leech, 1890; Drepana muscula Staudinger, 1892; Drepana griseola Matsumura, [1909]

Species of hook-tip moth

Pseudalbara parvula is a moth in the family Drepanidae. It was described by John Henry Leech in 1890. It is found in China (Zhejiang, Fujian, Hubei, Hunan, Sichuan, Guangxi, Manchuria), south-eastern Russia and Japan.

The wingspan is about 24 mm. The ground colour of the forewings is mouse grey with two white dots at the end of the cell, from the first of which a dark line curves to the inner margin. Two other dark lines start at the apex, one descending with a slight curve to the outer angle, the other to the centre of the inner margin. At the apex is a small yellowish spot, bordered externally with black. The hindwings are brownish grey.
