= Argodrepana verticata =

Scientific classification
- Domain: Eukaryota
- Kingdom: Animalia
- Phylum: Arthropoda
- Class: Insecta
- Order: Lepidoptera
- Family: Drepanidae
- Genus: Argodrepana
- Species: A. verticata

Binomial name
- Argodrepana verticata (Warren, 1907)

Synonyms
- Peridrepana verticata Warren, 1907

Species of hook-tip moth

Argodrepana verticata is a moth in the family Drepanidae. It was described by William Warren in 1907. It is found in New Guinea.

The wingspan is 30–35 mm. The forewings are white and semi-transparent, crossed by five grey bands, all nearly parallel to the outer margin, and marked on the veins with darker grey dashes. There are two antemedian lines, of which the basal is very obscure, and one postmedian line, as well as two submarginal lines, the outer of which is a lunulate-dentate line, with the teeth touching the grey marginal line. All bands are present on the hindwings, the last three meeting at the anal angle.
