= Urogonodes clinala =

Scientific classification
- Kingdom: Animalia
- Phylum: Arthropoda
- Clade: Pancrustacea
- Class: Insecta
- Order: Lepidoptera
- Family: Drepanidae
- Genus: Urogonodes
- Species: U. clinala

Binomial name
- Urogonodes clinala Wilkinson, 1972

Species of hook-tip moth

Urogonodes clinala is a moth in the family Drepanidae. It was described by Wilkinson in 1972. It is found in Nepal.
