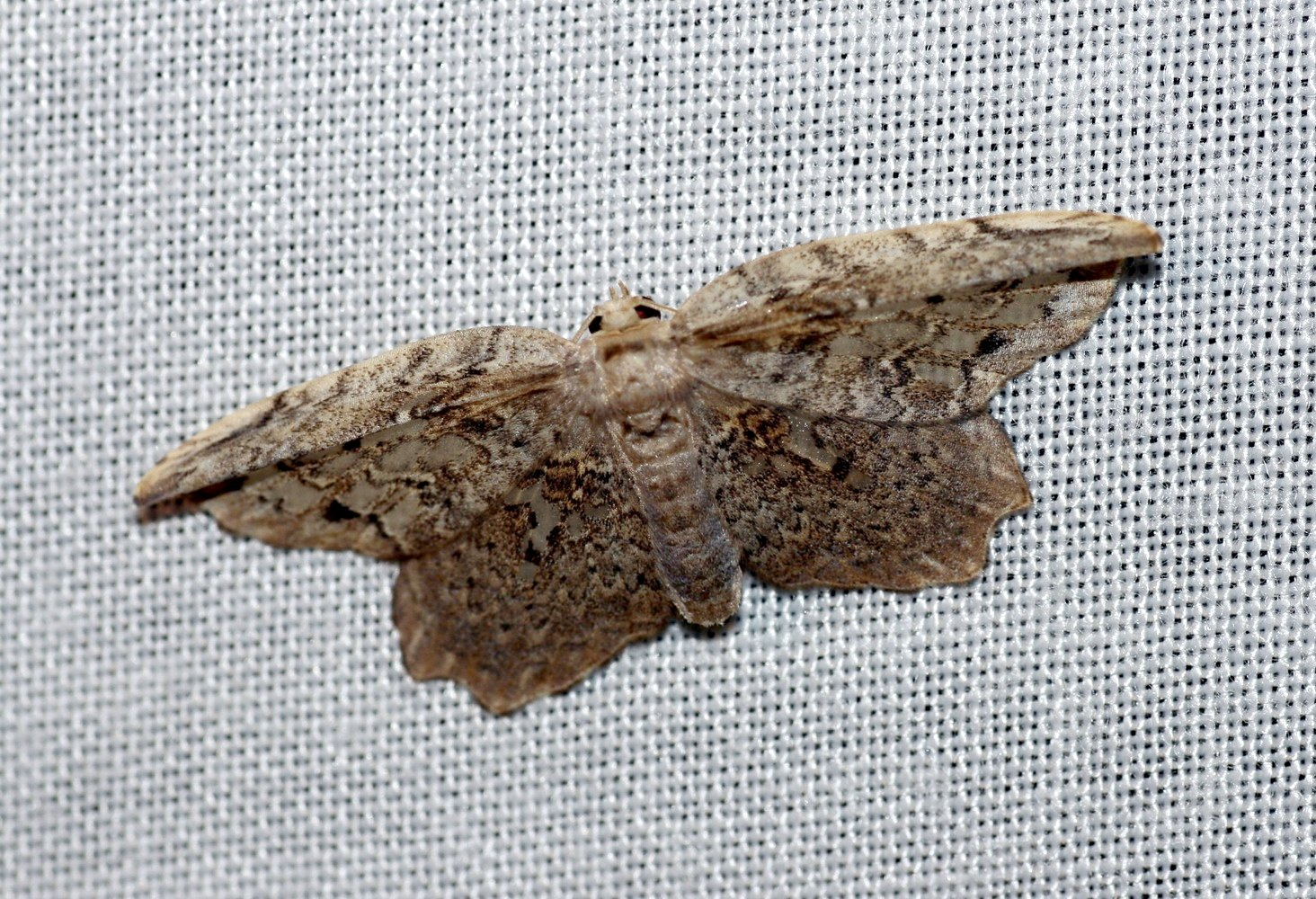

Scientific classification
- Kingdom: Animalia
- Phylum: Arthropoda
- Clade: Pancrustacea
- Class: Insecta
- Order: Lepidoptera
- Family: Drepanidae
- Genus: Pseuderosia
- Species: P. desmierdechenoni

Binomial name
- Pseuderosia desmierdechenoni Holloway, 1998

= Pseuderosia desmierdechenoni =

Species of hook-tip moth

Pseuderosia desmierdechenoni is a species of moth of the family Drepanidae. It is endemic to Sundaland.

The wingspan is 15–17 mm.

The larvae have been reared on Elaeis species.
