= Thymistida undilineata =

Scientific classification
- Kingdom: Animalia
- Phylum: Arthropoda
- Class: Insecta
- Order: Lepidoptera
- Family: Drepanidae
- Genus: Thymistida
- Species: T. undilineata

Binomial name
- Thymistida undilineata Warren, 1923

Species of hook-tip moth

Thymistida undilineata is a moth in the family Drepanidae. It was described by Warren in 1923. It is found in north-eastern India.
