= Argodrepana marilo =

Scientific classification
- Kingdom: Animalia
- Phylum: Arthropoda
- Clade: Pancrustacea
- Class: Insecta
- Order: Lepidoptera
- Family: Drepanidae
- Genus: Argodrepana
- Species: A. marilo

Binomial name
- Argodrepana marilo Wilkinson, 1970

Species of hook-tip moth

Argodrepana marilo is a moth in the family Drepanidae. It was described by Wilkinson in 1970. It is found in New Guinea.

The wingspan is 16.8-18.5 mm.
