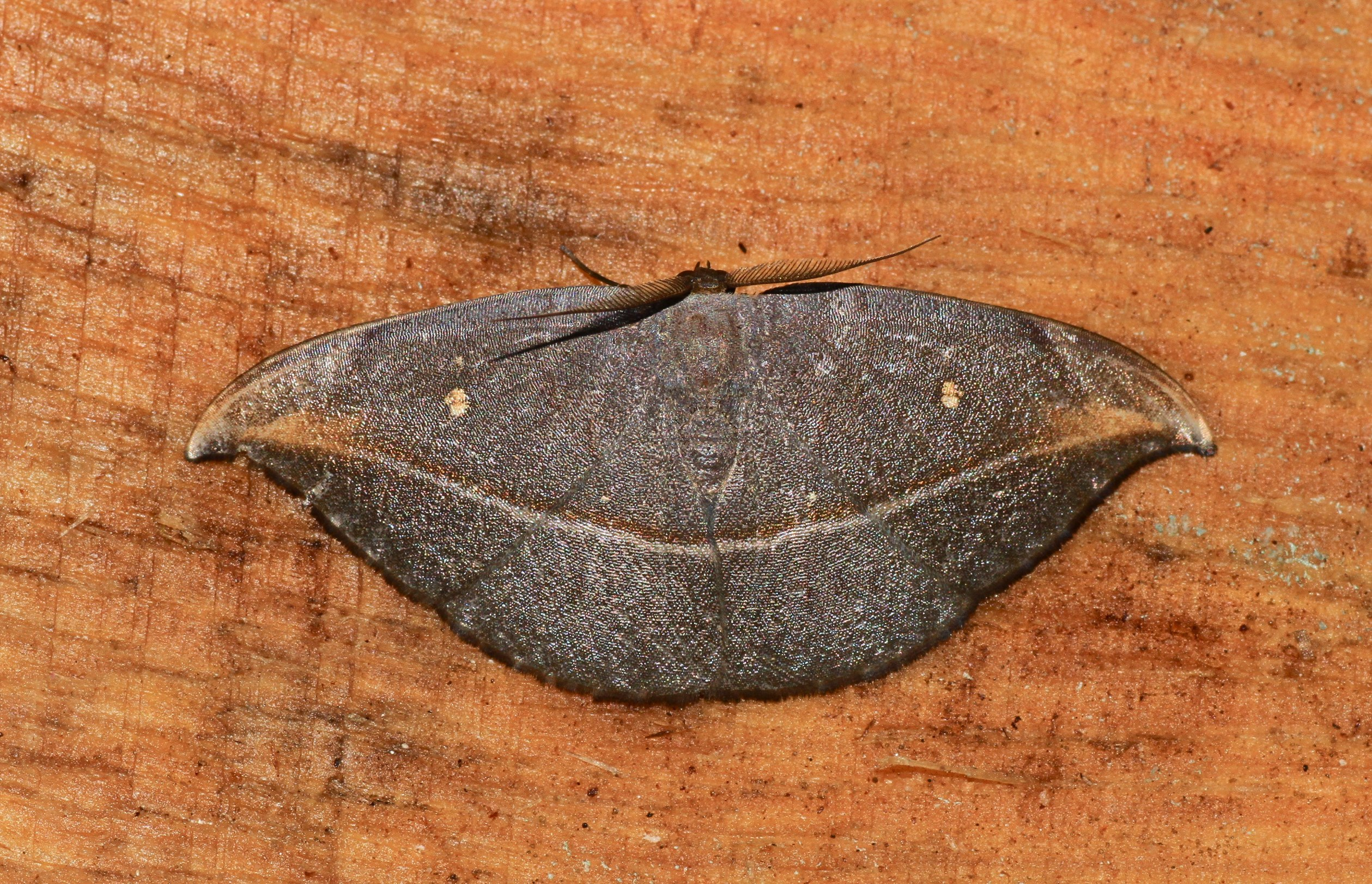

Scientific classification
- Domain: Eukaryota
- Kingdom: Animalia
- Phylum: Arthropoda
- Class: Insecta
- Order: Lepidoptera
- Family: Drepanidae
- Genus: Albara
- Species: A. hollowayi

Binomial name
- Albara hollowayi Watson, 1970

= Albara hollowayi =

Species of hook-tip moth

Albara hollowayi is a moth in the family Drepanidae. It was described by Watson in 1970. It is found in Taiwan and on Sumatra, Peninsular Malaysia and Borneo. The habitat consists of lowland forests, extending weakly into montane forests.
