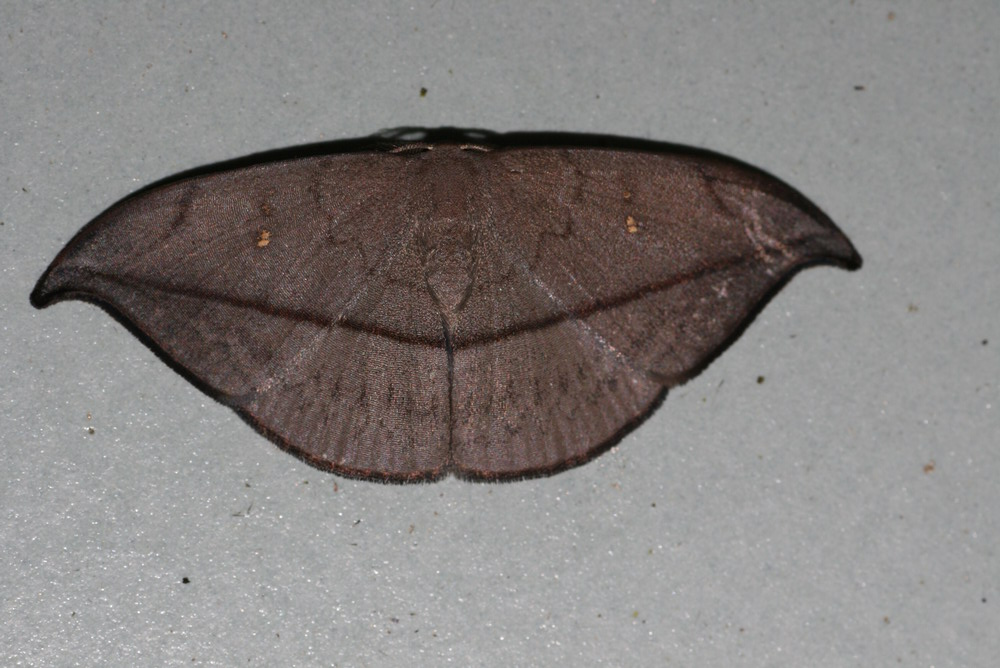

Scientific classification
- Kingdom: Animalia
- Phylum: Arthropoda
- Class: Insecta
- Order: Lepidoptera
- Family: Drepanidae
- Genus: Albara
- Species: A. reversaria

Binomial name
- Albara reversaria Walker, 1866

Synonyms
- Albara opalescens Warren, 1897; Albara griseotincta Wileman, 1914; Albara horishana Matsumura, 1921

= Albara reversaria =

Species of hook-tip moth

Albara reversaria is a moth of the family Drepanidae. It was described by Francis Walker in 1866. It is found in Sumatra, Borneo, Peninsular Malaysia, the north-eastern parts of the Himalaya and Taiwan.

== Subspecies ==
- Albara reversaria reversaria (Sumatra)
- Albara reversaria opalescens (north-eastern Himalaya (Khasis), China (Kwangtung, Linping), Taiwan)
