= Paralbara pallidinota =

Scientific classification
- Domain: Eukaryota
- Kingdom: Animalia
- Phylum: Arthropoda
- Class: Insecta
- Order: Lepidoptera
- Family: Drepanidae
- Genus: Paralbara
- Species: P. pallidinota

Binomial name
- Paralbara pallidinota Watson, 1968

Species of hook-tip moth

Paralbara pallidinota is a moth in the family Drepanidae. It was described by Watson in 1968. It is found in Yunnan, China.
