= Nidara marcus =

Scientific classification
- Domain: Eukaryota
- Kingdom: Animalia
- Phylum: Arthropoda
- Class: Insecta
- Order: Lepidoptera
- Family: Drepanidae
- Genus: Nidara
- Species: N. marcus

Binomial name
- Nidara marcus Watson, 1965

Species of hook-tip moth

Nidara marcus is a moth in the family Drepanidae. It was described by Watson in 1965. It is found in Madagascar.
