= Strepsigonia =

Scientific classification
- Domain: Eukaryota
- Kingdom: Animalia
- Phylum: Arthropoda
- Class: Insecta
- Order: Lepidoptera
- Family: Drepanidae
- Subfamily: Drepaninae
- Tribe: Drepanini
- Genus: Strepsigonia; Warren, 1897

Synonyms
- Monurodes Warren, 1923

Moth genus in family Drepanidae

Strepsigonia is a genus of moths belonging to the subfamily Drepaninae.

== Species ==
- Strepsigonia affinis Warren, 1897
- Strepsigonia kerbau Holloway, 1998
- Strepsigonia diluta (Warren, 1897)
- Strepsigonia nigrimaculata Warren, 1897
- Strepsigonia paludicola Holloway, 1998
- Strepsigonia placida (Swinhoe, 1902)
- Strepsigonia quadripunctata (Walker, 1862)
- Strepsigonia robusta Holloway, 1998
