= Streptoperas =

Scientific classification
- Domain: Eukaryota
- Kingdom: Animalia
- Phylum: Arthropoda
- Class: Insecta
- Order: Lepidoptera
- Family: Drepanidae
- Subfamily: Drepaninae
- Genus: Streptoperas; Hampson, 1895

Moth genus in family Drepanidae

Streptoperas is a genus of moths belonging to the subfamily Drepaninae.

== Species ==
- Streptoperas luteata Hampson, 1895
- Streptoperas crenelata Swinhoe, 1902
