= Oretopsis =

Scientific classification
- Kingdom: Animalia
- Phylum: Arthropoda
- Class: Insecta
- Order: Lepidoptera
- Family: Drepanidae
- Subfamily: Drepaninae
- Genus: Oretopsis; Watson, 1965
- Species: O. vohilava

Binomial name
- Oretopsis vohilava (Viette, 1954)

Synonyms
- Spidia vohilava Viette, 1954

Monotypic moth genus in family Drepanidae

Oretopsis is a genus of moths belonging to the subfamily Drepaninae. It contains the single species Oretopsis vohilava, described by Pierre Viette in 1954. It is found in Madagascar.
