= Hyalostola =

Scientific classification
- Domain: Eukaryota
- Kingdom: Animalia
- Phylum: Arthropoda
- Class: Insecta
- Order: Lepidoptera
- Family: Drepanidae
- Subfamily: Drepaninae
- Genus: Hyalostola; Hampson, 1914
- Species: H. phoenicochyta

Binomial name
- Hyalostola phoenicochyta Hampson, 1914

Monotypic moth genus in family Drepanidae

Hyalostola is a monotypic moth genus belonging to the subfamily Drepaninae first described by George Hampson in 1914. Its only species, Hyalostola phoenicochyta, described by the same author in the same year, is found on Borneo.

The wingspan is about 26 mm. The forewings are semi-hyaline white, irrorated (sprinkled) with rufous scales and tinged with purplish crimson to beyond the middle. There are traces of rufous postmedial line, oblique to vein 4 and then incurved. There are some rufous marks before the termen. The hindwings are semi-hyaline white, tinged with purplish crimson, and irrorated with some rufous scales. There are some diffused rufous marks on the termen.
