= Problepsidis =

Scientific classification
- Domain: Eukaryota
- Kingdom: Animalia
- Phylum: Arthropoda
- Class: Insecta
- Order: Lepidoptera
- Family: Drepanidae
- Subfamily: Drepaninae
- Genus: Problepsidis; Hampson, 1895
- Species: P. argyrialis

Binomial name
- Problepsidis argyrialis Hampson, 1895

Synonyms
- Problepsidis argyriatis Warren, 1922

Monotypic moth genus in family Drepanidae

Problepsidis is a monotypic moth genus in the family Drepanidae. Its only species, Problepsidis argyrialis, is found in India. The genus and species were described by George Hampson in 1895.
