= Uranometra =

Scientific classification
- Kingdom: Animalia
- Phylum: Arthropoda
- Class: Insecta
- Order: Lepidoptera
- Family: Drepanidae
- Subfamily: Drepaninae
- Genus: Uranometra; Bryk, 1913
- Species: U. oculata

Binomial name
- Uranometra oculata (Holland, 1893)

Synonyms
- Callidrepana oculata Holland, 1893; Uranometra diagonalis Bryk, 1913; Oreta sulphurea Hampson, 1914

Monotypic moth genus in family Drepanidae

Uranometra is a genus of moths belonging to the subfamily Drepaninae. It contains the single species Uranometra oculata, which is found in Cameroon, the Central African Republic, the Democratic Republic of Congo, Gabon, Ghana, Ivory Coast, Nigeria, Togo and Uganda.
