= Crucidava =

Scientific classification
- Kingdom: Animalia
- Phylum: Arthropoda
- Clade: Pancrustacea
- Class: Insecta
- Order: Lepidoptera
- Family: Drepanidae
- Subfamily: Thyatirinae
- Genus: Crucidava; Holloway, 1998
- Species: C. annulifera

Binomial name
- Crucidava annulifera Holloway, 1998

Monotypic moth genus in family Drepanidae

Crucidava is a monotypic moth genus first described by Jeremy Daniel Holloway in 1998 belonging to the subfamily Drepaninae. It contains the species Crucidava annulifera, described by the same author in the same year, which is found on Borneo and possibly Peninsular Malaysia. The habitat consists of lower montane forests.
