= Astatochroa =

Scientific classification
- Domain: Eukaryota
- Kingdom: Animalia
- Phylum: Arthropoda
- Class: Insecta
- Order: Lepidoptera
- Superfamily: Drepanoidea
- Family: Drepanidae
- Subfamily: Drepaninae
- Tribe: Oretini
- Genus: Astatochroa; Turner, 1926

Moth genus in family Drepanidae

Astatochroa is a genus of moths belonging to the subfamily Drepaninae.

== Species ==
- Astatochroa fuscimargo (Warren, 1896)
- Astatochroa sulphurata (Warren, 1907)
