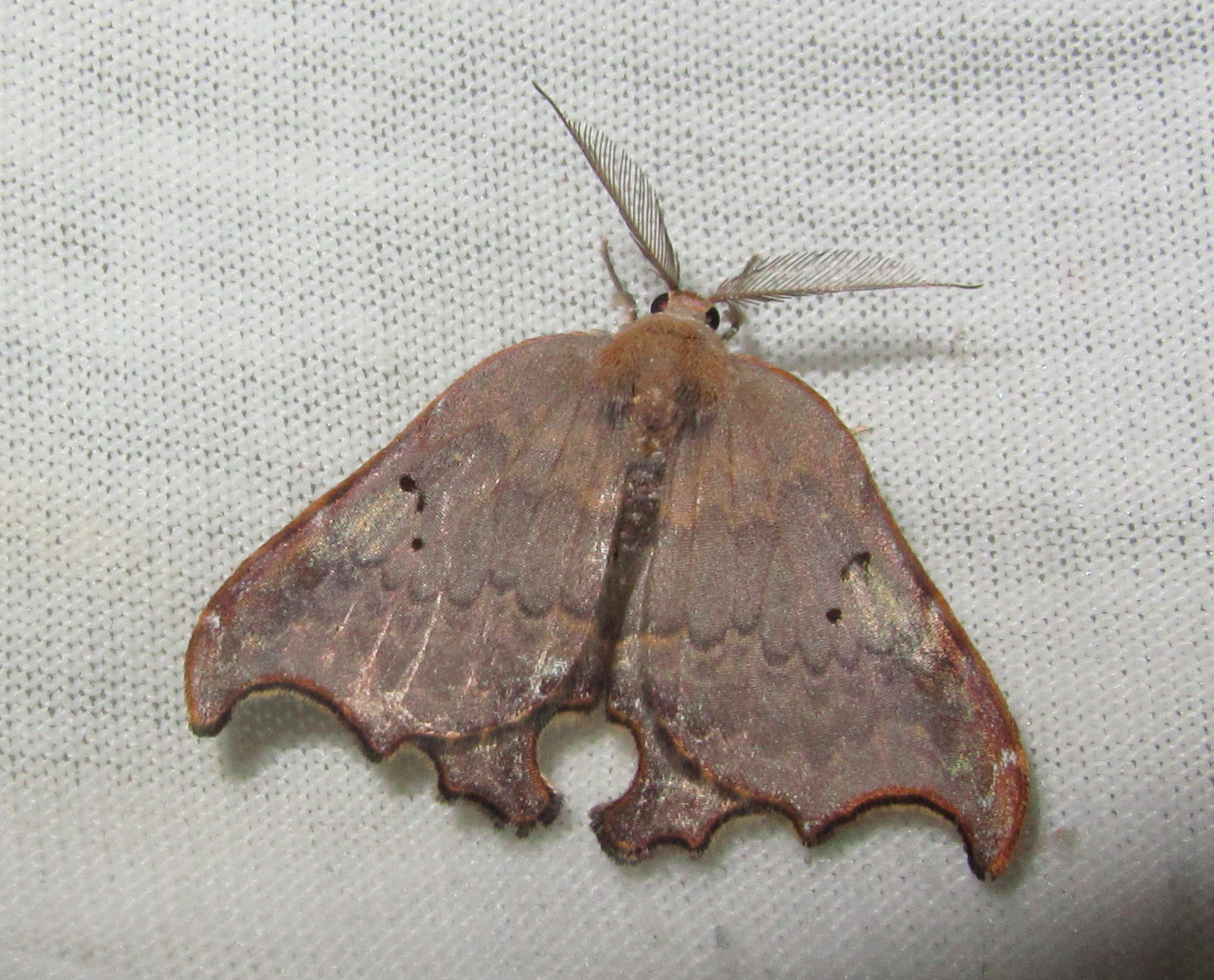
- Thymistida tripunctata

Scientific classification
- Domain: Eukaryota
- Kingdom: Animalia
- Phylum: Arthropoda
- Class: Insecta
- Order: Lepidoptera
- Family: Drepanidae
- Subfamily: Drepaninae
- Genus: Thymistida; Walker, 1865

Synonyms
- Hybodrepana Bryk, 1943

= Thymistida =

Moth genus in family Drepanidae

Thymistida is a genus of moths belonging to the subfamily Drepaninae. It was erected by Francis Walker in 1865

== Species ==
- Thymistida nigritincta Warren, 1923
- Thymistida tripunctata Walker, 1865
- Thymistida undilineata Warren, 1923
