= Pseudemodesa =

Scientific classification
- Domain: Eukaryota
- Kingdom: Animalia
- Phylum: Arthropoda
- Class: Insecta
- Order: Lepidoptera
- Family: Drepanidae
- Subfamily: Drepaninae
- Genus: Pseudemodesa; Warren, 1899
- Species: P. plenicornis

Binomial name
- Pseudemodesa plenicornis Warren, 1899

Synonyms
- Pseudemodesa fuscidisca Warren, 1901

Monotypic moth genus in family Drepanidae

Pseudemodesa plenicornis is a moth in the family Drepanidae and the only species in the genus Pseudemodesa. It was described by Warren in 1899. It is found on the Louisiade Archipelago.

The wingspan is about 21 mm. The forewings are silky white, with ochreous fuscous lines. The antemedian and postmedian lines are wavy and denticulated and there is a fuscous mark on the discocellular between them, traversed by an undefined dark line. There is a double submarginal row of ochreous lunules and the costa is slightly dusted with fuscous. The hindwings are like the forewings, but the discocellular is not marked.
