= Scytalopteryx =

Scientific classification
- Kingdom: Animalia
- Phylum: Arthropoda
- Class: Insecta
- Order: Lepidoptera
- Family: Drepanidae
- Subfamily: Drepaninae
- Genus: Scytalopteryx; Ritsema, 1890
- Species: S. elongata

Binomial name
- Scytalopteryx elongata (Snellen, 1889)

Synonyms
- Phyllopteryx Snellen, 1889 (preocc. Swainson, 1839); Phyllopteryx elongata Snellen, 1889

Monotypic moth genus in family Drepanidae

Scytalopteryx is a monotypic moth genus belonging to the subfamily Drepaninae first described by Ritsema in 1889. It contains the species Scytalopteryx elongata, described by Snellen in 1889, which is found in Sundaland.

The larvae feed on Cocos, Elaeis, Coffea and Lablab species.
