= Dipriodonta =

Scientific classification
- Domain: Eukaryota
- Kingdom: Animalia
- Phylum: Arthropoda
- Class: Insecta
- Order: Lepidoptera
- Family: Drepanidae
- Subfamily: Drepaninae
- Genus: Dipriodonta; Warren, 1897
- Species: D. sericea

Binomial name
- Dipriodonta sericea Warren, 1897

Synonyms
- Macrocilix sericea

Monotypic moth genus in family Drepanidae

Dipriodonta is a monotypic genus of moths belonging to the subfamily Drepaninae and contains Dipriodonta sericea as only species, which is found in India (Khasia Hills).

The wingspan is 21 mm. The forewings are silky white with two faint brown lines near the base, strongly curved in the cell. There is a waved brown line from the costa before the middle to the inner margin before the middle, distinct below the median. There is a similar outer line from two-thirds of the costa to three-fourths of the inner margin. There is a brown shade on the costa beyond it, forming two dark lunules and dots between veins 2 and 4, and a dot on the inner margin. A grey marginal shade rises from two black subapical dots and there are some black specks at the apex, as well as a black spot at the base of the discocellular, and a minute dot on the inner margin close to the base. The hindwings have a faint median line, a double grey postmedian, the outer arm marked with black dots on the veins. There is also a single curved submarginal line and a minute black dot at the lower end of the cell.
