= Gonoreta =

Scientific classification
- Domain: Eukaryota
- Kingdom: Animalia
- Phylum: Arthropoda
- Class: Insecta
- Order: Lepidoptera
- Family: Drepanidae
- Subfamily: Drepaninae
- Genus: Gonoreta; Warren, 1902

Synonyms
- Lomadontophana Bryk, 1913'

Moth genus in family Drepanidae

Gonoreta is a genus of moths first described by Warren in 1902. It is in the subfamily Drepaninae.

Some species are known as defoliators of coffee plants (Rubiaceae).

Type species: Gonoreta ansorgei Warren, 1902

== Some species of this genus are ==
- Gonoreta albiapex Watson, 1965
- Gonoreta angulosa Watson, 1965
- Gonoreta bispina Watson, 1965
- Gonoreta contracta (Warren, 1897)
- Gonoreta cymba Watson, 1965
- Gonoreta differenciata (Bryk, 1913)
- Gonoreta forcipulata Watson, 1965
- Gonoreta gonioptera (Hampson, 1914)
- Gonoreta opacifinis Watson, 1965
- Gonoreta subtilis (Bryk, 1913)
