= Crocinis =

Scientific classification
- Domain: Eukaryota
- Kingdom: Animalia
- Phylum: Arthropoda
- Class: Insecta
- Order: Lepidoptera
- Family: Drepanidae
- Subfamily: Drepaninae
- Genus: Crocinis; Butler, 1879

Type species
- Crocinis fenestrata Butler, 1879

Synonyms
- Drapena Gaede, 1927

Moth genus in the family Drepanidae

Crocinis is a genus of moths from Madagascar belonging to the subfamily Drepaninae. The genus was erected by Arthur Gardiner Butler in 1879.

== Species ==
- Crocinis boboa Watson, 1965
- Crocinis canescens Watson, 1965
- Crocinis felina Watson, 1965
- Crocinis fenestrata Butler, 1879
- Crocinis imaitsoana Watson, 1965
- Crocinis licina Watson, 1965
- Crocinis prolixa Watson, 1965
- Crocinis spicata Watson, 1965
- Crocinis tetrathyra (Mabille, 1900)
- Crocinis viettei Watson, 1965
