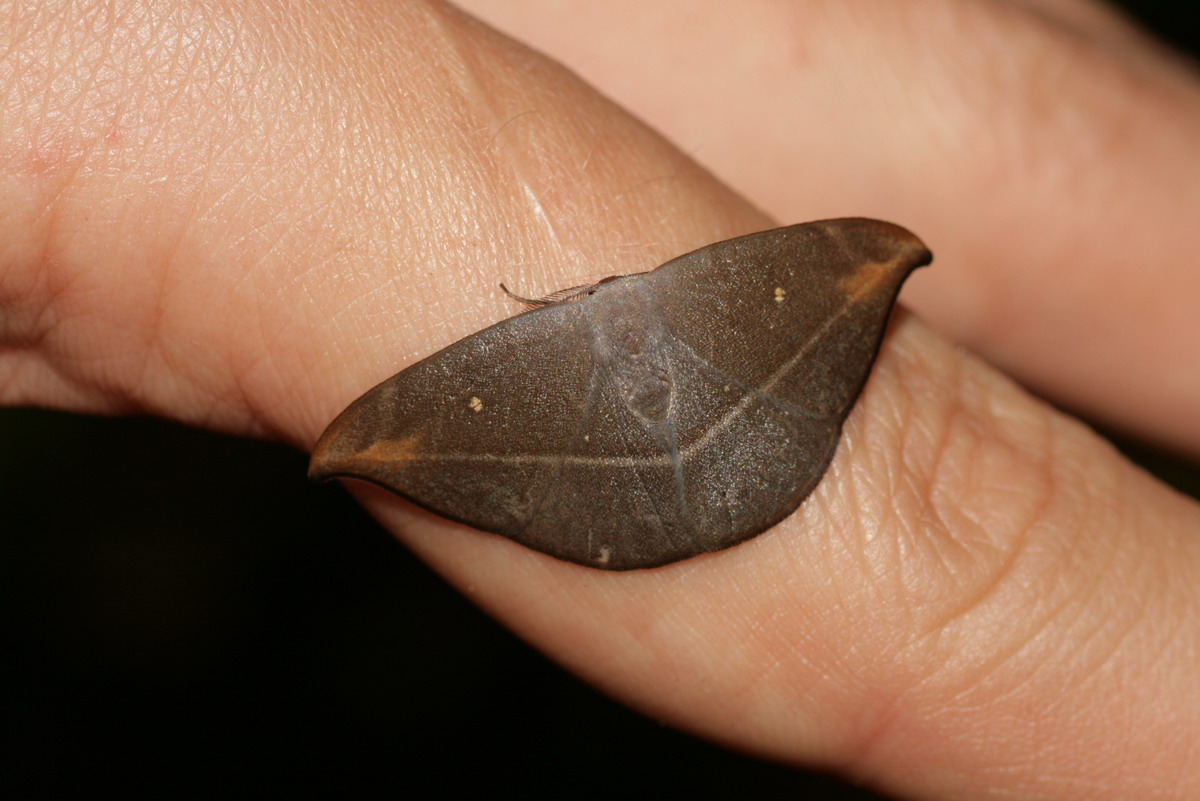
- Albara reversaria

Scientific classification
- Domain: Eukaryota
- Kingdom: Animalia
- Phylum: Arthropoda
- Class: Insecta
- Order: Lepidoptera
- Family: Drepanidae
- Subfamily: Drepaninae
- Genus: Albara; Walker, 1866

= Albara =

Moth genus in family Drepanidae

Albara is a genus of moths belonging to the subfamily Drepaninae. The genus has an Asian distribution, with Albara reversaria occurring in India, Indonesia, China and Taiwan, and Albara hollowayi known from Indonesia and peninsular Malaysia.

== Species ==
- Albara reversaria Walker, 1866
- Albara hollowayi Watson, 1970

== Former species ==
- Albara flava (Moore, 1879), now Tridrepana flava (Moore, 1879)
