= Zusidava =

Scientific classification
- Kingdom: Animalia
- Phylum: Arthropoda
- Class: Insecta
- Order: Lepidoptera
- Family: Drepanidae
- Subfamily: Drepaninae
- Genus: Zusidava; Walker, [1863]

Synonyms
- Emodesa Moore, 1888

Moth genus in family Drepanidae

Zusidava is a genus of moths belonging to the subfamily Drepaninae.

== Species ==
- Zusidava serratilinea (Wileman, 1917)
- Zusidava sinuosa (Moore, 1888)
- Zusidava tortricaria Walker, [1863]
