= Spectroreta =

Scientific classification
- Kingdom: Animalia
- Phylum: Arthropoda
- Class: Insecta
- Order: Lepidoptera
- Family: Drepanidae
- Tribe: Oretini
- Genus: Spectroreta; Warren, 1903
- Species: S. hyalodisca

Binomial name
- Spectroreta hyalodisca Hampson, 1896

Synonyms
- Spectroreta fenestra Chu & Wang, 1987; Oreta hyalodisca Hampson, 1896

Monotypic moth genus in family Drepanidae

Spectroreta is a monotypic moth genus belonging to subfamily Drepaninae erected by Warren in 1903. Its only species, Spectroreta hyalodisca, was described by George Hampson in 1896.

It is found in Sri Lanka, the north-eastern Himalayas, China (Zhejiang, Fujian, Jiangxi, Guangdong, Guangxi), Myanmar, Peninsular Malaysia and on Sumatra, Borneo and the Kei Islands.

The wingspan is about 34 mm. The forewings are red brown, variegated with yellow brown on the apical area and a large irregular hyaline yellow patch in and below the end of the cell on the disc, running out to a point between veins 4 and 5 and with a small spot at its inner edge. There is an oblique dark submarginal line and an oblique shade from the apex, as well as some yellow spots on the margin and some black suffusion near the angle. The hindwings are chestnut, slightly variegated with yellow-brown. There is a medial dark line with a minute yellow-ringed black ocellus beyond the middle and there is some yellow on the margin at the angle.

== Former species ==
- Spectroreta thumba D.Y. Xin & X. Wang, 2011 (now Amphitorna brunhyala)
