= Nidara =

Scientific classification
- Kingdom: Animalia
- Phylum: Arthropoda
- Class: Insecta
- Order: Lepidoptera
- Family: Drepanidae
- Subfamily: Drepaninae
- Tribe: Nidarini
- Genus: Nidara; Mabille, 1898

Type species
- Nidara croceina Mabille, 1898

Moth genus in family Drepanidae

Nidara is a genus of moths belonging to the subfamily Drepaninae from Madagascar.

== Species ==
- Nidara calligola Watson, 1965
- Nidara croceina Mabille, 1898
- Nidara marcus Watson, 1965
- Nidara multiversa Watson, 1965
- Nidara pumilla Watson, 1965
