= Streptoperas luteata =

Scientific classification
- Kingdom: Animalia
- Phylum: Arthropoda
- Class: Insecta
- Order: Lepidoptera
- Family: Drepanidae
- Genus: Streptoperas
- Species: S. luteata

Binomial name
- Streptoperas luteata Hampson, 1895

Species of hook-tip moth

Streptoperas luteata is a moth in the family Drepanidae. It was described by George Hampson in 1895. It is found in the north-eastern Himalayas and on Borneo, Sumatra, Java, Bali and Sulawesi.

The wingspan is about 44 mm. Adults are yellow, suffused and irrorated (sprinkled) with red brown, the forewings with an indistinct antemedial line which is highly angled in the cell. There are two specks at the end of the cell and the inner margin is more yellow and crossed by numerous indistinct waved rufous lines. There is also a waved submarginal line and some white subapical spots. The hindwings have a yellow subbasal area, crossed by waved rufous lines and there is a black speck at the end of the cell, as well as a double postmedial line. The area beyond it is yellow, crossed by waved rufous lines. There is a more distinct submarginal waved line and a rufous marginal band from vein 3 to the anal angle.
