= Paralbara =

Scientific classification
- Domain: Eukaryota
- Kingdom: Animalia
- Phylum: Arthropoda
- Class: Insecta
- Order: Lepidoptera
- Family: Drepanidae
- Subfamily: Drepaninae
- Genus: Paralbara; Watson, 1968

Moth genus in family Drepanidae

Paralbara is a genus of moths belonging to the subfamily Drepaninae.

== Species ==
- Paralbara muscularia Walker, 1866
- Paralbara achlyscarleta Chu & Wang
- Paralbara perhamata Hampson, 1892
- Paralbara spicula Watson, 1968
- Paralbara pallidinota Watson, 1968
- Paralbara watsoni Holloway, 1976
