= Hemiphruda =

Scientific classification
- Kingdom: Animalia
- Phylum: Arthropoda
- Clade: Pancrustacea
- Class: Insecta
- Order: Lepidoptera
- Family: Drepanidae
- Subfamily: Drepaninae
- Genus: Hemiphruda; Warren, 1923 in Seitz, 1923
- Species: H. mecasa

Binomial name
- Hemiphruda mecasa (Swinhoe, 1894)

Synonyms
- Drepana mecasa Swinhoe, 1894

Monotypic moth genus in family Drepanidae

Hemiphruda is a monotypic genus of moths in the family Drepanidae. The sole species is Hemiphruda mecasa. It is only known from Cherrapunji in Meghalaya, Northeastern India.

The wingspan is 41 mm (1 6/10 in) for males. Adults are brown, the forewings with two black spots at the end of the cell, one at the upper end and the other below. There is a diffuse band from the apex of the fore wings to the abdomen. The hindwings have a straight band of three thick brown lines, but not very distinct.
