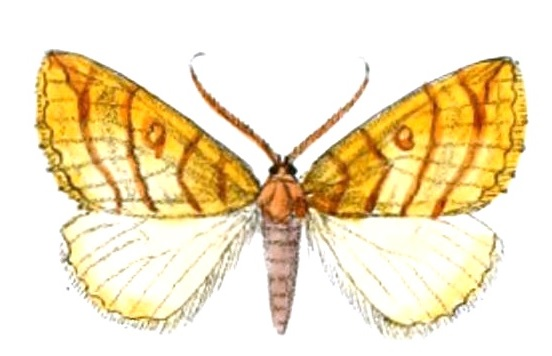
- Spica luteola

Scientific classification
- Domain: Eukaryota
- Kingdom: Animalia
- Phylum: Arthropoda
- Class: Insecta
- Order: Lepidoptera
- Family: Drepanidae
- Subfamily: Thyatirinae
- Genus: Spica; Swinhoe, 1889

Synonyms
- Plusinia Gaede, 1930

= Spica (moth) =

Moth genus in family Drepanidae

Spica is a genus of moths belonging to the subfamily Thyatirinae of the Drepanidae.

== Species ==
- Spica luteola Swinhoe, 1889
- Spica parallelangula Alphéraky, 1893
