= Epicampoptera =

Scientific classification
- Kingdom: Animalia
- Phylum: Arthropoda
- Class: Insecta
- Order: Lepidoptera
- Family: Drepanidae
- Subfamily: Drepaninae
- Genus: Epicampoptera; Bryk, 1913

Synonyms
- Metadrepana Hampson, 1914

Moth genus in family Drepanidae

Epicampoptera is a genus of moths in the family Drepanidae. The genus was first described by Felix Bryk in 1913.

They are defoliators of coffee plants (Rubiaceae) and the species are difficult to determine by sight.

Type species: Epicampoptera erosa (Holland, 1893)

== Some species of this genus are ==
- Epicampoptera andersoni (Tams, 1925)
- Epicampoptera carnea (Saalmüller, 1884)
- Epicampoptera difficilis Hering, 1934
- Epicampoptera efulena Watson, 1965
- Epicampoptera erosa (Holland, 1893)
- Epicampoptera graciosa Watson, 1965
- Epicampoptera griveaudi Watson, 1965
- Epicampoptera heringi Gaede, 1927
- Epicampoptera heterogyna (Hampson, 1914)
- Epicampoptera ivoirensis Watson, 1965
- Epicampoptera marantica (Tams, 1930)
- Epicampoptera notialis Watson, 1965
- Epicampoptera pallida (Tams, 1925)
- Epicampoptera robusta Watson, 1965
- Epicampoptera seydeli Watson, 1965
- Epicampoptera strandi Bryk, 1913
- Epicampoptera tamsi Watson, 1965
- Epicampoptera tumidula Watson, 1965
