= Pseudalbara =

Scientific classification
- Kingdom: Animalia
- Phylum: Arthropoda
- Class: Insecta
- Order: Lepidoptera
- Family: Drepanidae
- Subfamily: Drepaninae
- Genus: Pseudalbara; Inoue, 1962

Moth genus in family Drepanidae

Pseudalbara is a genus of moths belonging to the subfamily Drepaninae.

== Species ==
- Pseudalbara parvula (Leech, 1890)
- Pseudalbara fuscifascia Watson, 1968
