= Paralbara perhamata =

Scientific classification
- Kingdom: Animalia
- Phylum: Arthropoda
- Class: Insecta
- Order: Lepidoptera
- Family: Drepanidae
- Genus: Paralbara
- Species: P. perhamata

Binomial name
- Paralbara perhamata (Hampson, 1892)

Synonyms
- Drepana perhamata Hampson, [1893]; Albara perhamata

Species of hook-tip moth

Paralbara perhamata is a moth in the family Drepanidae. It was described by George Hampson in 1892. It is found in Northeast India including Sikkim and in Borneo.

The wingspan is about 42 mm. The forewings have a broad purplish-fuscous medial band with waved edges. There is an indistinct waved postmedial line and the outer area is suffused with fuscous. The hindwings have a fuscous basal area with a waved outer edge. There are two pale specks at the end of the cell and an indistinct waved postmedial line.

== Subspecies ==
- Paralbara perhamata perhamata (India)
- Paralbara perhamata sinuosa Holloway, 1976 (Borneo)
