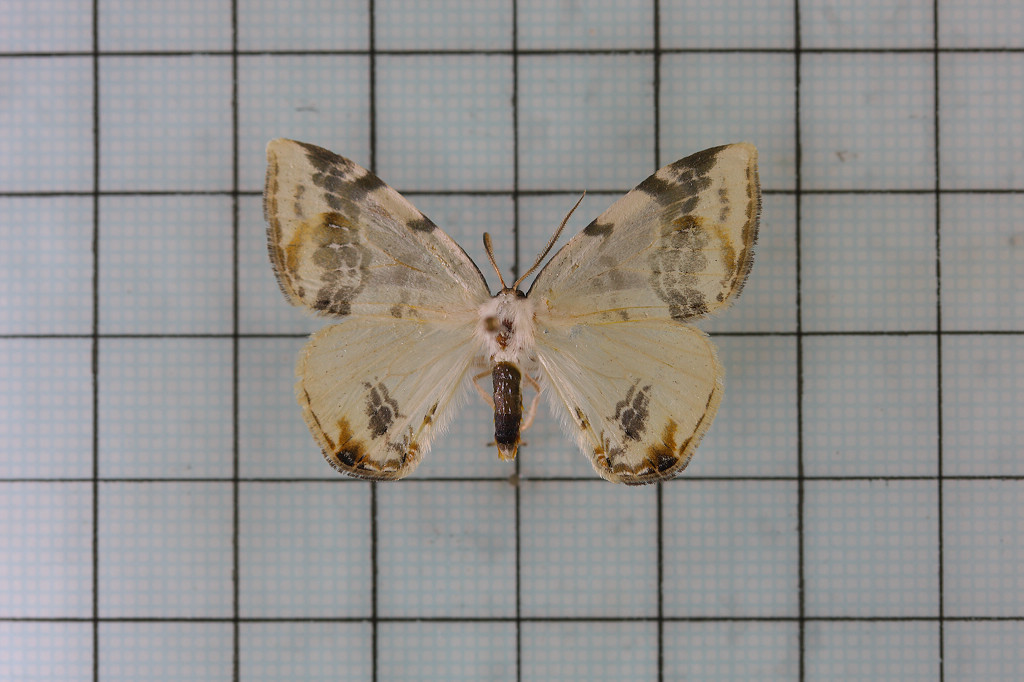

Scientific classification
- Domain: Eukaryota
- Kingdom: Animalia
- Phylum: Arthropoda
- Class: Insecta
- Order: Lepidoptera
- Family: Drepanidae
- Subfamily: Drepaninae
- Genus: Sewa; Swinhoe, 1900

= Sewa (moth) =

Moth genus in family Drepanidae

Sewa is a genus of moths belonging to the subfamily Drepaninae. The genus was first described by Swinhoe in 1900.

== Species ==
- Sewa orbiferata (Walker, 1862)
- Sewa taiwana (Wileman, 1911)
