= Monoprista =

Scientific classification
- Kingdom: Animalia
- Phylum: Arthropoda
- Clade: Pancrustacea
- Class: Insecta
- Order: Lepidoptera
- Family: Drepanidae
- Subfamily: Drepaninae
- Genus: Monoprista; Warren, 1923 in Seitz, 1923
- Species: M. nudobia

Binomial name
- Monoprista nudobia (Swinhoe, 1894)

Synonyms
- Phalacra nudobia Swinhoe, 1894; Leucodrepana nudobia

Monotypic moth genus in family Drepanidae

Monoprista is a monotypic genus of moths in the family Drepanidae. The sole species is Monoprista nudobia. It is only known from Cherrapunji in Meghalaya, Northeast India.

The wingspan is 30–36 mm (1 2/10–1 4/10 in). Adults are olive-brown with two black spots at the end of each cell. The forewings have two brown indistinct bands, one from the base subcostal, the other from the middle of the hindmargin to the apex. The hindwings have a central brown band, limited inwardly by a brown line, above which is a broad ochreous band.
