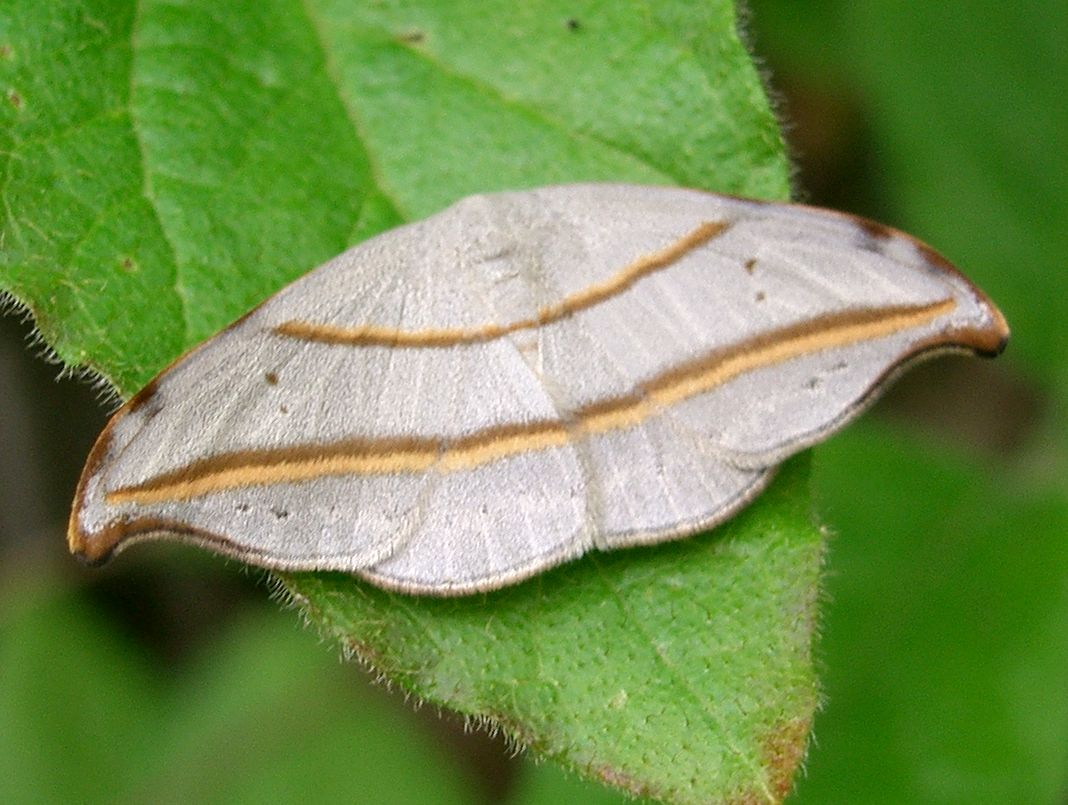
- Nordstromia japonica

Scientific classification
- Kingdom: Animalia
- Phylum: Arthropoda
- Clade: Pancrustacea
- Class: Insecta
- Order: Lepidoptera
- Family: Drepanidae
- Subfamily: Drepaninae; Boisduval, 1828

Genera
- See text

Synonyms
- Oretinae Inoue, 1962

= Drepaninae =

Subfamily of hook-tip moths

Drepaninae are by far the largest subfamily of the Drepanidae moths. While it is usually split into two tribes, Drepanini and Oretini, its internal systematics and phylogeny are not well resolved.

== Systematics ==
The following list is provisional and probably incomplete.

- Tribe Drepanini Meyrick, 1895
  - Agnidra - includes Zanclalbara
  - Argodrepana
  - Auzata - includes Gonocilix
  - Auzatellodes
  - Canucha - includes Campylopteryx
  - Drapetodes
  - Drepana
  - Euphalacra - includes Ectothyris, Neophalacra
  - Hyalospectra
  - Leucoblepsis
  - Macrocilix
  - Nordstromia - includes Allodrepana
  - Strepsigonia - includes Monurodes
  - Tridrepana - includes Konjikia
- Tribe Nidarini
  - Nidara
- Tribe Oretini Inoue, 1962
  - Amphitorna - includes Neoreta, Procampsis, Tomocerota
  - Astatochroa
  - Oreta - includes Dryopteris, Holoreta, Hypsomadius, Mimoreta, Oretella, Psiloreta, Rhamphoreta
  - Spectroreta
  - Urogonodes
- Unplaced to tribe

- Albara
- Callicilix
- Callidrepana - includes Ausaris, Damna, Drepanulides, Drepanulina, Ticilia
- Cilix
- Crocinis
- Crucidava
- Deroca
- Didymana
- Dipriodonta
- Ditrigona - includes Leucodrepana, Leucodrepanilla
- Epicampoptera
- Eudeilinia
- Falcaria - includes Edapteryx
- Gogana - includes Ametroptila, Liocrops, Trotothyris
- Gonoreta
- Gonoretodes
- Hemiphruda
- Hyalostola
- Isospidia
- Macrauzata
- Microblepsis - includes Betalbara
- Monoprista
- Negera
- Oretopsis
- Paralbara
- Phalacra
- Problepsidis
- Pseudalbara
- Pseuderosia
- Pseudemodesa
- Sabra
- Scytalopteryx
- Sewa
- Spidia
- Streptoperas
- Teldenia
- Thymistadopsis
- Thymistida - includes Hybodrepana, Thymistada
- Uranometra
- Zusidava - includes Emodesa
