= Urogonodes =

Scientific classification
- Kingdom: Animalia
- Phylum: Arthropoda
- Class: Insecta
- Order: Lepidoptera
- Family: Drepanidae
- Subfamily: Drepaninae
- Tribe: Oretini
- Genus: Urogonodes; Warren, 1903

Moth genus in family Drepanidae

Urogonodes is a genus of moths belonging to the subfamily Drepaninae.

== Species ==
- Urogonodes astralaina Wilkinson, 1972
- Urogonodes clinala Wilkinson, 1972
- Urogonodes macrura Warren, 1923
- Urogonodes patiens Warren, 1906
- Urogonodes scintillans Warren, 1896

== Former species ==
- Urogonodes cervina Warren, 1923
- Urogonodes colorata Warren, 1907
- Urogonodes flavida Warren, 1907
- Urogonodes flaviplaga Warren, 1923
- Urogonodes fumosa Warren, 1923
- Urogonodes praecisa Warren, 1923
