= Zusidava tortricaria =

Scientific classification
- Kingdom: Animalia
- Phylum: Arthropoda
- Clade: Pancrustacea
- Class: Insecta
- Order: Lepidoptera
- Family: Drepanidae
- Genus: Zusidava
- Species: Z. tortricaria

Binomial name
- Zusidava tortricaria Walker, [1863]

Species of hook-tip moth

Zusidava tortricaria is a moth in the family Drepanidae. It was described by Francis Walker in 1863. It is found on Borneo.
