= Habrona =

Betapsestis

Scientific classification
- Domain: Eukaryota
- Kingdom: Animalia
- Phylum: Arthropoda
- Class: Insecta
- Order: Lepidoptera
- Family: Drepanidae
- Subfamily: Thyatirinae
- Genus: Habrona; Bethune-Baker, 1908

Synonyms
- Cymotrix Gaede, in Seitz 1930

Moth genus in family Drepanidae

Habrona is a genus of moths belonging to the subfamily Thyatirinae of the Drepanidae.

== Species ==
- Habrona alboplagata Bethune-Baker, 1908
- Habrona brunnea Bethune-Baker, 1908
- Habrona caerulescens Warren, 1915
- Habrona concinna Warren, 1915
- Habrona marmorata Warren, 1915
- Habrona papuata (Warren, 1915)
