= Argodrepana =

Scientific classification
- Kingdom: Animalia
- Phylum: Arthropoda
- Clade: Pancrustacea
- Class: Insecta
- Order: Lepidoptera
- Family: Drepanidae
- Subfamily: Drepaninae
- Tribe: Drepanini
- Genus: Argodrepana; Wilkinson, 1967

Moth genus in family Drepanidae

Argodrepana is a genus of moths belonging to the subfamily Drepaninae.

== Species ==
- Argodrepana verticata Warren, 1907
- Argodrepana galbana Wilkinson, 1967
- Argodrepana auratifrons Warren, 1922
- Argodrepana denticulata Wilkinson, 1967
- Argodrepana tenebra Wilkinson, 1967
- Argodrepana umbrosa Wilkinson, 1967
- Argodrepana marilo Wilkinson, 1970
