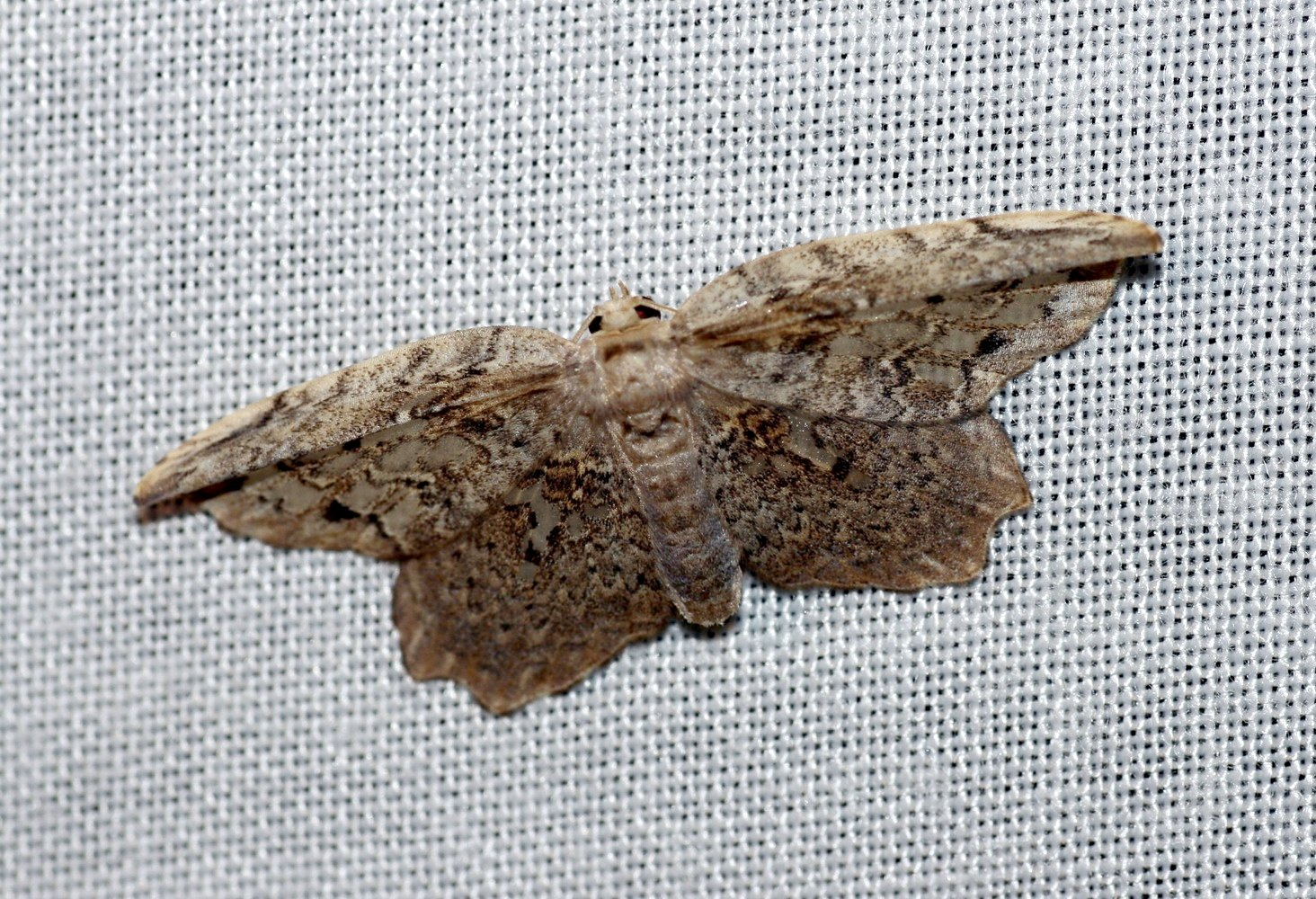

Scientific classification
- Domain: Eukaryota
- Kingdom: Animalia
- Phylum: Arthropoda
- Class: Insecta
- Order: Lepidoptera
- Family: Drepanidae
- Subfamily: Drepaninae
- Tribe: Drepanini
- Genus: Euphalacra; Warren, 1897

Synonyms
- Ectothyris Swinhoe, 1902; Neophalacra Roepke, 1951

= Euphalacra =

Moth genus in family Drepanidae

Euphalacra is a genus of moths belonging to the subfamily Drepaninae.

== Species ==
- Euphalacra discipuncta Holloway, 1976
- Euphalacra lacunata Holloway, 1998
- Euphalacra nigridorsata Warren, 1897
- Euphalacra nigridorsoides Holloway, 1998
- Euphalacra postmediangulata Holloway, 1998
- Euphalacra semisecta Warren, 1922
- Euphalacra trifenestrata Swinhoe, 1902
