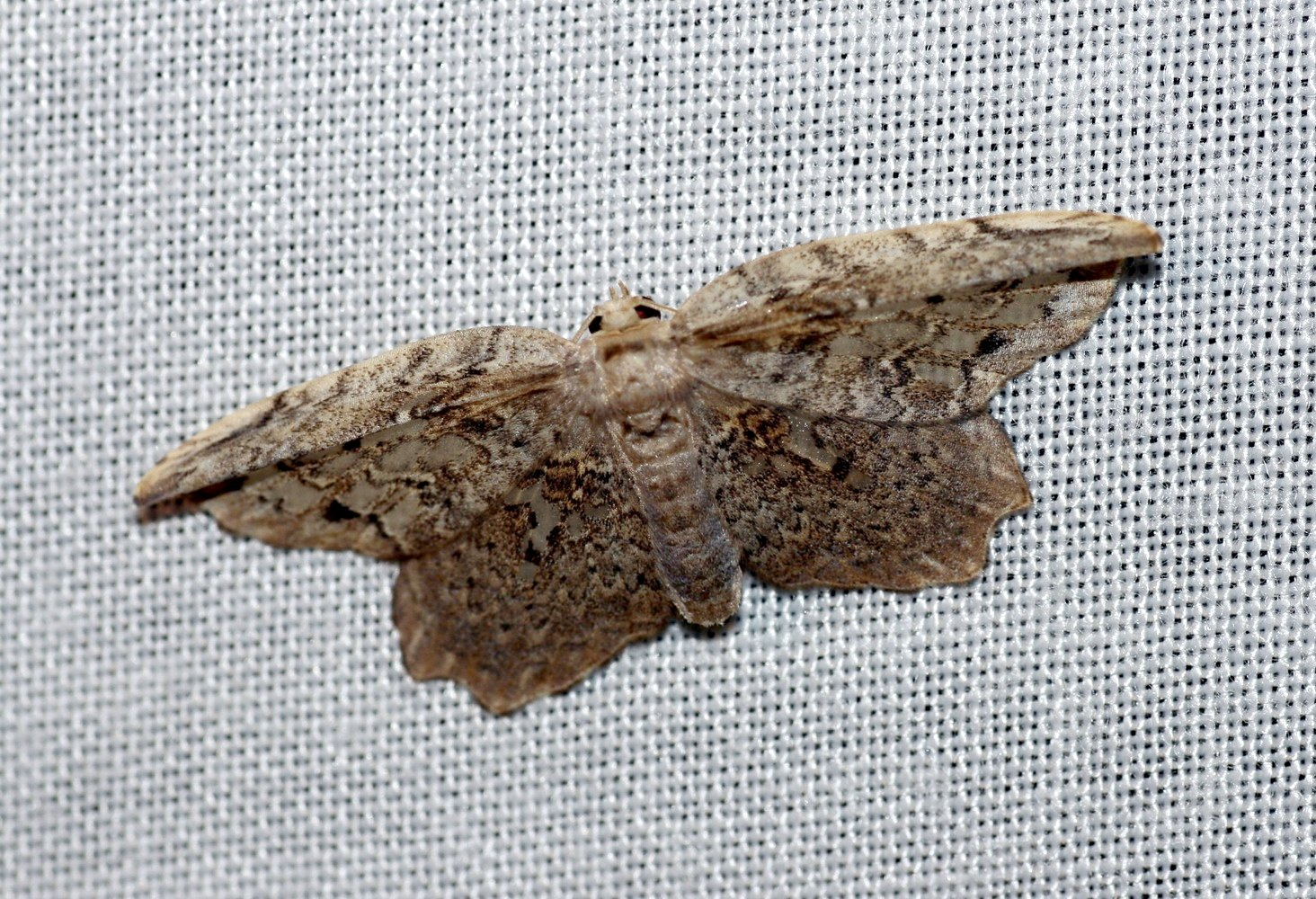
- Pseuderosia desmierdechenoni

Scientific classification
- Domain: Eukaryota
- Kingdom: Animalia
- Phylum: Arthropoda
- Class: Insecta
- Order: Lepidoptera
- Family: Drepanidae
- Subfamily: Drepaninae
- Genus: Pseuderosia; Snellen, 1889

= Pseuderosia =

Moth genus in family Drepanidae

Pseuderosia is a genus of moths belonging to the subfamily Drepaninae.

== Species ==
- Pseuderosia cristata Snellen, 1889
- Pseuderosia desmierdechenoni Holloway, 1998
- Pseuderosia humiliata (Walker, 1861)
