= Eudeilinia =

Scientific classification
- Domain: Eukaryota
- Kingdom: Animalia
- Phylum: Arthropoda
- Class: Insecta
- Order: Lepidoptera
- Family: Drepanidae
- Subfamily: Drepaninae
- Genus: Eudeilinia; Packard, 1876

Moth genus in family Drepanidae

Eudeilinia is a genus of moths belonging to the subfamily Drepaninae.

== Species ==
- Eudeilinia herminiata Guenée, 1857
- Eudeilinia luteifera Dyar, 1917
