= Callicilix =

Scientific classification
- Domain: Eukaryota
- Kingdom: Animalia
- Phylum: Arthropoda
- Class: Insecta
- Order: Lepidoptera
- Family: Drepanidae
- Subfamily: Drepaninae
- Genus: Callicilix; Butler, 1885
- Species: C. abraxata

Binomial name
- Callicilix abraxata (Butler, 1885)

Synonyms
- Platypteryx nguldoe Oberthür, 1893; Callicilix abraxata formosana Okano, 1960

Monotypic genus of moths

Callicilix is a monotypic genus of moths belonging to the subfamily Drepaninae and contains the single species Callicilix abraxata.

The wingspan is about 44 mm. Adults are creamy-white, all wings with a marginal series of large oval grey-brown spots and some partly confluent irregular patches tending to form a submarginal band. The forewings are crossed by a broad and somewhat irregular central belt, which is grey-brown towards the costa and enclosing a spot of the ground colour, but dark golden brown below the subcostal vein, crossed by pearl-grey veins with black extremities and transversed internally by a pale sinuous line. There are three grey-brown spots across the basal area and there are two oval spots on the radial interspaces and a third pearl-white spot near the apex. The hindwings have a large grey-brown patch from the center of the abdominal margin to the middle of the wing, where it is continued by two spots to the costa. There is a small spot near the base of the interno-median area and four pearl-white spots on the disc between the submedian and radial veins.

== Subspecies ==
- Callicilix abraxata abraxata (Japan)
- Callicilix abraxata nguldoe (Oberthür, 1893) China (Sichuan, Tibet, Guizhou, Hunan)
