= Gonoretodes =

Scientific classification
- Domain: Eukaryota
- Kingdom: Animalia
- Phylum: Arthropoda
- Class: Insecta
- Order: Lepidoptera
- Family: Drepanidae
- Subfamily: Drepaninae
- Genus: Gonoretodes; Watson, 1965
- Species: G. timea

Binomial name
- Gonoretodes timea Watson, 1965

Monotypic moth genus in family Drepanidae

Gonoretodes is a monotypic moth genus belonging to the subfamily Drepaninae from Madagascar. It was first described by Watson in 1965.

== Species ==
There is only one species in this genus: Gonoretodes timea Watson, 1965 from Moramanga in eastern Madagascar.
