= Yucilix =

Scientific classification
- Domain: Eukaryota
- Kingdom: Animalia
- Phylum: Arthropoda
- Class: Insecta
- Order: Lepidoptera
- Family: Drepanidae
- Genus: Yucilix; Yang, 1978
- Species: Y. xia

Binomial name
- Yucilix xia Yang, 1978

Monotypic moth genus in family Drepanidae

Yucilix is a monotypic moth genus in the family Drepanidae described by Yang in 1978. Its only species, Yucilix xia, described by the same author in the same year, is found in China.
