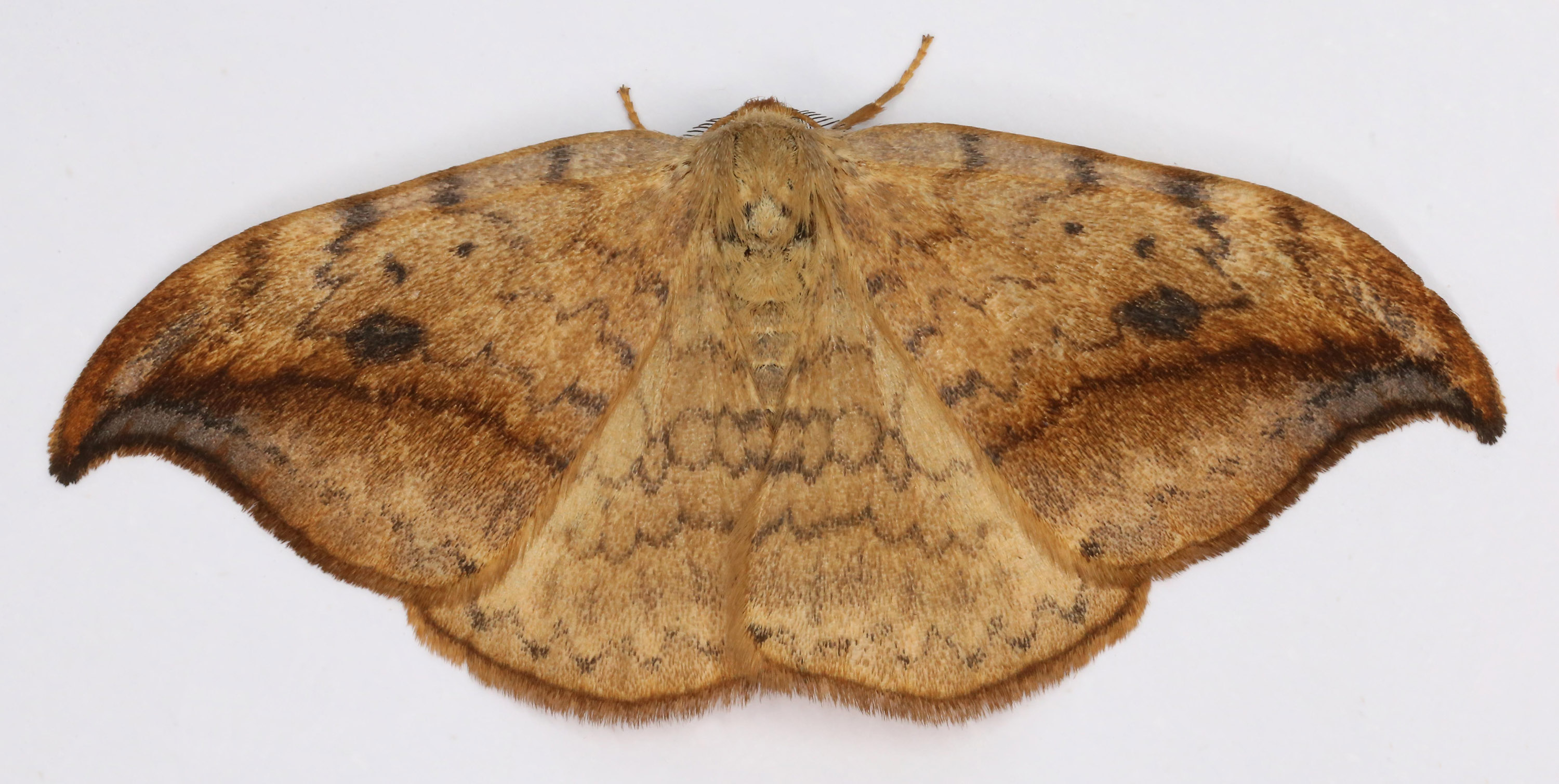
- Drepana falcataria, the pebble hook-tip

Scientific classification
- Kingdom: Animalia
- Phylum: Arthropoda
- Clade: Pancrustacea
- Class: Insecta
- Order: Lepidoptera
- Superfamily: Drepanoidea
- Family: Drepanidae; Meyrick, 1895

Subfamilies
- See text

= Drepanidae =

Family containing the hook-tip moths

The Drepanidae are a family of moths with about 660 species described worldwide. They are generally divided in three subfamilies, which share the same type of hearing organ. Thyatirinae, previously often placed in their own family, bear a superficial resemblance to Noctuidae. Many species in the drepanid family have a distinctively hook-shaped apex to the fore wing, leading to their common name of hook-tips.

The larvae of many species are very distinctive, tapering to a point at the tail and usually resting with both head and tail raised. They usually feed on the leaves of trees and shrubs, pupating between leaves spun together with silk.

== Taxonomy ==
- Subfamily Drepaninae – hook-tips
- Subfamily Thyatirinae – false owlets
- Subfamily Cyclidiinae
- Unassigned to subfamily
  - Hypsidia Rothschild, 1896
  - Yucilix Yang, 1978

== See also ==
- List of drepanid genera
