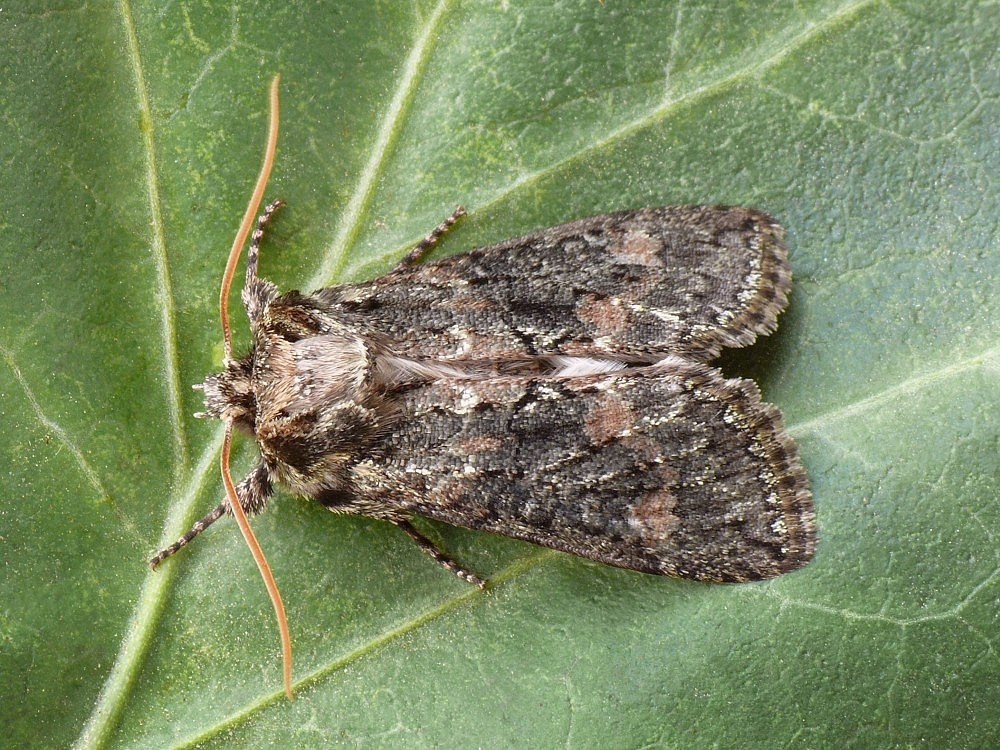
- Polyploca ridens

Scientific classification
- Kingdom: Animalia
- Phylum: Arthropoda
- Clade: Pancrustacea
- Class: Insecta
- Order: Lepidoptera
- Family: Drepanidae
- Subfamily: Thyatirinae
- Genus: Polyploca; Hübner, 1821

Synonyms
- Parmelina Houlbert, 1921; Asphalia Hübner, [1821]; Scodra Heinemann, 1859

= Polyploca =

Moth genus in family Drepanidae

Polyploca is a genus of moths belonging to the subfamily Thyatirinae of the Drepanidae.

== Species ==
- Polyploca korbi Rebel, 1901
- Polyploca laororshanae Laszlo, G.Ronkay, L.Ronkay & Witt, 2006
- Polyploca latens Laszlo, G.Ronkay, L.Ronkay & Witt, 2008
- Polyploca ridens Fabricius, 1787
- Polyploca ruficollis Schiffermüller & Denis, 1776

== Former species ==
- Polyploca anguligera Hampson, 1893
- Polyploca bifasciata Hampson, 1895
- Polyploca castaneata Warren, 1915
- Polyploca curvicosta Warren, 1915
- Polyploca galema Swinhoe, 1894
- Polyploca hoerburgeri Schawerda, 1924
- Polyploca honei Sick, 1941
- Polyploca neoridens Parenzan, 1976
- Polyploca nigrofascicula Graeser, 1888
- Polyploca nigripunctata Warren, 1915
- Polyploca nigropunctata Sick, 1941
- Polyploca semiobsoleta Warren, 1915
- Polyploca singularis Houlbert, 1921
