= Mimopsestis =

Scientific classification
- Kingdom: Animalia
- Phylum: Arthropoda
- Class: Insecta
- Order: Lepidoptera
- Family: Drepanidae
- Subfamily: Thyatirinae
- Genus: Mimopsestis; Matsumura, 1921
- Species: M. basalis

Binomial name
- Mimopsestis basalis (Wileman, 1911)

Synonyms
- Generic; Spilobasis Houlbert, 1921; Specific; Palimpsestes basalis Wileman, 1911

Monotypic moth genus in family Drepanidae

Mimopsestis is a monotypic moth genus belonging to the subfamily Thyatirinae of the Drepanidae. It was described by Shōnen Matsumura in 1921. Its single species, Mimopsestis basalis, was described by Wileman in 1911. It is found in Japan and the Chinese provinces of Henan, Shaanxi, Hubei and Hunan.

The wingspan is about 50 mm. The forewings are whitish grey, tinged with fuscous on the outer third. The basal area, limited by a black obtusely angled line, is brownish and darker on the costal portion. There are some long black scales on the median nervule and the stigmata are represented by tufts of white scales, with some black scales at the lower end of the reniform. The postmedial line is black, wavy and excurved to vein 2, thence straight to the inner margin. This line is most distinct on the costa, and is followed by a wavy pale-edged dusky line. The antemarginal line is whitish and wavy. The hindwings are whitish grey suffused with fuscous. The median line is blackish, double and indistinct.

== Subspecies ==
- Mimopsestis basalis basalis (Japan)
- Mimopsestis basalis sinensis Laszlo, G. Ronkay, L. Ronkay & Witt, 2007 (China: Henan, Shaanxi, Hubei, Hunan)

== Former species ==
- Mimopsestis albogrisea Mell, 1942
- Mimopsestis circumdata Houlbert, 1921
- Mimopsestis curvata Sick, 1941
- Mimopsestis determinata Bryk, 1943
- Mimopsestis flammifera Houlbert, 1921
- Mimopsestis hoenei Sick, 1941
- Mimopsestis minor Sick, 1941
- Mimopsestis pseudomaculata Houlbert, 1921
