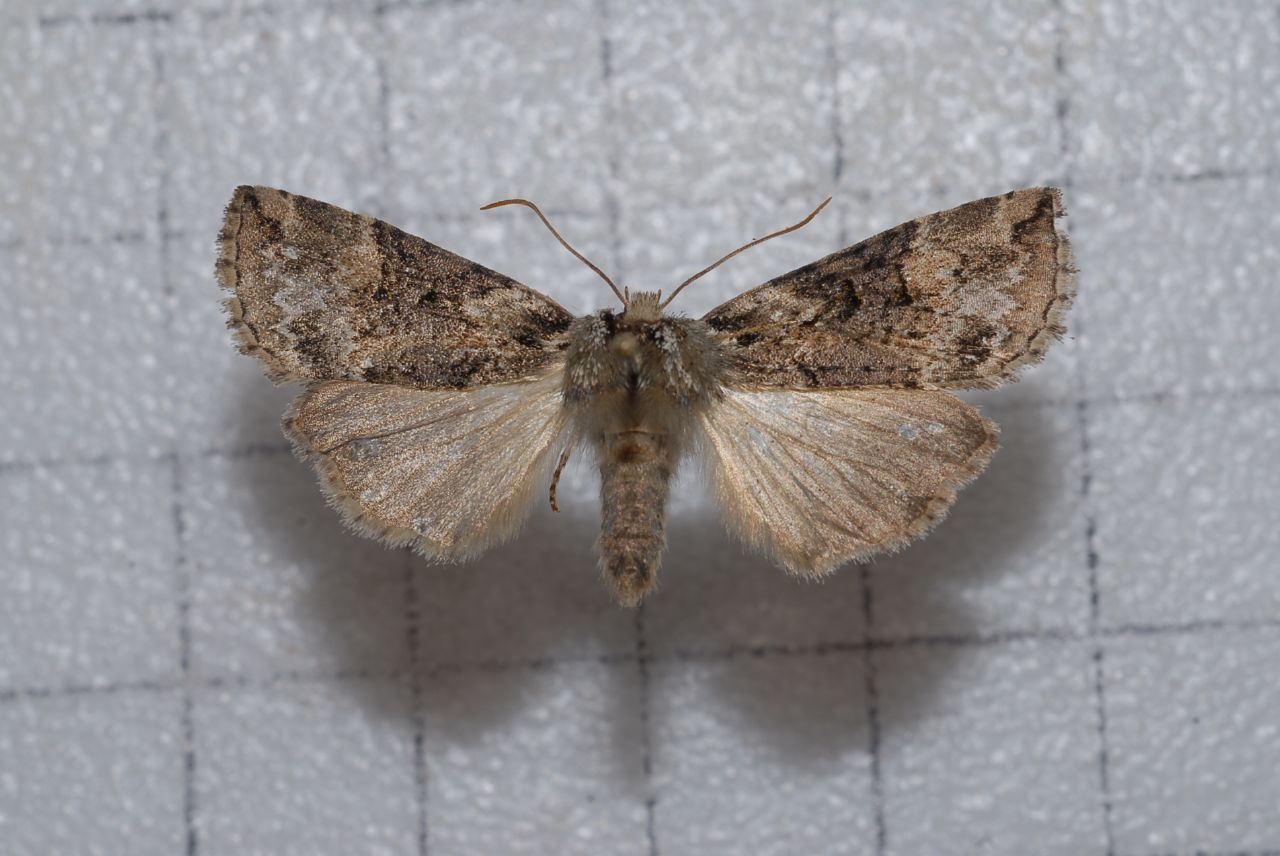
- Epipsestis meilingchani

Scientific classification
- Domain: Eukaryota
- Kingdom: Animalia
- Phylum: Arthropoda
- Class: Insecta
- Order: Lepidoptera
- Family: Drepanidae
- Subfamily: Thyatirinae
- Genus: Epipsestis; Matsumura, 1921

Synonyms
- Neopsestis Matsumura, 1933; Sugiploca Matsumura, 1933

= Epipsestis =

Moth genus in family Drepanidae

Epipsestis is a genus of moths belonging to the subfamily Thyatirinae of the Drepanidae. It was erected by Shōnen Matsumura in 1921.

== Species ==
- Species group ornata
  - Epipsestis manmiaoyangi László & Ronkay, 1999
  - Epipsestis ornata (Leech, [1889])
- Species group nikkoensis
  - Epipsestis nikkoensis (Matsumura, 1921)
- Species group castaneata
  - Epipsestis bilineata (Warren, 1915) (=Epipsestis acutangula (Warren, 1915))
  - Epipsestis castaneata (Warren, 1915)
  - Epipsestis peregovitsi Laszlo & G. Ronkay, 2000
- Species group dubia
  - Epipsestis albicosta Yoshimoto, 1993
  - Epipsestis albidisca (Warren, 1888)
  - Epipsestis dubia (Warren, 1888)
  - Epipsestis longipennis Yoshimoto, 1982
  - Epipsestis medialis Yoshimoto, 1982
  - Epipsestis mediofusca Yoshimoto, 1982
  - Epipsestis meilingchani László & Ronkay, 1999
  - Epipsestis niveifasciata Laszlo & G. Ronkay, 2000
  - Epipsestis witti Laszlo, G. Ronkay & L. Ronkay, 2007
- Species group vastaguncus
  - Epipsestis vastaguncus Laszlo & G. Ronkay, 2000
- Species group nigropunctata
  - Epipsestis bisociata Laszlo & G. Ronkay, 2000
  - Epipsestis nigropunctata (Sick, 1941)
  - Epipsestis stueningi Yoshimoto, 1988
- Species group cortigera
  - Epipsestis cortigera Yoshimoto, 1995
  - Epipsestis wernyi Laszlo, G. Ronkay, L. Ronkay & Witt, 2007
- Species group renalis
  - Epipsestis renalis (Moore, 1888)

== Former species ==
- Epipsestis griseata (Warren, 1915)
- Epipsestis orbicularis (Moore, 1888)
