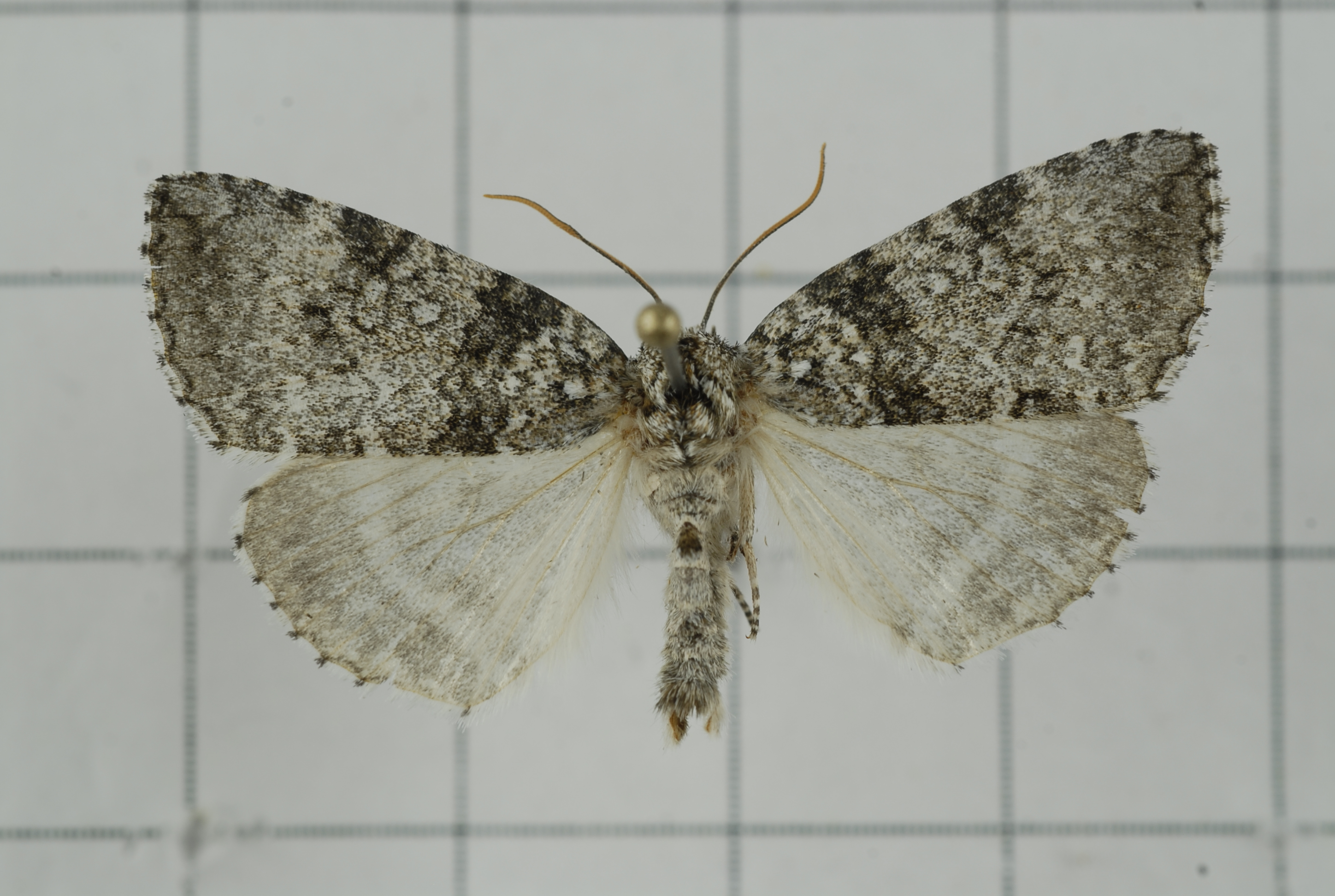
- Parapsestis argenteopicta

Scientific classification
- Kingdom: Animalia
- Phylum: Arthropoda
- Class: Insecta
- Order: Lepidoptera
- Family: Drepanidae
- Subfamily: Thyatirinae
- Genus: Parapsestis; Warren, 1912

Synonyms
- Baipsestis Matsumura, 1933; Suzupsestis Matsumura, 1933

= Parapsestis =

Moth genus in family Drepanidae

Parapsestis is a genus of moths belonging to the subfamily Thyatirinae of the Drepanidae.

== Species ==
- Parapsestis albida Suzuki, 1916
- Parapsestis argenteopicta (Oberthür, 1879)
- Parapsestis cinerea Laszlo, G. Ronkay, L. Ronkay & Witt, 2007
- Parapsestis dabashana Laszlo, G. Ronkay, L. Ronkay & Witt, 2007
- Parapsestis hausmanni Laszlo, G. Ronkay, L. Ronkay & Witt, 2007
- Parapsestis implicata Laszlo, G. Ronkay, L. Ronkay & Witt, 2007
- Parapsestis lichenea (Hampson, 1893)
- Parapsestis meleagris Houlbert, 1921
- Parapsestis odilei Orhant, 2006
- Parapsestis pseudomaculata (Houlbert, 1921)
- Parapsestis tomponis (Matsumura, 1933)
- Parapsestis wernyaminta Laszlo, G. Ronkay, L. Ronkay & Witt, 2007

== Former species ==
- Parapsestis baibarana
- Parapsestis taiwana
- Parapsestis umbrosa
