= Parapsestis albida =

Scientific classification
- Domain: Eukaryota
- Kingdom: Animalia
- Phylum: Arthropoda
- Class: Insecta
- Order: Lepidoptera
- Family: Drepanidae
- Genus: Parapsestis
- Species: P. albida

Binomial name
- Parapsestis albida Suzuki, 1916

Synonyms
- Nemacerota bilineata Matsumura, 1921; Palimpsestis dysanacrita R.J. West, 1932

Species of false owlet moth

Parapsestis albida is a moth in the family Drepanidae. It was described by Suzuki in 1916. It is found in Japan and China (Shaanxi, Gansu). The Global Lepidoptera Names Index gives this name as a synonym of Parapsestis umbrosa.
