= Toelgyfaloca =

Scientific classification
- Kingdom: Animalia
- Phylum: Arthropoda
- Clade: Pancrustacea
- Class: Insecta
- Order: Lepidoptera
- Family: Drepanidae
- Subfamily: Thyatirinae
- Genus: Toelgyfaloca; Laszlo, G.Ronkay, L.Ronkay & Witt, 2007

Moth genus in family Drepanidae

Toelgyfaloca is a genus of moths belonging to the subfamily Thyatirinae of the Drepanidae.

== Species ==
- Toelgyfaloca albogrisea (Mell, 1942)
- Toelgyfaloca circumdata Houlbert, 1921
