= Epipsestis renalis =

Scientific classification
- Domain: Eukaryota
- Kingdom: Animalia
- Phylum: Arthropoda
- Class: Insecta
- Order: Lepidoptera
- Family: Drepanidae
- Genus: Epipsestis
- Species: E. renalis

Binomial name
- Epipsestis renalis (Moore, 1888)

Synonyms
- Palimpsestis renalis Moore, 1888; Polyploca renalis; Cymatophora renalis

Species of false owlet moth

Epipsestis renalis is a moth in the family Drepanidae. It is found in western India (Kangra, Dharmsala), Nepal, Hunan in China, Pakistan, Vietnam and Thailand.

The length of the forewings is about 15 mm. Adults are purplish brownish grey, the forewings with a slender, black, erect, sinuous antemedial line, and an outwardly-angulated postmedial line. Contiguous to the latter are two or three less distinct lines, followed by a more distinct submarginal denticulated line and a marginal row of short linear spots. Between the medial bands, the area is grey and the orbicular and reniform spots are pinkish, and both are bordered posteriorly by a raised tuft of brown scales. The hindwings are dusky brown.
