= Takapsestis =

Scientific classification
- Kingdom: Animalia
- Phylum: Arthropoda
- Clade: Pancrustacea
- Class: Insecta
- Order: Lepidoptera
- Family: Drepanidae
- Genus: Takapsestis; Matsumura, 1933

Synonyms
- Neogaurena Roepke, 1944

Moth genus in family Drepanidae

Takapsestis is a genus of moths belonging to the subfamily Thyatirinae of the Drepanidae. It was erected by Shōnen Matsumura in 1933.

== Species ==
- subgenus Neogaurena Roepke, 1944
  - Takapsestis semiobsoleta (Warren, 1915)
- subgenus Neotakatogaria László, G. Ronkay & L. Ronkay, 2001
  - Takapsestis curvicosta (Warren, 1915)
- subgenus Takapsestis
  - Takapsestis bifasciata (Hampson, 1895)
  - Takapsestis fascinata Yoshimoto, 1990
  - Takapsestis orbicularis (Moore, 1888)
  - Takapsestis wilemaniella Matsumura, 1933
