= Epipsestis manmiaoyangi =

Scientific classification
- Domain: Eukaryota
- Kingdom: Animalia
- Phylum: Arthropoda
- Class: Insecta
- Order: Lepidoptera
- Family: Drepanidae
- Genus: Epipsestis
- Species: E. manmiaoyangi

Binomial name
- Epipsestis manmiaoyangi László & G. Ronkay, 1999

Species of false owlet moth

Epipsestis manmiaoyangi is a moth of the family Drepanidae first described by Gyula M. László and Gábor Ronkay in 1999. It is found in Taiwan.

The wingspan is 33–37 mm. Adults are on wing in late autumn.
