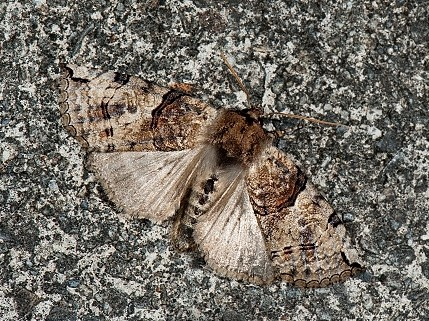
- Neotogaria saitonis

Scientific classification
- Kingdom: Animalia
- Phylum: Arthropoda
- Clade: Pancrustacea
- Class: Insecta
- Order: Lepidoptera
- Family: Drepanidae
- Subfamily: Thyatirinae
- Genus: Neotogaria; Matsumura, 1933

= Neotogaria =

Moth genus in family Drepanidae

Neotogaria is a genus of moths belonging to the subfamily Thyatirinae of the Drepanidae.

== Species ==
- Neotogaria anguligera (Hampson, 1893)
- Neotogaria baenzigeri Laszlo, G. Ronkay, L. Ronkay & Witt, 2007
- Neotogaria flammifera (Houlbert, 1921)
- Neotogaria galema (Swinhoe, 1894)
- Neotogaria hoenei (Sick, 1941)
- Neotogaria saitonis Matsumura, 1931
- Neotogaria thomaswitti Laszlo, G. Ronkay & L. Ronkay, 2007
