= Polyploca korbi =

Scientific classification
- Domain: Eukaryota
- Kingdom: Animalia
- Phylum: Arthropoda
- Class: Insecta
- Order: Lepidoptera
- Family: Drepanidae
- Genus: Polyploca
- Species: P. korbi

Binomial name
- Polyploca korbi Rebel, 1901

Species of false owlet moth

Polyploca korbi is a moth in the family Drepanidae. It is found in Turkey and on the Greek island of Samos.

The wingspan is 29.5–33 mm.

The larvae feed on Quercus pubescens and Quercus infectoria. They can be found in April and May.

== Etymology ==
The species is named for Max Korb, who first discovered the species.
