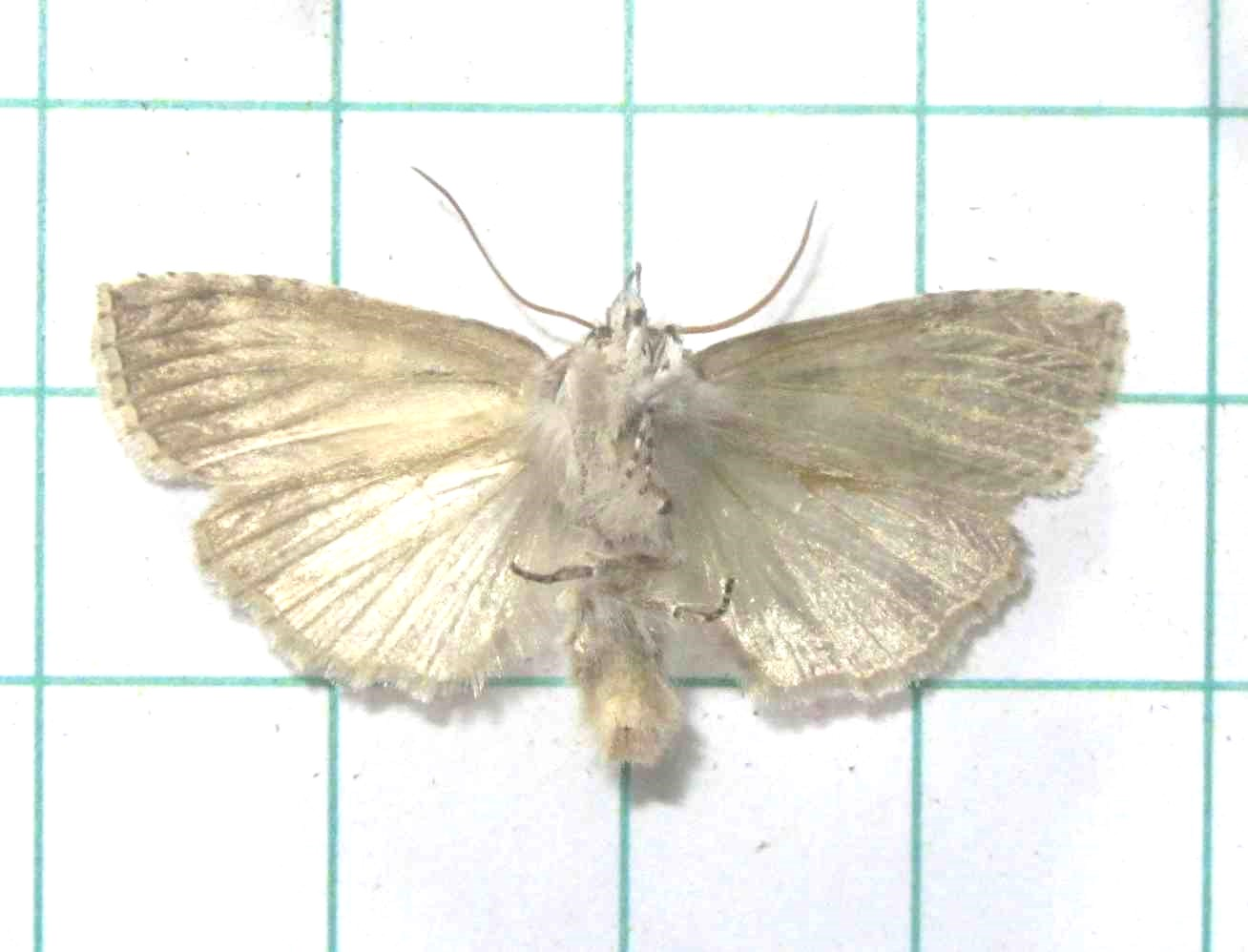
- Takapsestis wilemaniella

Scientific classification
- Kingdom: Animalia
- Phylum: Arthropoda
- Clade: Pancrustacea
- Class: Insecta
- Order: Lepidoptera
- Family: Drepanidae
- Genus: Takapsestis
- Species: T. wilemaniella

Binomial name
- Takapsestis wilemaniella Matsumura, 1933

Synonyms
- Polyploca albibasis Wileman, 1914 (preocc. Hampson, 1893)

= Takapsestis wilemaniella =

Species of false owlet moth

Takapsestis wilemaniella is a moth in the family Drepanidae. It was described by Shōnen Matsumura in 1933. It is found in Nepal, Taiwan, Vietnam and Fujian, China.

== Subspecies ==
- Takapsestis wilemaniella wilemaniella (Taiwan)
- Takapsestis wilemaniella continentalis Laszlo, Ronkay & Ronkay, 2001 (Vietnam, China: Fujian)
- Takapsestis wilemaniella plumbeata László, Ronkay & Ronkay, 2001 (Nepal)
