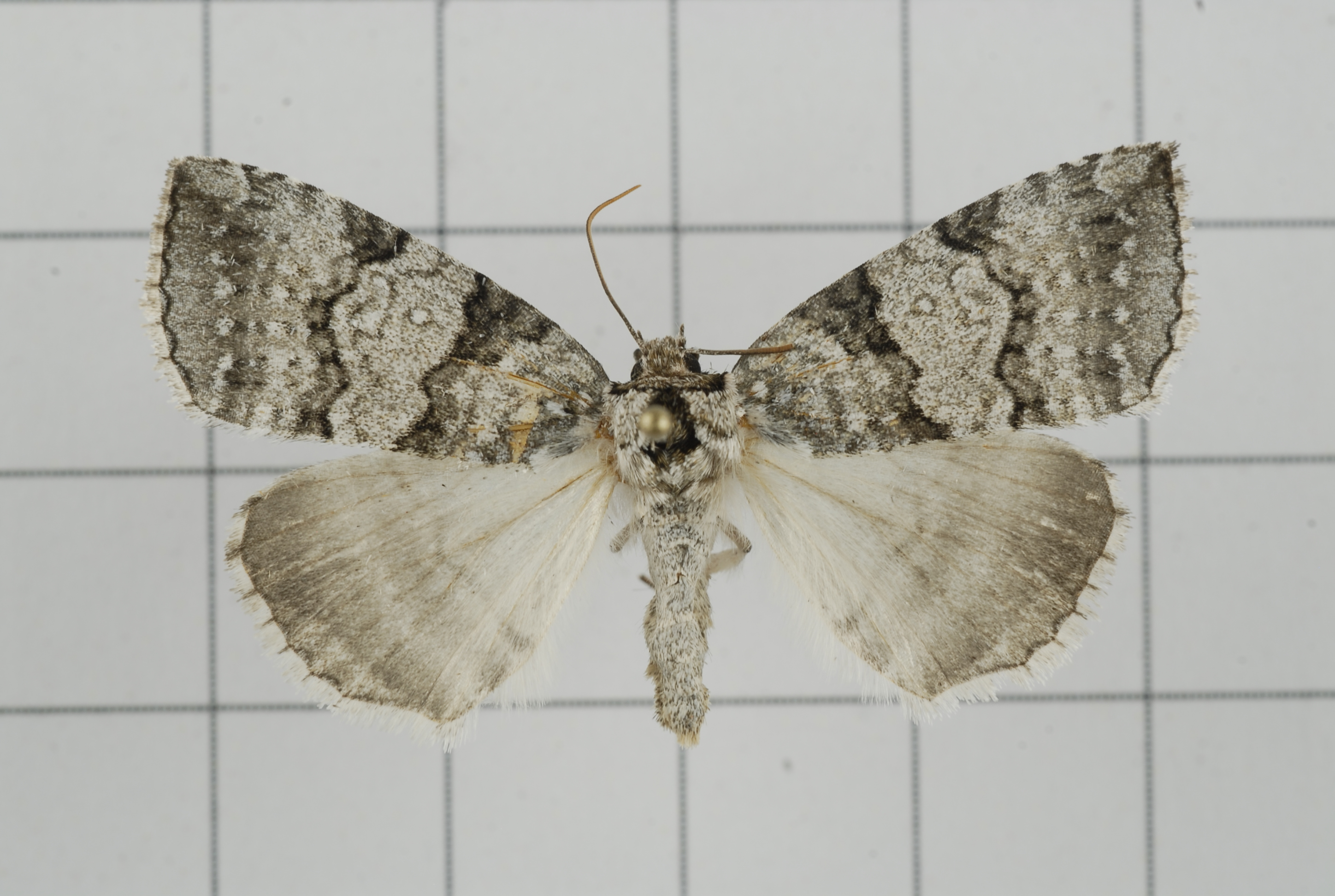

Scientific classification
- Kingdom: Animalia
- Phylum: Arthropoda
- Clade: Pancrustacea
- Class: Insecta
- Order: Lepidoptera
- Family: Drepanidae
- Genus: Parapsestis
- Species: P. tomponis

Binomial name
- Parapsestis tomponis (Matsumura, 1933)

Synonyms
- Baipsestis tomponis Matsumura, 1933; Palimpsestes taiwana ab. obsoleta Wileman, 1911

= Parapsestis tomponis =

Species of false owlet moth

Parapsestis tomponis is a moth in the family Drepanidae. It was described by Shōnen Matsumura in 1933. It is found in Taiwan, Vietnam and the Chinese provinces of Henan, Shaanxi, Gansu, Hubei, Hunan, Fujian, Sichuan, Guizhou and Yunnan.

== Subspecies ==
- Parapsestis tomponis tomponis (Taiwan)
- Parapsestis tomponis almasderes Laszlo, G. Ronkay, L. Ronkay & Witt, 2007 (Vietnam, China: Henan, Shaanxi, Gansu, Hubei, Hunan, Fujian, Sichuan, Guizhou, Yunnan)
