= Epipsestis niveifasciata =

Scientific classification
- Domain: Eukaryota
- Kingdom: Animalia
- Phylum: Arthropoda
- Class: Insecta
- Order: Lepidoptera
- Family: Drepanidae
- Genus: Epipsestis
- Species: E. niveifasciata

Binomial name
- Epipsestis niveifasciata Laszlo & G.Ronkay, 2000

Species of false owlet moth

Epipsestis niveifasciata is a moth in the family Drepanidae. It is found in Vietnam.
