= Betapsestis brevis =

Scientific classification
- Kingdom: Animalia
- Phylum: Arthropoda
- Class: Insecta
- Order: Lepidoptera
- Family: Drepanidae
- Genus: Betapsestis
- Species: B. brevis

Binomial name
- Betapsestis brevis (Leech, 1900)

Synonyms
- Palimpsestes brevis Leech, 1900

Species of false owlet moth

Betapsestis brevis is a moth in the family Drepanidae. It was described by John Henry Leech in 1900. It is found in the Chinese provinces of Shaanxi, Gansu and Sichuan.
