= Epipsestis stueningi =

Scientific classification
- Domain: Eukaryota
- Kingdom: Animalia
- Phylum: Arthropoda
- Class: Insecta
- Order: Lepidoptera
- Family: Drepanidae
- Genus: Epipsestis
- Species: E. stueningi

Binomial name
- Epipsestis stueningi Yoshimoto, 1988

Species of false owlet moth

Epipsestis stueningi is a moth in the family Drepanidae. It is found in Yunnan, China.

The wingspan is 30–35 mm.
