= Epipsestis longipennis =

Scientific classification
- Domain: Eukaryota
- Kingdom: Animalia
- Phylum: Arthropoda
- Class: Insecta
- Order: Lepidoptera
- Family: Drepanidae
- Genus: Epipsestis
- Species: E. longipennis

Binomial name
- Epipsestis longipennis Yoshimoto, 1982

Species of false owlet moth

Epipsestis longipennis is a moth in the family Drepanidae. It is found in Nepal.

The wingspan is 29–40 mm.
