= Parapsestis wernyaminta =

Scientific classification
- Kingdom: Animalia
- Phylum: Arthropoda
- Clade: Pancrustacea
- Class: Insecta
- Order: Lepidoptera
- Family: Drepanidae
- Genus: Parapsestis
- Species: P. wernyaminta

Binomial name
- Parapsestis wernyaminta László, G. Ronkay, L. Ronkay & Witt, 2007

Species of false owlet moth

Parapsestis wernyaminta is a moth in the family Drepanidae. It was described by Gyula M. László, Gábor Ronkay, László Aladár Ronkay and Thomas Joseph Witt in 2007. It is found in the Chinese provinces of Shaanxi, Henan and Sichuan.
