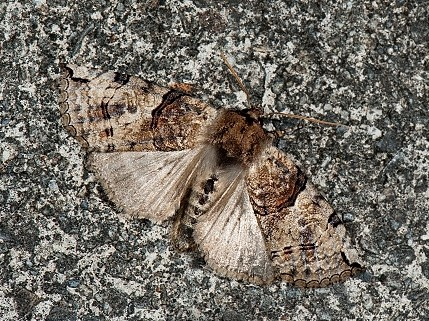

Scientific classification
- Kingdom: Animalia
- Phylum: Arthropoda
- Clade: Pancrustacea
- Class: Insecta
- Order: Lepidoptera
- Family: Drepanidae
- Genus: Neotogaria
- Species: N. saitonis

Binomial name
- Neotogaria saitonis Matsumura, 1931

= Neotogaria saitonis =

Species of false owlet moth

Neotogaria saitonis is a species of moth in the family Drepanidae. It was described by Shōnen Matsumura in 1931. It is found in Vietnam, China (Shaanxi, Zhejiang, Guangdong, Yunnan) and Taiwan.

== Subspecies ==
- Neotogaria saitonis saitonis (Taiwan)
- Neotogaria saitonis sinjaevi Laszlo, G. Ronkay, L. Ronkay & Witt, 2007 (Vietnam, China: Shaanxi, Zhejiang, Guangdong, Yunnan)
