= Parapsestis hausmanni =

Scientific classification
- Kingdom: Animalia
- Phylum: Arthropoda
- Clade: Pancrustacea
- Class: Insecta
- Order: Lepidoptera
- Family: Drepanidae
- Genus: Parapsestis
- Species: P. hausmanni

Binomial name
- Parapsestis hausmanni László, G. Ronkay, L. Ronkay & Witt, 2007

Species of false owlet moth

Parapsestis hausmanni is a moth in the family Drepanidae. It was described by Gyula M. László, Gábor Ronkay, László Aladár Ronkay and Thomas Joseph Witt in 2007. It is found in Vietnam and Guangxi, China.
