= Polyploca laororshanae =

Scientific classification
- Kingdom: Animalia
- Phylum: Arthropoda
- Clade: Pancrustacea
- Class: Insecta
- Order: Lepidoptera
- Family: Drepanidae
- Genus: Polyploca
- Species: P. laororshanae

Binomial name
- Polyploca laororshanae Laszlo, Ronkay, Ronkay & Witt, 2006

Species of false owlet moth

Polyploca laororshanae is a moth in the family Drepanidae. The habitat of P. laororshanae is located in northern Israel and possibly Lebanon and Syria, although this remains unclear. The habitat consists of clearings and the fringes of evergreen sclerophyllous maquis on limestone.

The wingspan of the species is 35–38 millimetres (1.4–1.5 in).

The larvae may feed on Quercus species.
