= Takapsestis fascinata =

Scientific classification
- Domain: Eukaryota
- Kingdom: Animalia
- Phylum: Arthropoda
- Class: Insecta
- Order: Lepidoptera
- Family: Drepanidae
- Genus: Takapsestis
- Species: T. fascinata

Binomial name
- Takapsestis fascinata Yoshimoto, 1990

Species of false owlet moth

Takapsestis fascinata is a moth in the family Drepanidae. It was described by Yoshimoto in 1990. It is found in northern Vietnam and Yunnan, China.
