= Parapsestis cinerea =

Scientific classification
- Kingdom: Animalia
- Phylum: Arthropoda
- Clade: Pancrustacea
- Class: Insecta
- Order: Lepidoptera
- Family: Drepanidae
- Genus: Parapsestis
- Species: P. cinerea

Binomial name
- Parapsestis cinerea László, G. Ronkay, L. Ronkay & Witt, 2007

Species of false owlet moth

Parapsestis cinerea is a moth in the family Drepanidae. It was described by Gyula M. László, Gábor Ronkay, László Aladár Ronkay and Thomas Joseph Witt in 2007. It is found in China in Henan, Shaanxi, Gansu, Zhejiang, Hubei, Guangxi, Sichuan, Jilin, Liaoning and Beijing, the Russian Far East and Korea.

== Subspecies ==
- Parapsestis cinerea cinerea (China: Henan, Shaanxi, Gansu, Zhejiang, Hubei, Guangxi, Sichuan)
- Parapsestis cinerea pacifica Laszlo, G. Ronkay, L. Ronkay & Witt, 2007 (south-eastern Russia, Korean Peninsula, China: Jilin, Liaoning, Beijing)
