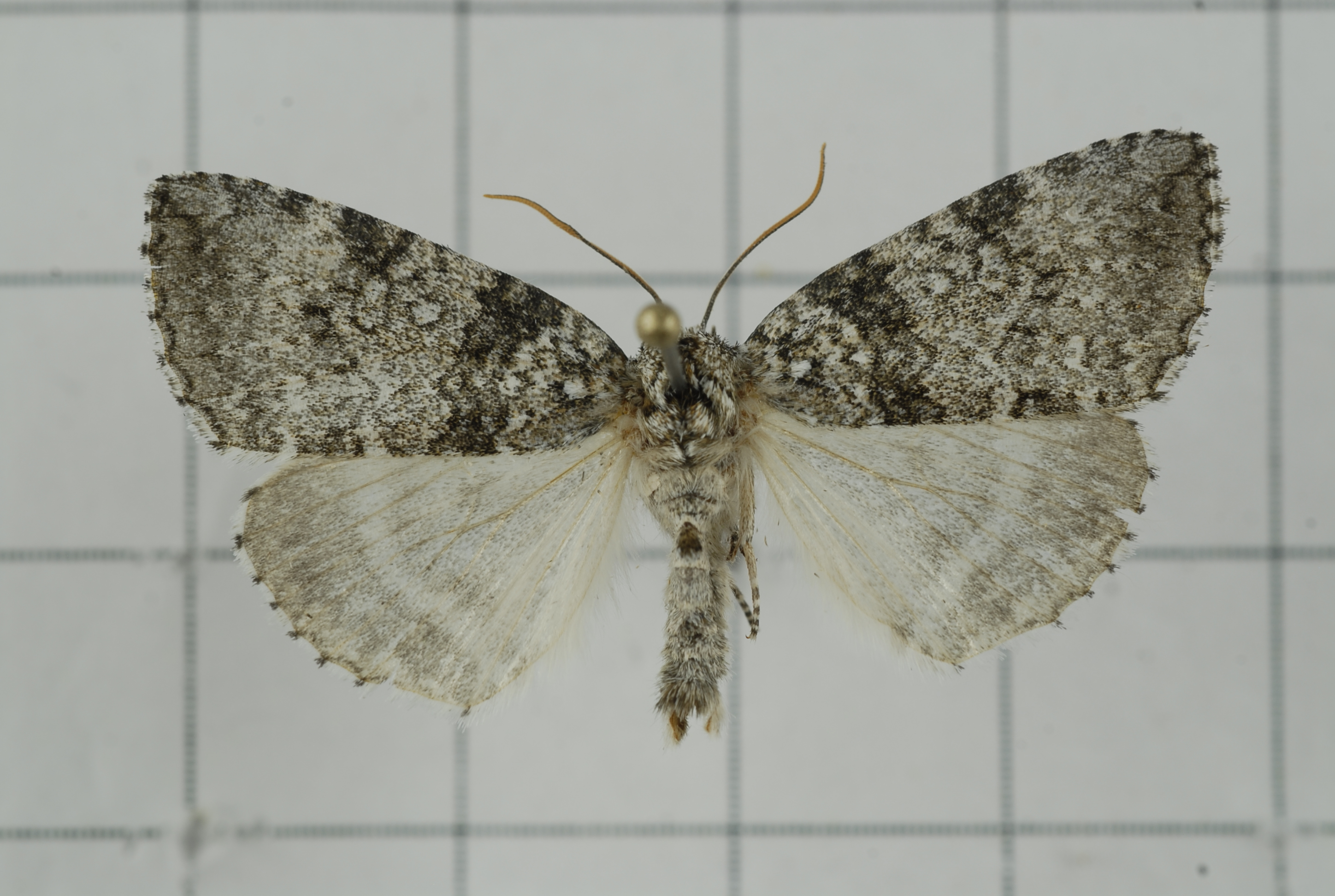

Scientific classification
- Kingdom: Animalia
- Phylum: Arthropoda
- Class: Insecta
- Order: Lepidoptera
- Family: Drepanidae
- Genus: Parapsestis
- Species: P. argenteopicta

Binomial name
- Parapsestis argenteopicta (Oberthür, 1879)

Synonyms
- Cymatophora argenteopicta Oberthür, 1879; Cymatophora plumbea Butler, 1879; Palimpsestis latipennis Matsumura, 1909; Palimpsestis suzukii Matsumura, 1921; Parapsestis albomarginalis Matsumura, 1927; Palimpsestes taiwana Wileman, 1911; Parapsestis baibarana Matsumura, 1931

= Parapsestis argenteopicta =

Species of false owlet moth

Parapsestis argenteopicta is a moth in the family Drepanidae. It was described by Oberthür in 1879. It is found in the Russian Far East, Korea, Japan, Taiwan, western, north-eastern, northern and central China and Nepal. The habitat consists of various types of mixed forests and oak woods.

The wingspan is 39–47 mm.

The larvae feed on Quercus mongolica.

== Subspecies ==
- Parapsestis argenteopicta argenteopicta (Russian Far East, Japan, Korea, China: Jilin, Henan, Shaanxi, Gansu, Zhejiang, Hubei, Jiangxi, Hunan, Sichuan, Yunnan)
- Parapsestis argenteopicta annamica Laszlo, G.Ronkay, L.Ronkay & Witt, 2007 (Nepal)
- Parapsestis argenteopicta nepalina Laszlo, G.Ronkay, L.Ronkay & Witt, 2007 (Nepal)
- Parapsestis argenteopicta taiwana (Wileman, 1911) (Taiwan)
