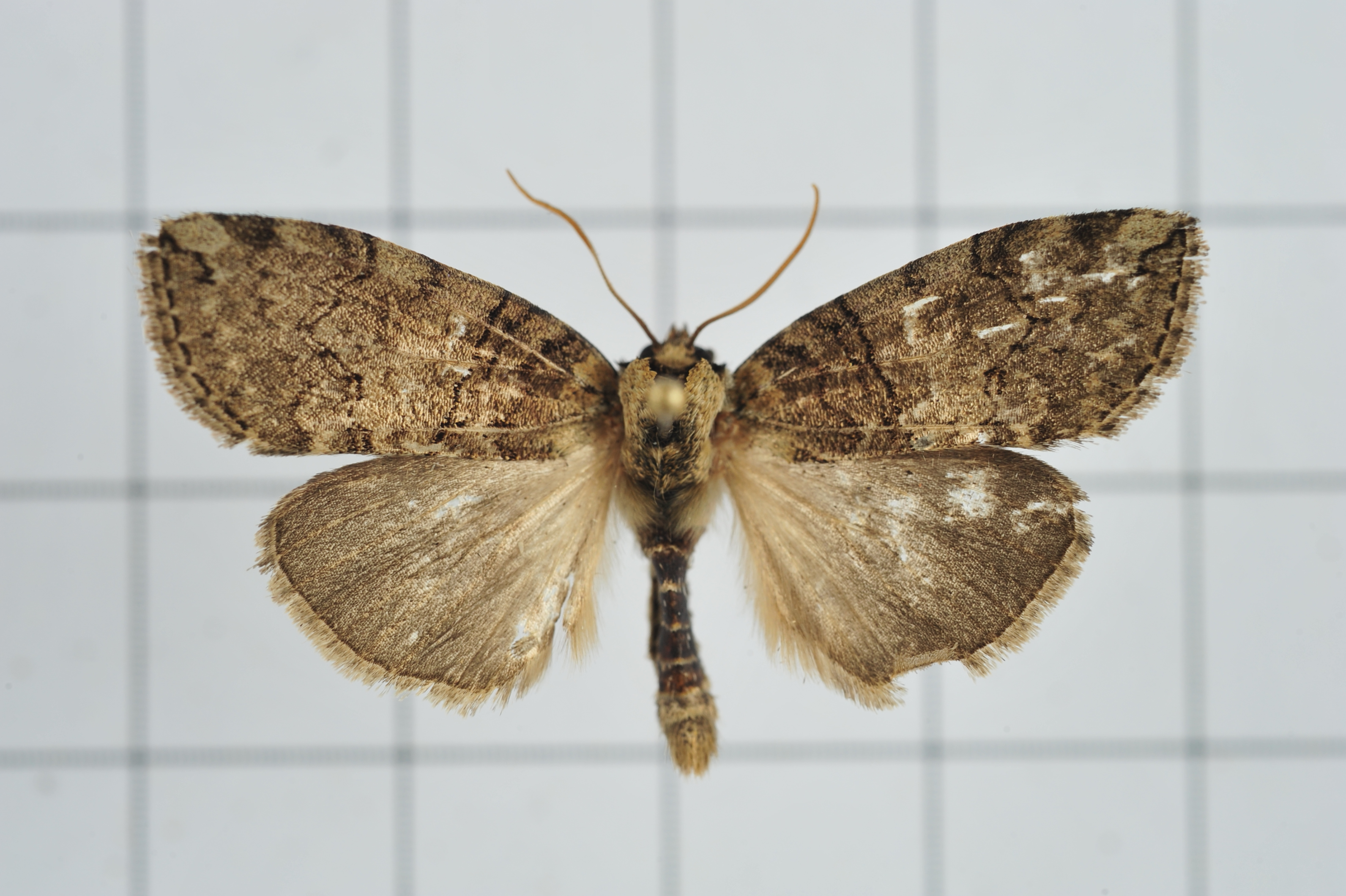

Scientific classification
- Kingdom: Animalia
- Phylum: Arthropoda
- Clade: Pancrustacea
- Class: Insecta
- Order: Lepidoptera
- Family: Drepanidae
- Subfamily: Thyatirinae
- Genus: Horipsestis
- Species: H. mushana

Binomial name
- Horipsestis mushana (Matsumura, 1931)

Synonyms
- Palimpsestis mushana Matsumura, 1931

= Horipsestis mushana =

Species of false owlet moth

Horipsestis mushana is a moth in the family Drepanidae. It is found in the Chinese provinces of Shaanxi, Hubei, Hunan, Fujian and Sichuan and in Japan, Taiwan and Vietnam.

== Subspecies ==
- Horipsestis mushana mushana (Taiwan)
- Horipsestis mushana schintlemeisteri Laszlo, G. Ronkay, L. Ronkay & Witt, 2007 (Vietnam)
