= Epipsestis bisociata =

Scientific classification
- Domain: Eukaryota
- Kingdom: Animalia
- Phylum: Arthropoda
- Class: Insecta
- Order: Lepidoptera
- Family: Drepanidae
- Genus: Epipsestis
- Species: E. bisociata

Binomial name
- Epipsestis bisociata Laszlo & G. Ronkay, 2000

Species of false owlet moth

Epipsestis bisociata is a moth in the family Drepanidae. It is found in Vietnam and Hunan, China.
