= Betapsestis =

Scientific classification
- Kingdom: Animalia
- Phylum: Arthropoda
- Clade: Pancrustacea
- Class: Insecta
- Order: Lepidoptera
- Family: Drepanidae
- Subfamily: Thyatirinae
- Genus: Betapsestis; Matsumura, 1921

Moth genus in family Drepanidae

Betapsestis is a genus of moths belonging to the subfamily Thyatirinae of the Drepanidae.

== Species ==
- Betapsestis brevis (Leech, 1900)
- Betapsestis umbrosa (Wileman, 1911)
