= Epipsestis ornata =

Scientific classification
- Domain: Eukaryota
- Kingdom: Animalia
- Phylum: Arthropoda
- Class: Insecta
- Order: Lepidoptera
- Family: Drepanidae
- Genus: Epipsestis
- Species: E. ornata

Binomial name
- Epipsestis ornata (Leech, [1889])

Synonyms
- Polyploca ornata Leech, 1889; Polyploca ornata var. unicolor Leech, 1889; Polyploca ornata var. concolor Dalla Torre, 1921; Sugiploca sugitanii Matsumura, 1933

Species of false owlet moth

Epipsestis ornata is a moth in the family Drepanidae. It was described by John Henry Leech in 1889. It is found in Japan, the Korean Peninsula, the Russian Far East and the Chinese provinces of Heilongjiang, Jilin and Shaanxi.

The wingspan is about 38 mm. The ground colour of the forewings is greyish brown, but browner along the base and costa. There is a series of dark wavy lines forming a broad band, the interior border of which is curved and sharply serrated, and the outer elbowed below the subcostal nervure, and indented above the inner margin. The central fascia is greyish white towards the inner margin, bordered externally by a blackish double line deeply angulated towards the outer margin, followed by a dark serrated line, and a fainter submarginal dentated line curving from the apex to the outer margin. There is a series of black linear marks along the outer margin, as well as three tufts of raised black scales, one forming a basal dash, the second representing the orbicular stigma and the third, which is edged with whitish, the reniform stigma. The hindwings are fuscous brown, darker towards the margins.

The larvae feed on Quercus mongolica.

== Subspecies ==
- Epipsestis ornata ornata (Japan)
- Epipsestis ornata obscurata Tshistjakov, 1987 (Russian Far East, Korean Peninsula, China: Heilongjiang, Jilin, Shaanxi)
