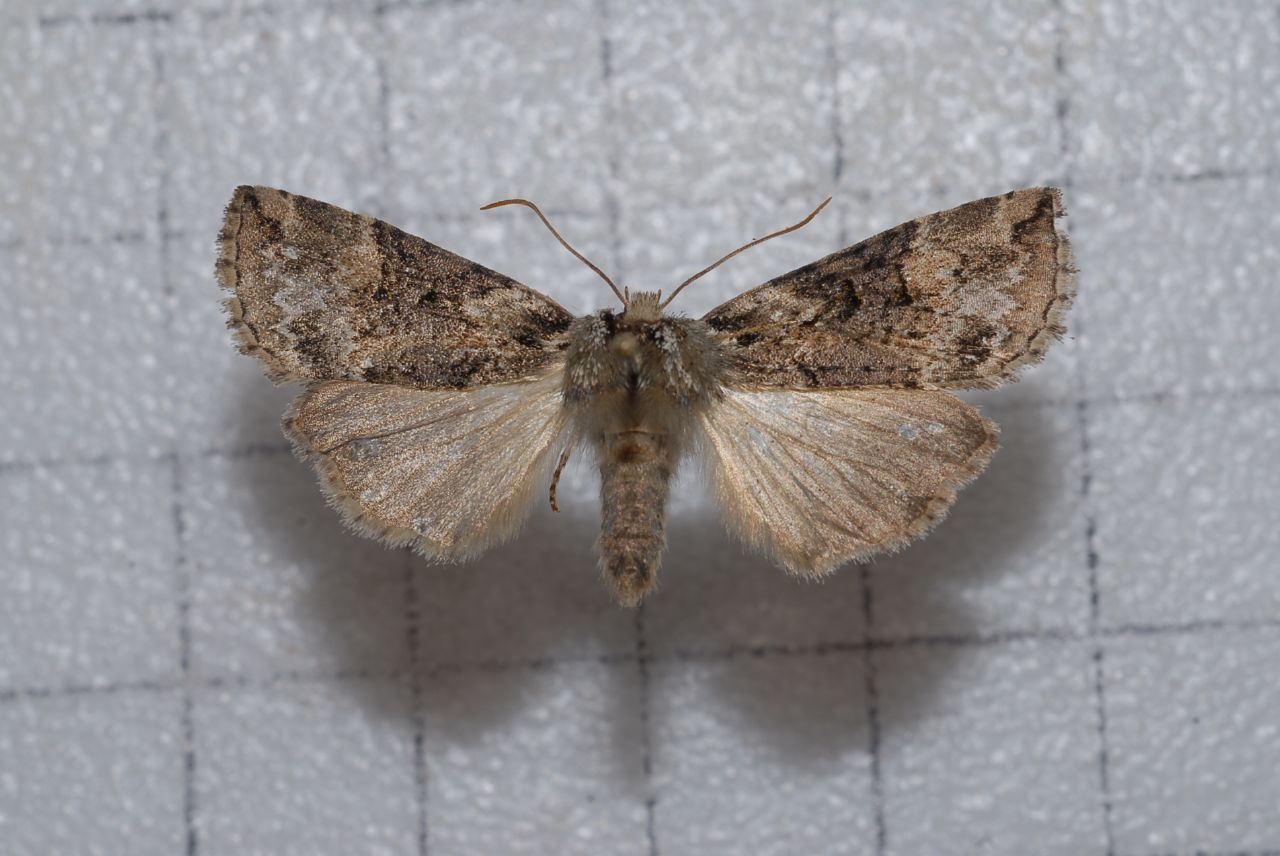

Scientific classification
- Domain: Eukaryota
- Kingdom: Animalia
- Phylum: Arthropoda
- Class: Insecta
- Order: Lepidoptera
- Family: Drepanidae
- Genus: Epipsestis
- Species: E. meilingchani

Binomial name
- Epipsestis meilingchani Laszlo & G. Ronkay, 2000

= Epipsestis meilingchani =

Species of false owlet moth

Epipsestis meilingchani is a moth of the family Drepanidae first described by Gyula M. László and Gábor Ronkay in 2000. It is found in Taiwan.

The wingspan is 32–37 mm. Adults are on wing from October to the end of February.
