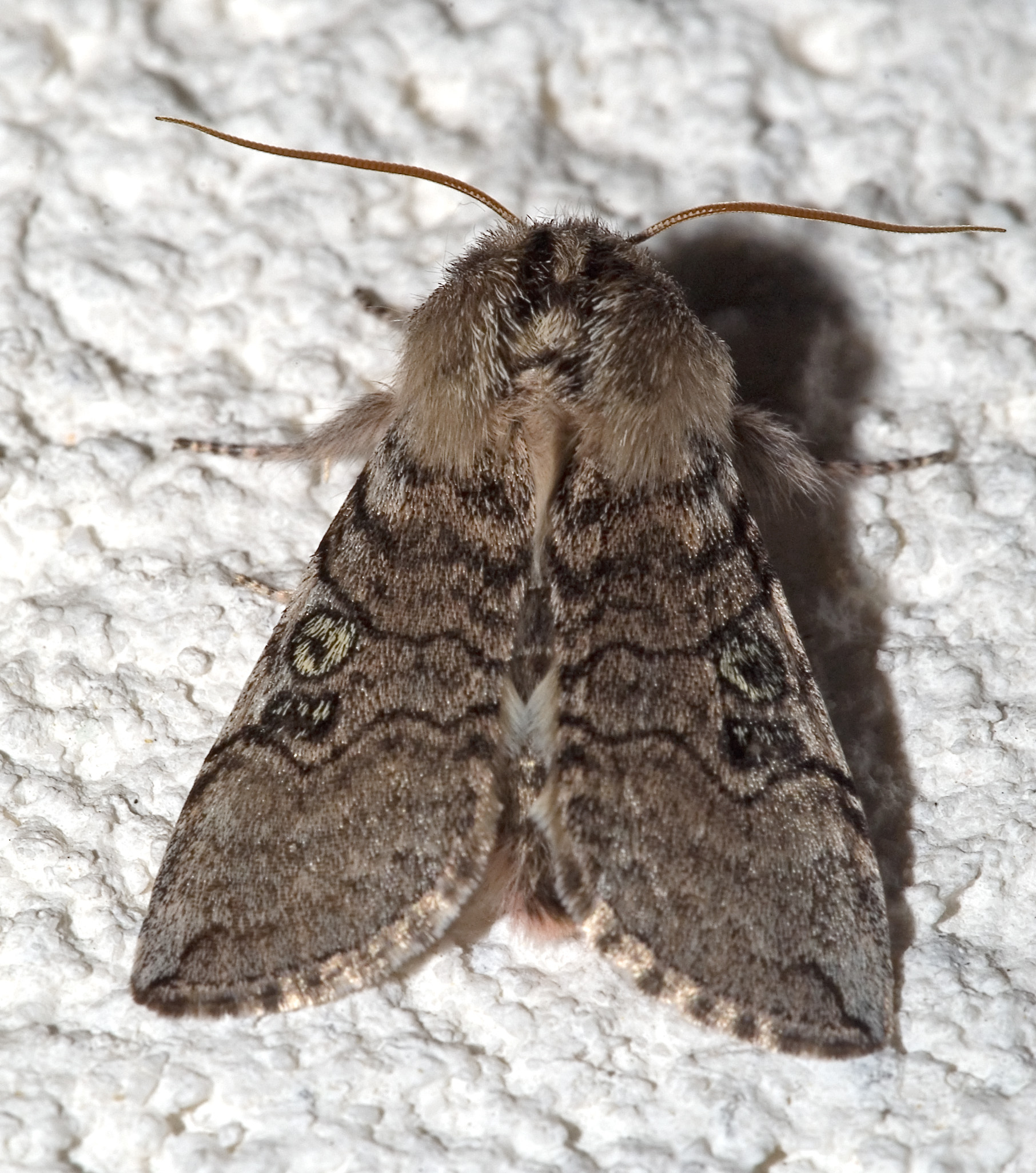

Scientific classification
- Kingdom: Animalia
- Phylum: Arthropoda
- Class: Insecta
- Order: Lepidoptera
- Family: Drepanidae
- Genus: Achyla
- Species: A. flavicornis

Binomial name
- Achlya flavicornis (Linnaeus, 1758)

Synonyms
- Phalaena flavicornis Linnaeus, 1758; Phalaena cinerea Hufnagel, 1766; Phalaena (Noctua) sulphureomaculata Retzius, 1783; Noctua luteicornis Haworth, 1810; Asphalia finmarchica Schöyen, 1881; Polyploca flavicornis lapponica Rangnow, 1935; Polyploca flavicornis meridionalis Wolfsberger, 1968; Asphalia galbanus Tutt, 1891

= Achlya flavicornis =

Species of false owlet moth

Achlya flavicornis, the yellow horned, is a moth of the family Drepanidae. The species was first described by Carl Linnaeus in his 1758 10th edition of Systema Naturae. It is found from Europe to the eastern Palearctic ecozone.

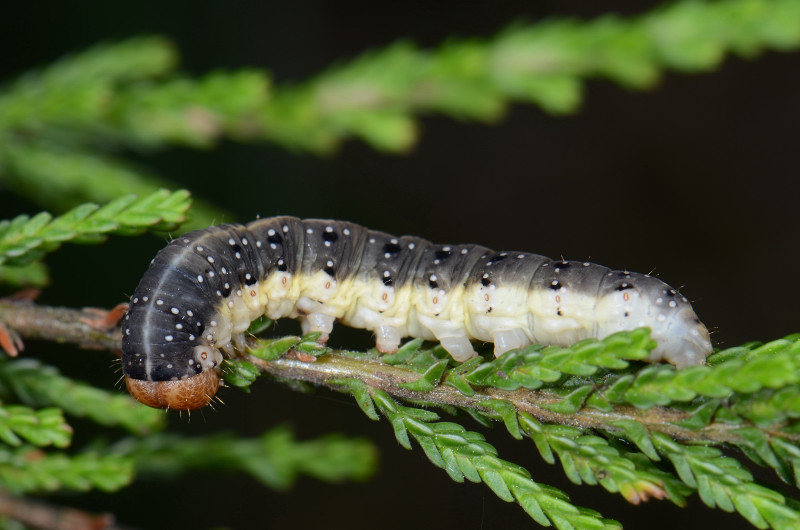
Larva

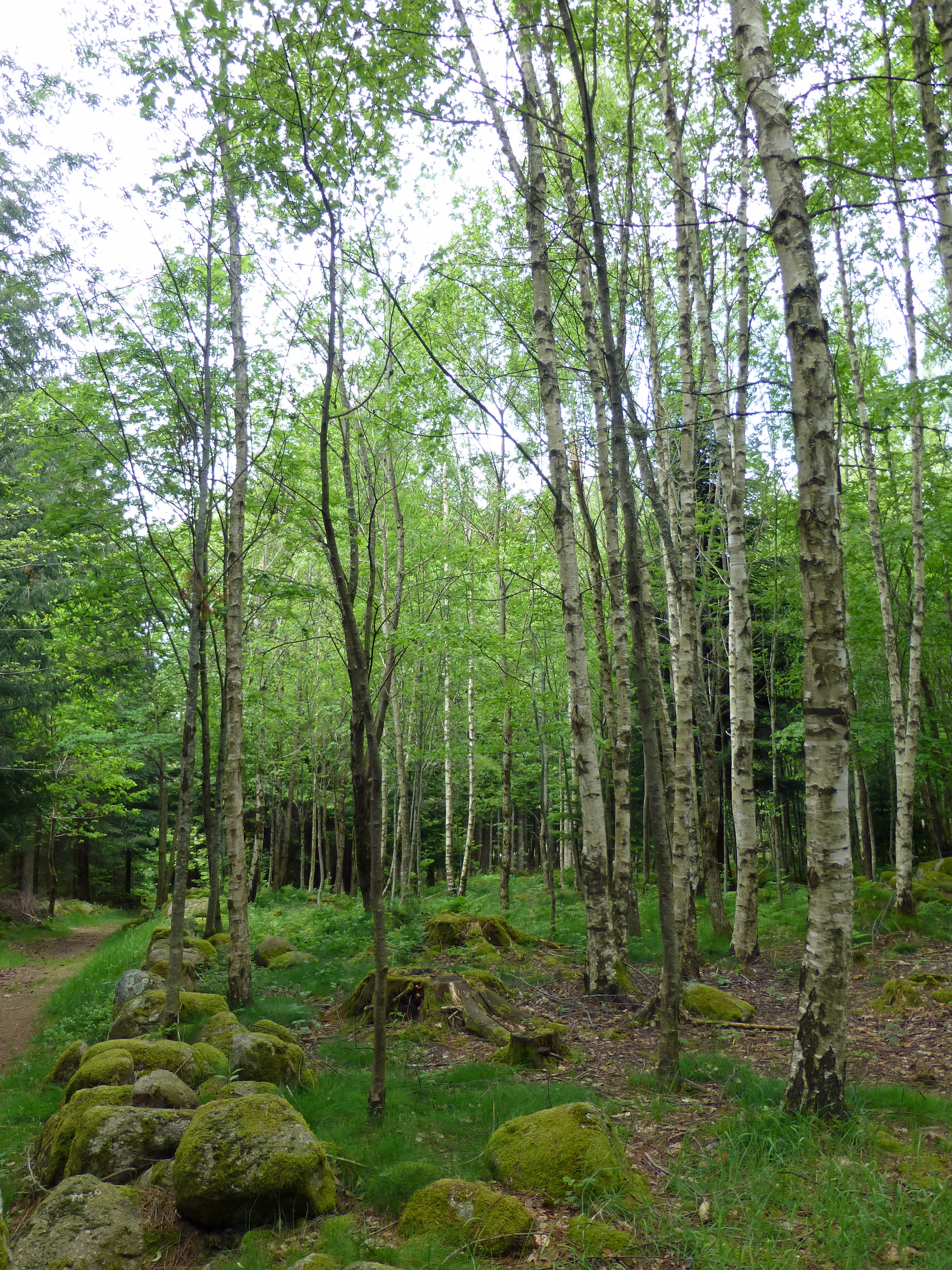
Birch woodland habitat

The wingspan is 35–40 mm. The length of the forewings is 17–20 mm. The ground colour is greenish grey, sometimes speckled or dusted with darker grey. The reniform and orbicular marks are generally clear and distinct, but in some examples they are united and form a whitish blotch outlined in blackish; the cross lines are usually well defined, but in the dark grey dusted form are very obscure. The moth flies from February to April depending on the location.

The final instar larva is either off white all over or off white below the spiracles and darker greyish or olive green dorsally. There is a row of black spots and finely black-edged white dots. The insect overwinters as a pupa in a cocoon, amongst leaf litter.

The larvae feed on birch.

== Subspecies ==
- Achlya flavicornis flavicornis
- Achlya flavicornis jesoensis (Matsumura, 1927) (Russian Far East, north-eastern China, Korea, Japan: Hokkaido)
- Achlya flavicornis sikhotensis Tshistjakov, 2008 (Russian Far East)
