= Horipsestis angusta =

Scientific classification
- Domain: Eukaryota
- Kingdom: Animalia
- Phylum: Arthropoda
- Class: Insecta
- Order: Lepidoptera
- Family: Drepanidae
- Subfamily: Thyatirinae
- Genus: Horipsestis
- Species: H. angusta

Binomial name
- Horipsestis angusta Yoshimoto, 1996

Synonyms
- Horipsestis aenea angusta Yoshimoto, 1996

Species of false owlet moth

Horipsestis angusta is a moth in the family Drepanidae. It is found in Thailand.
