= Epipsestis witti =

Scientific classification
- Domain: Eukaryota
- Kingdom: Animalia
- Phylum: Arthropoda
- Class: Insecta
- Order: Lepidoptera
- Family: Drepanidae
- Genus: Epipsestis
- Species: E. witti

Binomial name
- Epipsestis witti Laszlo, G. Ronkay & L. Ronkay, 2007

Species of false owlet moth

Epipsestis witti is a moth in the family Drepanidae. It is found in Nepal, Tibet in China, India, Vietnam and Thailand.
