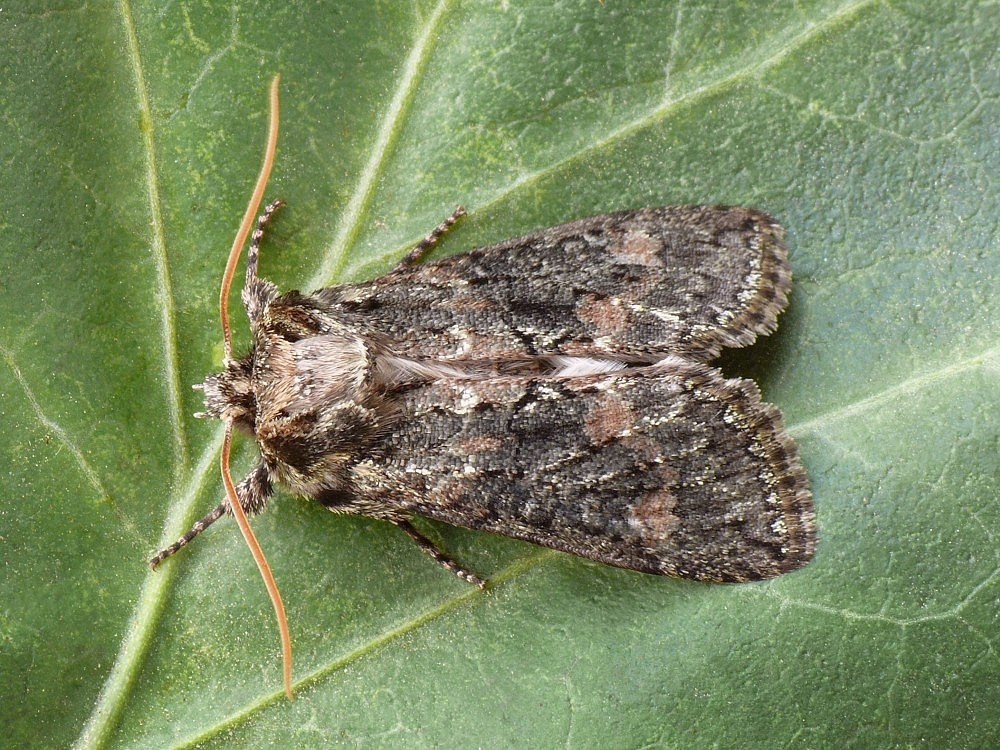

Scientific classification
- Kingdom: Animalia
- Phylum: Arthropoda
- Clade: Pancrustacea
- Class: Insecta
- Order: Lepidoptera
- Family: Drepanidae
- Genus: Polyploca
- Species: P. ridens

Binomial name
- Polyploca ridens (Fabricius, 1787)

Synonyms
- Noctua ridens Fabricius, 1787; Noctua flavicornis Denis & Schiffermüller, 1775; Phalaena (Noctua) xanthoceros Borkhausen, 1792; Noctua chrysoceras Beckwith, 1794; Parmelina singularis Houlbert, 1921; Parmelina ridens transmarina Rungs, 1972; Polyploca neoridens Parenzan, 1976

= Polyploca ridens =

Species of false owlet moth

Polyploca ridens, the frosted green, is a moth of the family Drepanidae. It is found in southern and central Europe, England, Denmark, southern Sweden and in the east up to Russia.

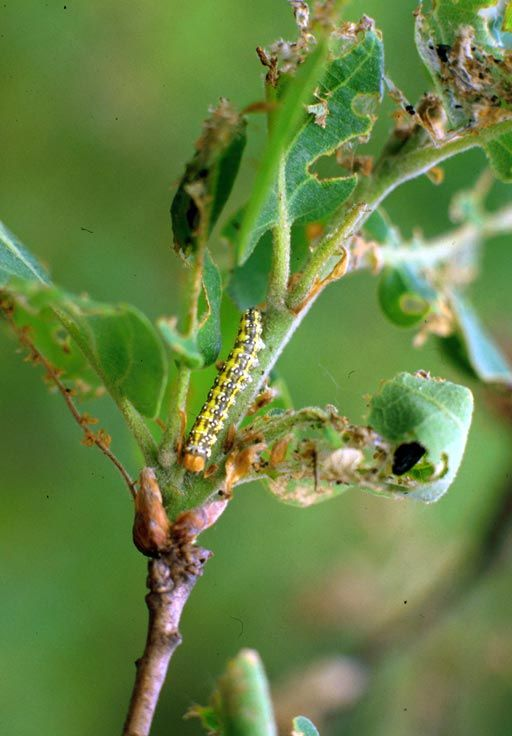
Caterpillar

== Description ==
The wingspan is 30–35 mm. The moth flies from April to May depending on the location.

== Biology ==
The larvae feed on oak (Quercus species). They are typically found from June to July, living within spun leaves.

== Subspecies ==
- Polyploca ridens ridens
- Polyploca ridens transmarina (Rungs, 1972) (Morocco)
