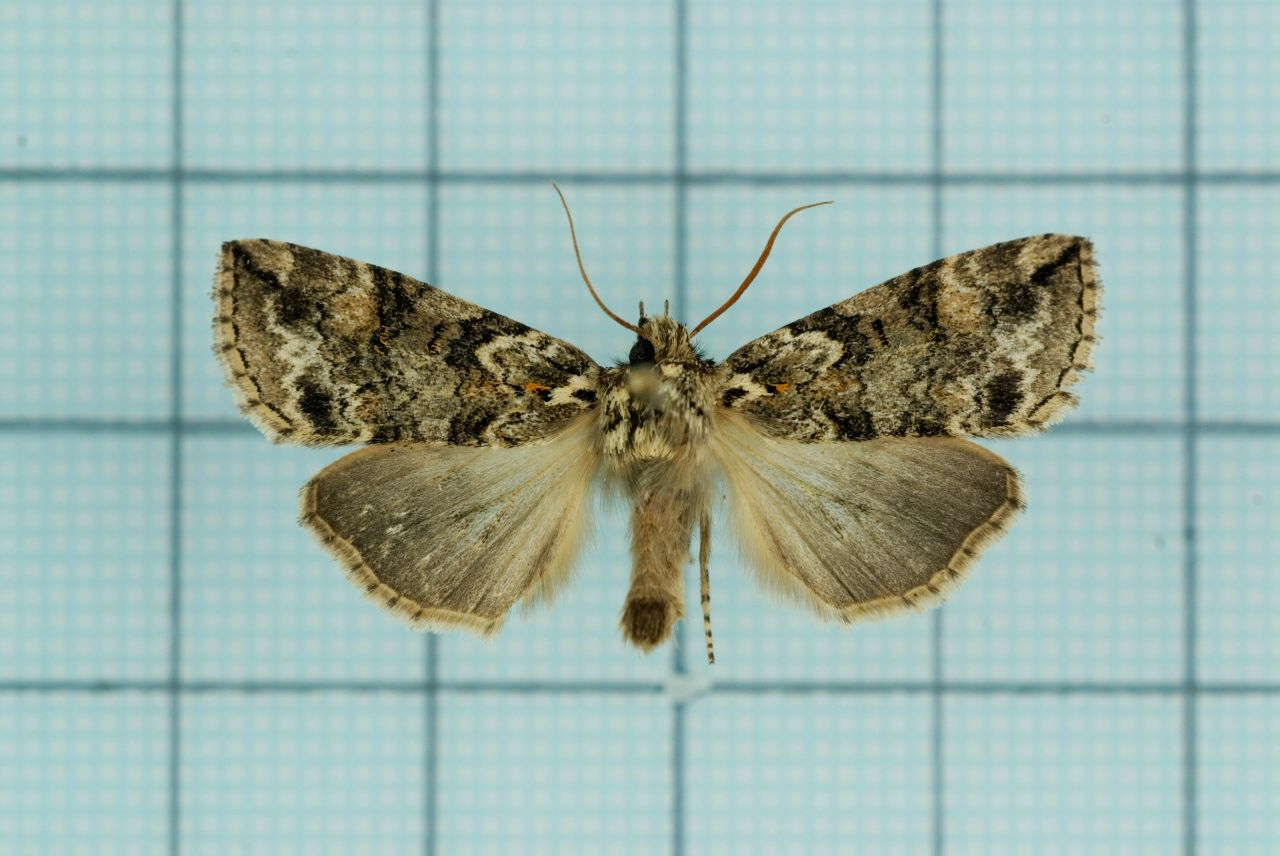
- Epipsestis dubia chengshinglini
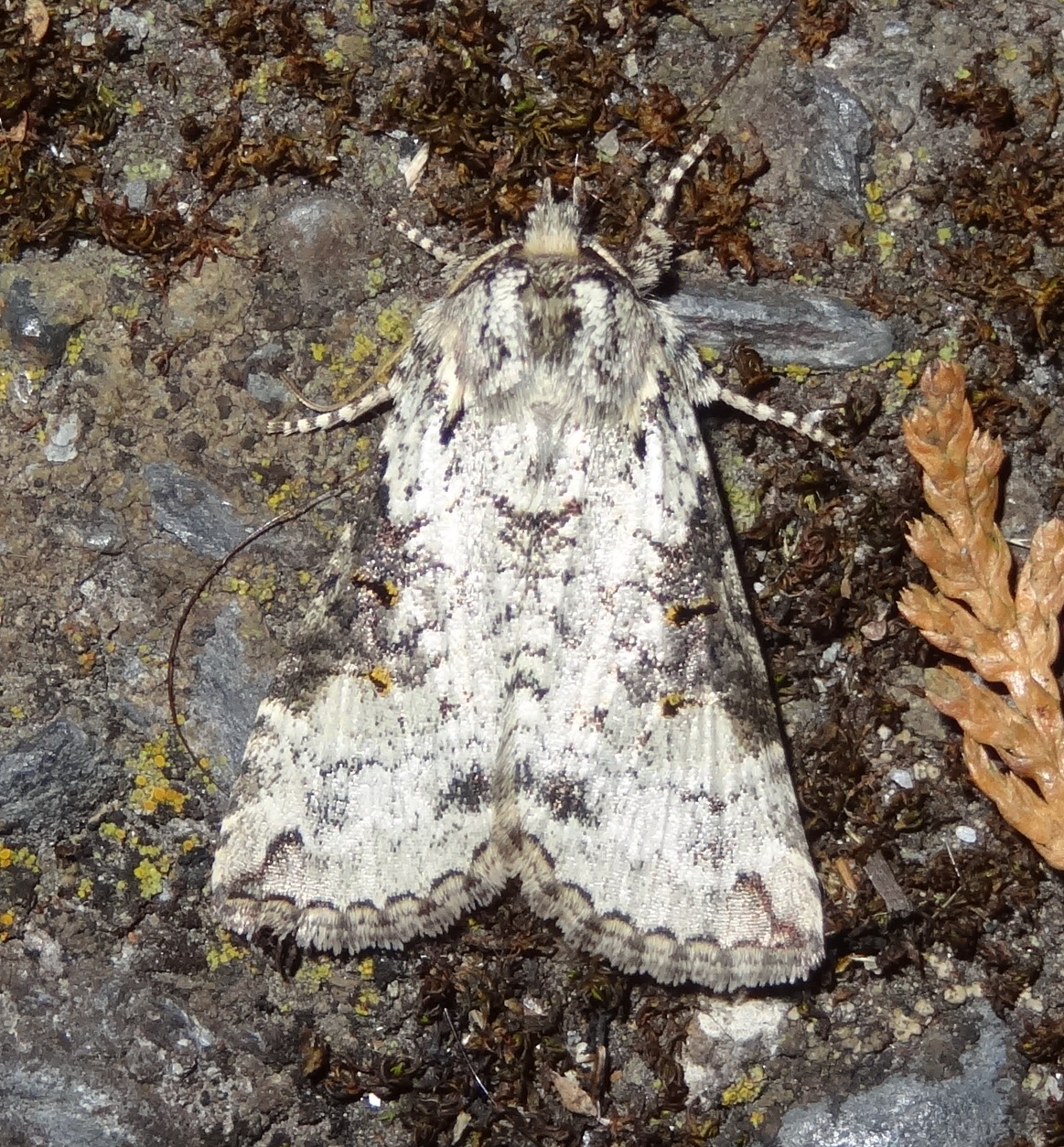
- E. d. chengshinglini

Scientific classification
- Domain: Eukaryota
- Kingdom: Animalia
- Phylum: Arthropoda
- Class: Insecta
- Order: Lepidoptera
- Family: Drepanidae
- Genus: Epipsestis
- Species: E. dubia

Binomial name
- Epipsestis dubia (Warren, 1888)

Synonyms
- Polyploca dubia Warren, 1888; Polyploca nigrifasciata Warren, 1915; Polyploca nigrifasciata ab. semifascia Warren, 1915; Polyploca nigrifasciata ab. nigrilineata Warren, 1915

= Epipsestis dubia =

Species of false owlet moth

Epipsestis dubia is a moth of the family Drepanidae first described by Warren in 1888. It is found from Kashmir to northern Vietnam and Taiwan (including India, Pakistan, China).

== Subspecies ==
- Epipsestis dubia dubia (India, Pakistan, Nepal, Myanmar, Vietnam, China: Hunan, Tibet)
- Epipsestis dubia chengshinglini Laszlo & G.Ronkay, 2000 (Taiwan)
