= Epipsestis albidisca =

Scientific classification
- Domain: Eukaryota
- Kingdom: Animalia
- Phylum: Arthropoda
- Class: Insecta
- Order: Lepidoptera
- Family: Drepanidae
- Genus: Epipsestis
- Species: E. albidisca

Binomial name
- Epipsestis albidisca (Warren, 1888)

Synonyms
- Polyploca albidisca Warren, 1888; Palimpsestis albidisca Moore, 1888; Polyploca polychromata Hampson, 1896

Species of false owlet moth

Epipsestis albidisca is a moth in the family Drepanidae. It is found in western India (Berham Gully, Kangra), Sikkim, Nepal, Pakistan, China (Yunnan, Tibet) and Vietnam.

The wingspan is about 34 mm. The forewings are greyish white with a greenish tinge. The extreme base is blackish with a tuft of raised white scales, followed by a pale grey sinuous band, indistinctly traversed by a darker central line, then a dark-edged darker sinuous fascia, also traversed by an indistinctly darker line. The external angle of this fascia below the costa is marked by a short vertical black dash of raised scales, representing the orbicular stigma, followed by a similar, but longer, black dash, slightly inclined to the former, representing the reniform stigma. Each of these black dashes is also edged with pale erect scales. Beyond the second dash are two or three angulated, and one sinuous dark line, following an indistinct central pale fascia, which is whitish on the inner margin. Midway between the sinuous dark line and the hind margin is a pale denticulated submarginal line, preceded by an irregular dark grey fascia. The extreme hind margin has a series of black lunules and there is a straight black dash from the apex to the submarginal line. The hindwings are dull grey.
