= Parapsestis meleagris =

Scientific classification
- Domain: Eukaryota
- Kingdom: Animalia
- Phylum: Arthropoda
- Class: Insecta
- Order: Lepidoptera
- Family: Drepanidae
- Genus: Parapsestis
- Species: P. meleagris

Binomial name
- Parapsestis meleagris Houlbert, 1921

Species of false owlet moth

Parapsestis meleagris is a moth in the family Drepanidae. It was described by Constant Vincent Houlbert in 1921. It is found in the Chinese provinces of Jilin, Shaanxi, Gansu, Zhejiang, Fujian, Jiangxi, Hubei, Hunan, Sichuan, Guizhou and Yunnan.
