= Epipsestis albicosta =

Scientific classification
- Kingdom: Animalia
- Phylum: Arthropoda
- Clade: Pancrustacea
- Class: Insecta
- Order: Lepidoptera
- Family: Drepanidae
- Genus: Epipsestis
- Species: E. albicosta

Binomial name
- Epipsestis albicosta Yoshimoto, 1993

Species of false owlet moth

Epipsestis albicosta is a moth in the family Drepanidae. It was described by Yoshimoto in 1993. It is found in Nepal.
