= Achlya jezoensis =

Scientific classification
- Kingdom: Animalia
- Phylum: Arthropoda
- Clade: Pancrustacea
- Class: Insecta
- Order: Lepidoptera
- Family: Drepanidae
- Genus: Achyla
- Species: A. jezoensis

Binomial name
- Achlya jezoensis (Matsumura, 1927)

Synonyms
- Daruma jezoensis Matsumura, 1927

Species of false owlet moth

Achlya jezoensis is a moth in the family Drepanidae. It was described by Shōnen Matsumura in 1927. It is found in Japan, China (Heilongjiang, Inner Mongolia), south-eastern Russia and the Korean Peninsula.
