= Epipsestis mediofusca =

Scientific classification
- Domain: Eukaryota
- Kingdom: Animalia
- Phylum: Arthropoda
- Class: Insecta
- Order: Lepidoptera
- Family: Drepanidae
- Genus: Epipsestis
- Species: E. mediofusca

Binomial name
- Epipsestis mediofusca Yoshimoto, 1982

Species of false owlet moth

Epipsestis mediofusca is a moth in the family Drepanidae described by Yoshimoto in 1982. It is found in Nepal and Tibet, China.

The wingspan is about 31 mm.
