= Horipsestis minutus =

Scientific classification
- Kingdom: Animalia
- Phylum: Arthropoda
- Clade: Pancrustacea
- Class: Insecta
- Order: Lepidoptera
- Family: Drepanidae
- Subfamily: Thyatirinae
- Genus: Horipsestis
- Species: H. minutus

Binomial name
- Horipsestis minutus (Forbes, 1936)

Synonyms
- Psidopaloides minutus Forbes, 1936; Psidopala minutus Forbes, 1936

Species of false owlet moth

Horipsestis minutus is a moth in the family Drepanidae. It is found in the Chinese provinces of Shaanxi, Hubei, Jiangxi, Guangxi, Sichuan and Yunnan.
