= Parapsestis dabashana =

Scientific classification
- Kingdom: Animalia
- Phylum: Arthropoda
- Clade: Pancrustacea
- Class: Insecta
- Order: Lepidoptera
- Family: Drepanidae
- Genus: Parapsestis
- Species: P. dabashana

Binomial name
- Parapsestis dabashana László, G. Ronkay, L. Ronkay & Witt, 2007

Species of false owlet moth

Parapsestis dabashana is a moth in the family Drepanidae. It was described by Gyula M. László, Gábor Ronkay, László Aladár Ronkay and Thomas Joseph Witt in 2007. It is found in the Chinese provinces of Shaanxi and Sichuan.
