= Parapsestis odilei =

Scientific classification
- Domain: Eukaryota
- Kingdom: Animalia
- Phylum: Arthropoda
- Class: Insecta
- Order: Lepidoptera
- Family: Drepanidae
- Genus: Parapsestis
- Species: P. odilei

Binomial name
- Parapsestis odilei Orhant, 2006

Species of false owlet moth

Parapsestis odilei is a moth in the family Drepanidae. It was described by Orhant in 2006. It is found in Thailand.
