= Achlya tateyamai =

Scientific classification
- Kingdom: Animalia
- Phylum: Arthropoda
- Class: Insecta
- Order: Lepidoptera
- Family: Drepanidae
- Genus: Achyla
- Species: A. tateyamai

Binomial name
- Achlya tateyamai Inoue, 1982

Synonyms
- Achlya longipennis inokoi Inoue in Inoue et al, 1982

Species of false owlet moth

Achlya tateyamai is a moth in the family Drepanidae. It was described by Hiroshi Inoue in 1982. It is found in Japan (Hokkaido).
