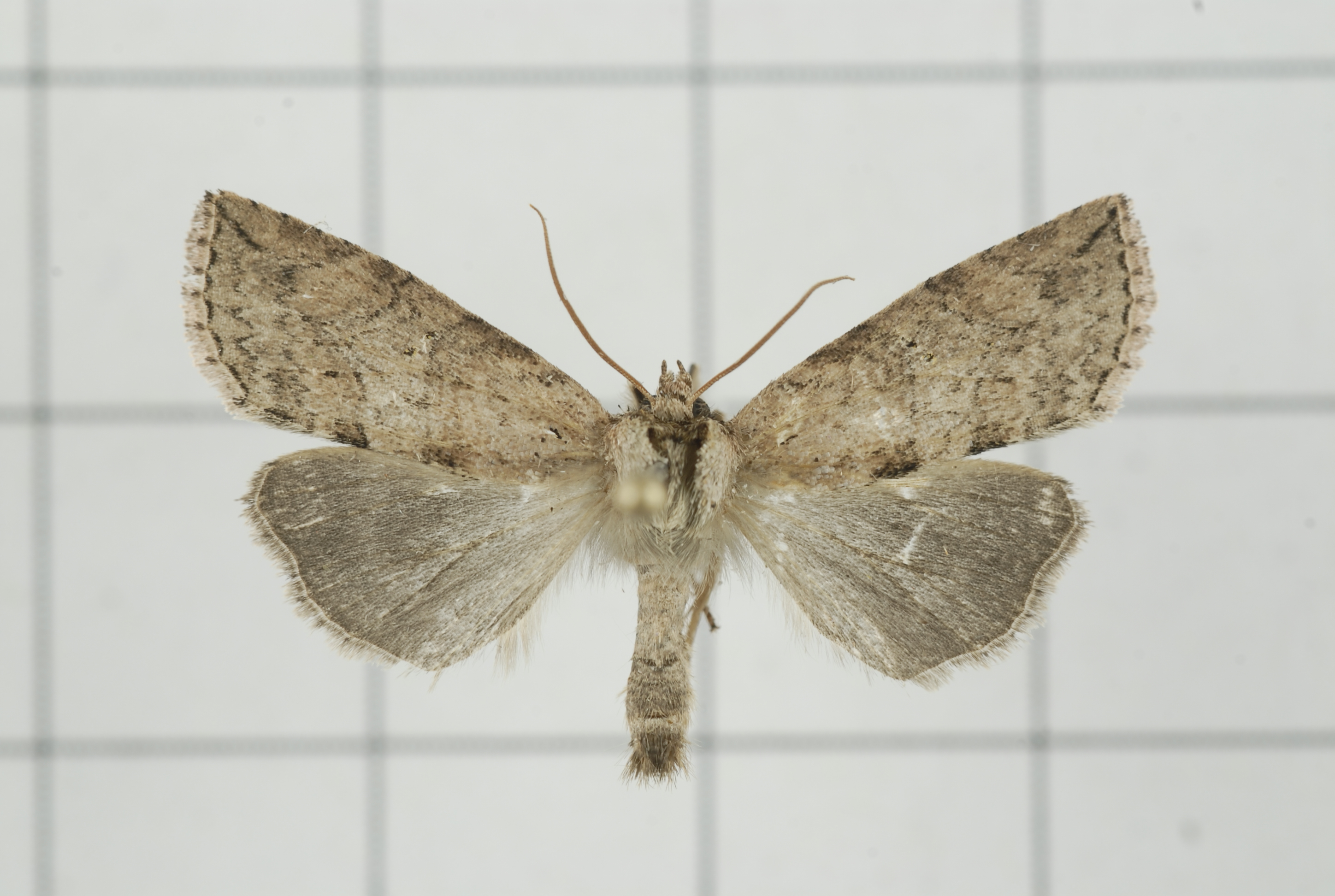

Scientific classification
- Domain: Eukaryota
- Kingdom: Animalia
- Phylum: Arthropoda
- Class: Insecta
- Order: Lepidoptera
- Family: Drepanidae
- Genus: Epipsestis
- Species: E. bilineata

Binomial name
- Epipsestis bilineata (Warren, 1915)

Synonyms
- Polyploca bilineata Warren, 1915; Polyploca acutangula Warren, 1915; Epipsestis acutangula

= Epipsestis bilineata =

Species of false owlet moth

Epipsestis bilineata is a moth of the family Drepanidae first described by Warren in 1915. It is found from India and Nepal to Taiwan.

== Subspecies ==
- Epipsestis bilineata bilineata (northern India, Nepal)
- Epipsestis bilineata pallida Yoshimoto, 1984 (Taiwan)
