= Epipsestis peregovitsi =

Scientific classification
- Domain: Eukaryota
- Kingdom: Animalia
- Phylum: Arthropoda
- Class: Insecta
- Order: Lepidoptera
- Family: Drepanidae
- Genus: Epipsestis
- Species: E. peregovitsi

Binomial name
- Epipsestis peregovitsi Laszlo & G. Ronkay, 2000

Species of false owlet moth

Epipsestis peregovitsi is a moth in the family Drepanidae. It was described by Gyula M. László and Gábor Ronkay in 2000. It is found in Vietnam, Guangdong in China, Nepal and Thailand.
