= Neotogaria baenzigeri =

Scientific classification
- Kingdom: Animalia
- Phylum: Arthropoda
- Clade: Pancrustacea
- Class: Insecta
- Order: Lepidoptera
- Family: Drepanidae
- Genus: Neotogaria
- Species: N. baenzigeri

Binomial name
- Neotogaria baenzigeri László, G. Ronkay, L. Ronkay & Witt, 2007

Species of false owlet moth

Neotogaria baenzigeri is a moth in the family Drepanidae. It was described by Gyula M. László, Gábor Ronkay, László Aladár Ronkay and Thomas Joseph Witt in 2007. It is found in Thailand.
