= Horipsestis kisvaczak =

Scientific classification
- Kingdom: Animalia
- Phylum: Arthropoda
- Clade: Pancrustacea
- Class: Insecta
- Order: Lepidoptera
- Family: Drepanidae
- Subfamily: Thyatirinae
- Genus: Horipsestis
- Species: H. kisvaczak

Binomial name
- Horipsestis kisvaczak Laszlo, G. Ronkay, L. Ronkay & Witt, 2007

Species of false owlet moth

Horipsestis kisvaczak is a moth in the family Drepanidae. It is found in Yunnan in China, Vietnam, Thailand and Laos.
