= Epipsestis wernyi =

Scientific classification
- Kingdom: Animalia
- Phylum: Arthropoda
- Clade: Pancrustacea
- Class: Insecta
- Order: Lepidoptera
- Family: Drepanidae
- Genus: Epipsestis
- Species: E. wernyi

Binomial name
- Epipsestis wernyi Laszlo, G.Ronkay, L.Ronkay & Witt, 2007

Species of false owlet moth

Epipsestis wernyi is a moth in the family Drepanidae. It is found in China (Shaanxi).
