= Parapsestis implicata =

Scientific classification
- Kingdom: Animalia
- Phylum: Arthropoda
- Clade: Pancrustacea
- Class: Insecta
- Order: Lepidoptera
- Family: Drepanidae
- Genus: Parapsestis
- Species: P. implicata

Binomial name
- Parapsestis implicata László, G. Ronkay, L. Ronkay & Witt, 2007

Species of false owlet moth

Parapsestis implicata is a moth in the family Drepanidae. It was described by Gyula M. László, Gábor Ronkay, László Aladár Ronkay and Thomas Joseph Witt in 2007. It is found in the Chinese provinces of Shaanxi, Sichuan and Hubei.
