= Neotogaria anguligera =

Scientific classification
- Kingdom: Animalia
- Phylum: Arthropoda
- Class: Insecta
- Order: Lepidoptera
- Family: Drepanidae
- Genus: Neotogaria
- Species: N. anguligera

Binomial name
- Neotogaria anguligera (Hampson, 1893)

Synonyms
- Polyploca anguligera Hampson, 1893

Species of false owlet moth

Neotogaria anguligera is a moth in the family Drepanidae first described by George Hampson in 1893. It is found in the Naga Hills of India.

The wingspan is about 42 mm. Adults are similar to Takapsestis orbicularis, but the double antemedial lines of the forewings are straighter and the double postmedial lines are highly angled outwards beyond the cell. Furthermore, the oblique streak from the apex is more prominent.
