= Parapsestis lichenea =

Scientific classification
- Kingdom: Animalia
- Phylum: Arthropoda
- Class: Insecta
- Order: Lepidoptera
- Family: Drepanidae
- Genus: Parapsestis
- Species: P. lichenea

Binomial name
- Parapsestis lichenea (Hampson, 1893)

Synonyms
- Gaurena lichenea Hampson, 1893; Cymatophora candida Houlbert, 1921

Species of false owlet moth

Parapsestis lichenea is a moth in the family Drepanidae. It was described by George Hampson in 1893. It is found in Sikkim in India, Myanmar, Thailand, Vietnam and the Chinese provinces of Henan, Shaanxi, Zhejiang, Hubei, Fujian, Sichuan, Yunnan and Tibet.

The wingspan is about 38 mm. The forewings are whitish grey, crossed by numerous waved dark lines. There are indistinct antemedial, postmedial and submarginal curved dark bands and the orbicular and reniform spots are indistinct, the former figure-of-8 shaped, the latter elongate. There is also an oblique black apical streak and a marginal lunulate line. The hindwings are white with an indistinct medial fuscous line and a broad blackish marginal band.

== Subspecies ==
- Parapsestis lichenea lichenea (India: Sikkim)
- Parapsestis lichenea splendida Laszlo, G. Ronkay, L. Ronkay & Witt, 2007 (Myanmar, Thailand, Vietnam, China: Yunnan, Tibet)
- Parapsestis lichenea tsinlinga Laszlo, G. Ronkay, L. Ronkay & Witt, 2007 (China: Henan, Shaanxi, Zhejiang, Hubei, Fujian, Sichuan)
