= Polyploca latens =

Scientific classification
- Kingdom: Animalia
- Phylum: Arthropoda
- Clade: Pancrustacea
- Class: Insecta
- Order: Lepidoptera
- Family: Drepanidae
- Genus: Polyploca
- Species: P. latens

Binomial name
- Polyploca latens Laszlo, G.Ronkay, L.Ronkay & Witt, 2008

Species of false owlet moth

Polyploca latens is a moth in the family Drepanidae. It is found in Azerbaijan.
