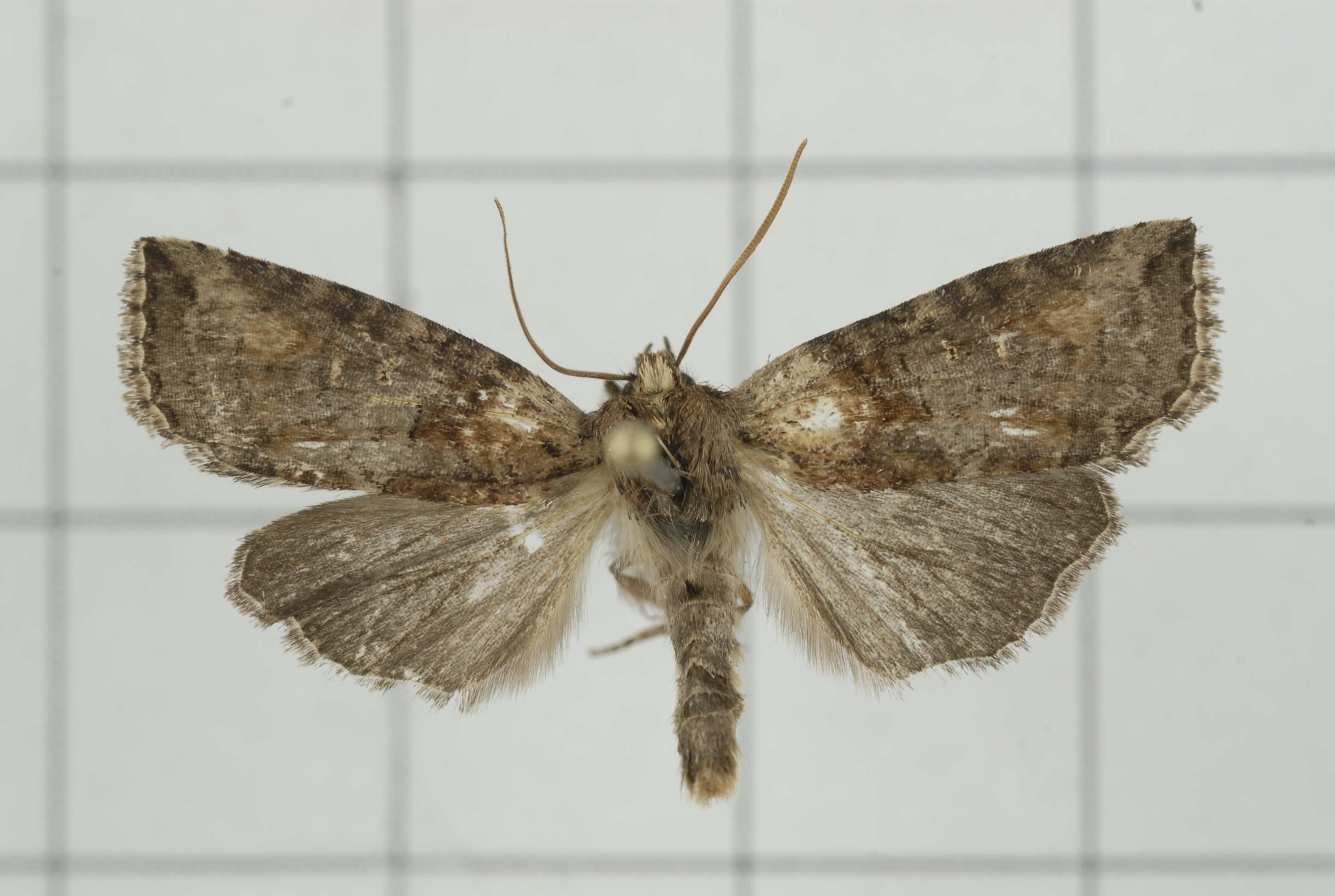

Scientific classification
- Domain: Eukaryota
- Kingdom: Animalia
- Phylum: Arthropoda
- Class: Insecta
- Order: Lepidoptera
- Family: Drepanidae
- Genus: Epipsestis
- Species: E. cortigera

Binomial name
- Epipsestis cortigera Yoshimoto, 1995

= Epipsestis cortigera =

Species of false owlet moth

Epipsestis cortigera is a moth of the family Drepanidae first described by Yoshimoto in 1995. It is found in Taiwan.

The wingspan is about 28 mm.
