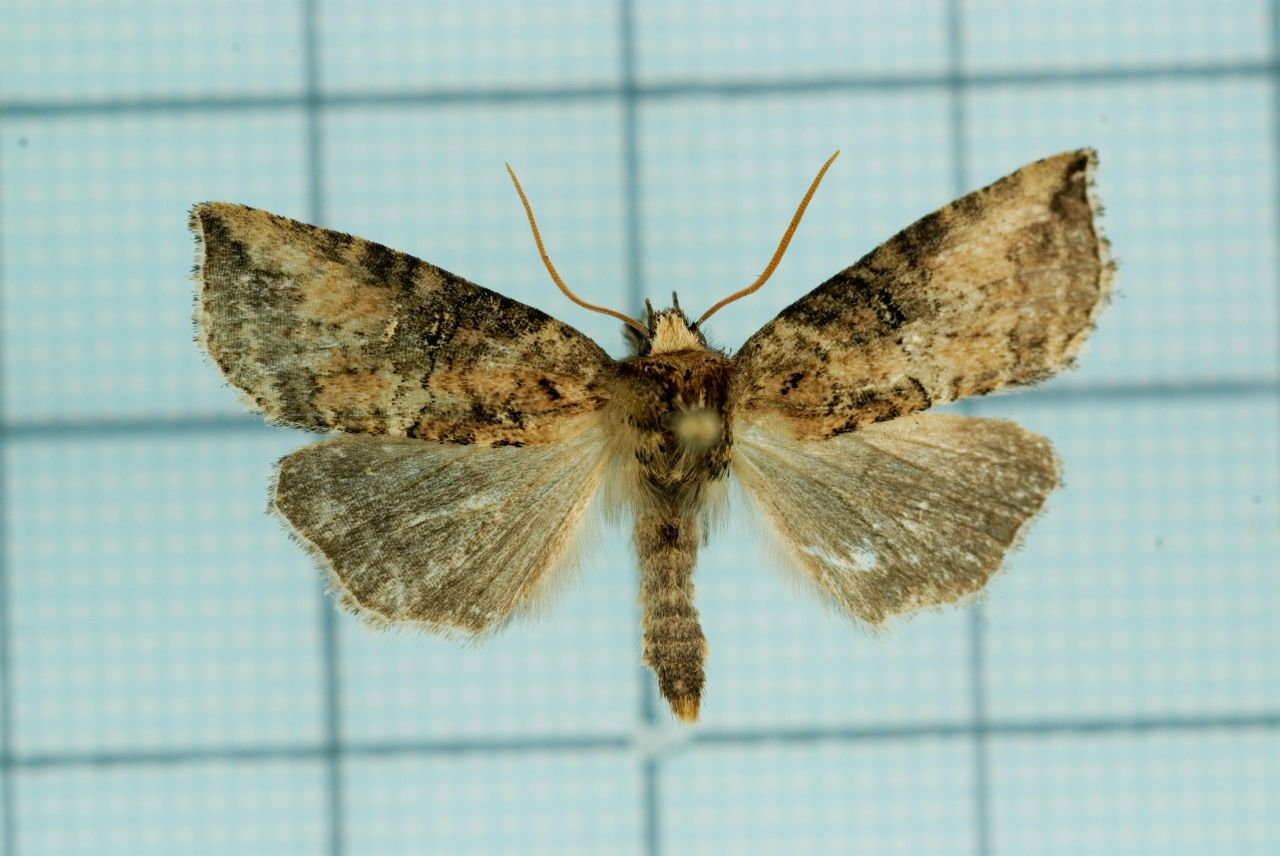

Scientific classification
- Domain: Eukaryota
- Kingdom: Animalia
- Phylum: Arthropoda
- Class: Insecta
- Order: Lepidoptera
- Family: Drepanidae
- Genus: Epipsestis
- Species: E. nikkoensis

Binomial name
- Epipsestis nikkoensis (Matsumura, 1921)

Synonyms
- Polyploca nikkoensis Matsumura, 1921

= Epipsestis nikkoensis =

Species of false owlet moth

Epipsestis nikkoensis is a moth of the family Drepanidae first described by Shōnen Matsumura in 1921. It is found in the Chinese provinces of Jilin, Shaanxi and Hubei and in Japan, Taiwan, the Russian Far East, Nepal, Bhutan, Myanmar, the Korean Peninsula, Thailand and northern Vietnam. The specific epithet nikkoensis is derived from Nikkō, the type locality of the species.
