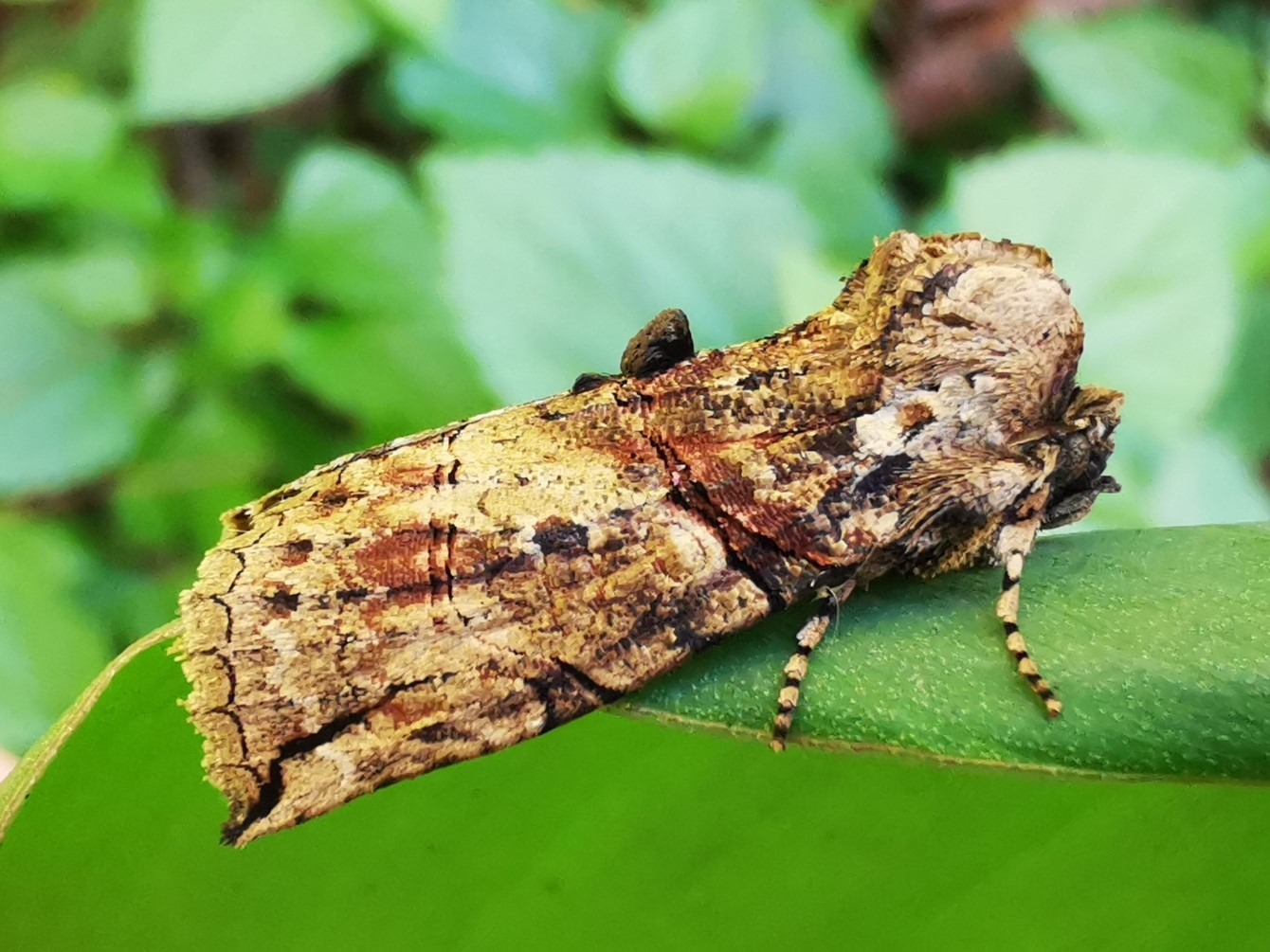

Scientific classification
- Domain: Eukaryota
- Kingdom: Animalia
- Phylum: Arthropoda
- Class: Insecta
- Order: Lepidoptera
- Family: Drepanidae
- Genus: Neotogaria
- Species: N. thomaswitti

Binomial name
- Neotogaria thomaswitti László, G. Ronkay & L. Ronkay, 2007

= Neotogaria thomaswitti =

Species of false owlet moth

Neotogaria thomaswitti is a species of moth in the family Drepanidae. It was described by Gyula M. László, Gábor Ronkay and László Aladár Ronkay in 2007. It is found in Thailand.
