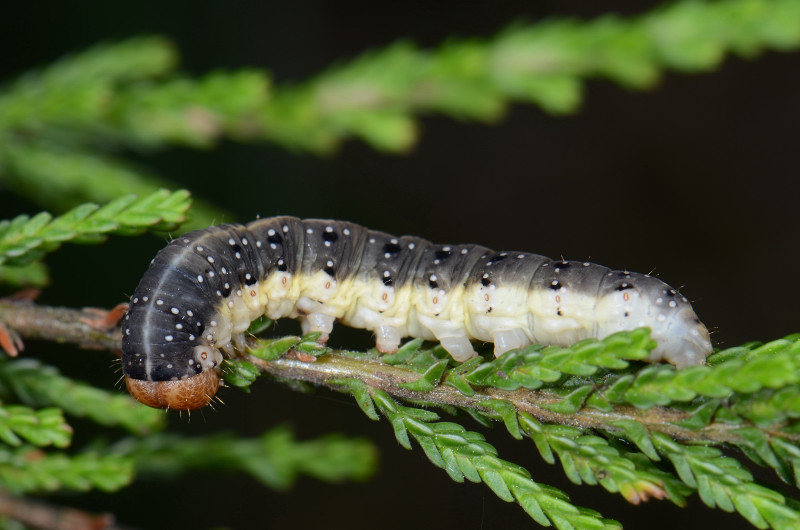
- Achlya flavicornis larva

Scientific classification
- Domain: Eukaryota
- Kingdom: Animalia
- Phylum: Arthropoda
- Class: Insecta
- Order: Lepidoptera
- Family: Drepanidae
- Subfamily: Thyatirinae
- Genus: Achyla; Billberg, 1820

Synonyms
- Chymatophora Guenée, 1837; Cymathophora Duponchel, 1829; Cymatophora Treitschke, 1825; Daruma Matsumura, 1927; Darumona Strand, 1935; Kymatophora Treitschke, 1835; Sugitaniella Matsumura, 1933

= Achlya (moth) =

Genus of moths

Achlya is a genus of moths belonging to the subfamily Thyatirinae of the Drepanidae.

== Species ==
- Achlya flavicornis Linnaeus, 1758
- Achlya jezoensis (Matsumura, 1927)
- Achlya hoerburgeri (Schawerda, 1924)
- Achlya longipennis Inoue, 1972
- Achlya tateyamai Inoue, 1982

== Former species ==
- Achlya kuramana Matsumura, 1933
