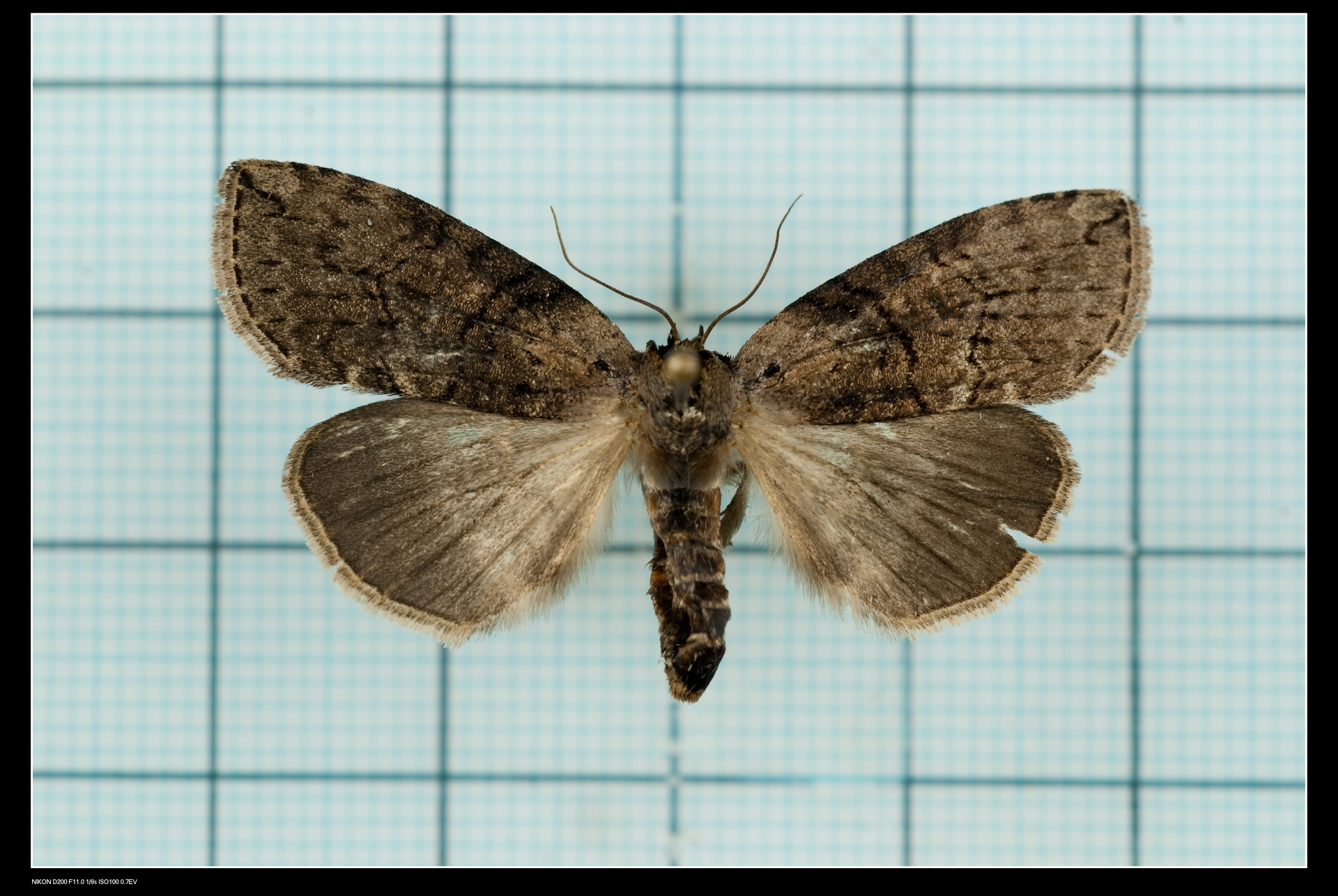

Scientific classification
- Kingdom: Animalia
- Phylum: Arthropoda
- Clade: Pancrustacea
- Class: Insecta
- Order: Lepidoptera
- Family: Drepanidae
- Subfamily: Thyatirinae
- Genus: Horipsestis; Matsumura, 1933

Synonyms
- Neochropacha Inoue, 1982

= Horipsestis =

Moth genus in family Drepanidae

Horipsestis is a genus of moths belonging to the subfamily Thyatirinae of the Drepanidae.

== Species ==
- Horipsestis aenea (Wileman, 1911)
- Horipsestis angusta Yoshimoto, 1996
- Horipsestis kisvaczak Laszlo, G.Ronkay, L.Ronkay & Witt, 2007
- Horipsestis minutus (Forbes, 1936)
- Horipsestis mushana (Matsumura, 1931)
