= Takapsestis bifasciata =

Scientific classification
- Kingdom: Animalia
- Phylum: Arthropoda
- Class: Insecta
- Order: Lepidoptera
- Family: Drepanidae
- Genus: Takapsestis
- Species: T. bifasciata

Binomial name
- Takapsestis bifasciata (Hampson, 1895)

Synonyms
- Polyploca bifasciata Hampson, 1895; Takapsestis nepalensis Yoshimoto, 1992; Takapsestis harutai Yoshimoto, 1994

Species of false owlet moth

Takapsestis bifasciata is a moth in the family Drepanidae described by George Hampson in 1895. It is found in the Indian state of Sikkim and in Nepal.

The wingspan is about 40 mm. Adults are silvery greyish white, the forewings with diffused antemedial and postmedial fuscous bands, the former with slightly waved edges and oblique, the latter slightly excurved at the middle. There is also a fine oblique apical streak.
