= Toelgyfaloca albogrisea =

Scientific classification
- Kingdom: Animalia
- Phylum: Arthropoda
- Clade: Pancrustacea
- Class: Insecta
- Order: Lepidoptera
- Family: Drepanidae
- Genus: Toelgyfaloca
- Species: T. albogrisea

Binomial name
- Toelgyfaloca albogrisea (Mell, 1942)

Synonyms
- Spilobasis albogrisea Mell, 1942; Mimopsestis albogrisea

Species of false owlet moth

Toelgyfaloca albogrisea is a moth in the family Drepanidae. It was described by Rudolf Mell in 1942. It is found in the Chinese provinces of Jiangxi, Hunan, Fujian, Guangdong and Sichuan.
