= Epipsestis nigropunctata =

Scientific classification
- Domain: Eukaryota
- Kingdom: Animalia
- Phylum: Arthropoda
- Class: Insecta
- Order: Lepidoptera
- Family: Drepanidae
- Genus: Epipsestis
- Species: E. nigropunctata

Binomial name
- Epipsestis nigropunctata (Sick, 1941)

Synonyms
- Polyploca nigropunctata Sick, 1941; Epipsestis perornata sicki Yoshimoto, 1988

Species of false owlet moth

Epipsestis nigropunctata is a moth in the family Drepanidae. It is found in China, Japan (Hokkaido, Honshu, Shikoku), Korea, the Russian Far East and Nepal.

The larvae feed on Quercus mongolica.

== Subspecies ==
- Epipsestis nigropunctata nigropunctata (Nepal, China: Yunnan)
- Epipsestis nigropunctata perornata Inoue, 1972 (south-eastern Russia, Japan, Korean Peninsula, China: Shaanxi)
