= Epipsestis castaneata =

Scientific classification
- Domain: Eukaryota
- Kingdom: Animalia
- Phylum: Arthropoda
- Class: Insecta
- Order: Lepidoptera
- Family: Drepanidae
- Genus: Epipsestis
- Species: E. castaneata

Binomial name
- Epipsestis castaneata (Warren, 1915)

Synonyms
- Polyploca castaneata Warren, 1915

Species of false owlet moth

Epipsestis castaneata is a moth in the family Drepanidae. It was described by Warren in 1915. It is found in Sikkim in India, Hunan in China and in Nepal and Vietnam.

The wingspan is about 34 mm. The forewings are fawn coloured, shaded on each side of the narrow central area and along the inner margin in the basal half with dull chestnut brown. There is an oblique black streak near the base on the submedian fold. The inner line just before the middle is black, slightly curved, and indented on each fold, preceded by two curved brown shades, the inner strongly outcurved at the middle. The median fascia is extremely narrow, towards the inner margin whitish and the outer line is blackish, slender, crenulate and slightly projecting on vein 4, followed by two thick brown shades with deeper centres, and then by a black lunulate-dentate line, angled above vein 5. The subterminal line is pale fawn between darker shades, met at vein 6 by a thick somewhat interrupted streak from the apex. There is a row of fine black lunules before the termen and the orbicular and reniform stigmata are represented by linear black marks of raised scales, with some paler scales on their inner edge, lying on the inner and outer lines respectively. The hindwings are brownish fuscous.
