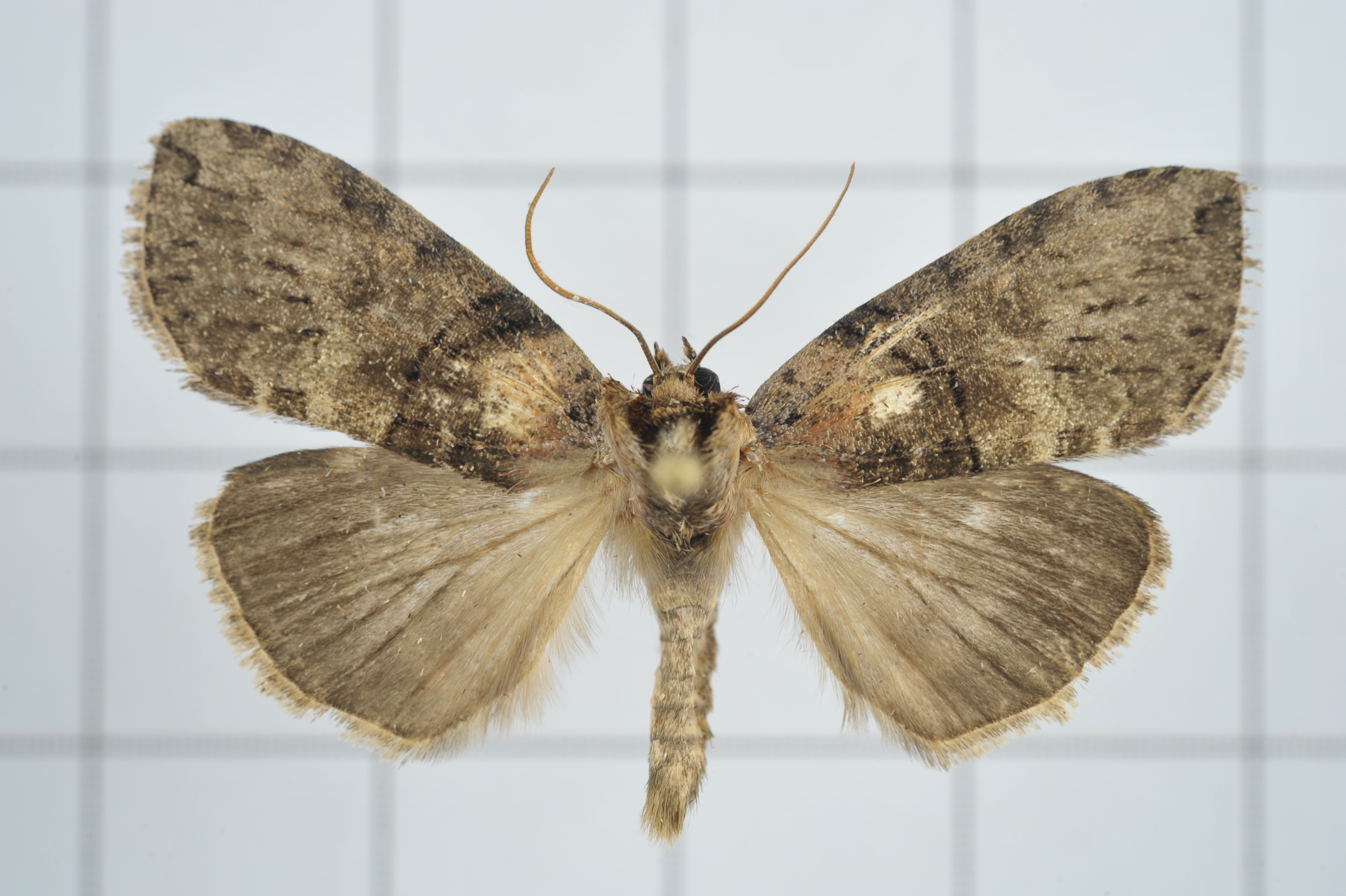

Scientific classification
- Domain: Eukaryota
- Kingdom: Animalia
- Phylum: Arthropoda
- Class: Insecta
- Order: Lepidoptera
- Family: Drepanidae
- Subfamily: Thyatirinae
- Genus: Horipsestis
- Species: H. aenea

Binomial name
- Horipsestis aenea (Wileman, 1911)

Synonyms
- Polyploca aenea Wileman, 1911; Horipsestis teikichiana Matsumura, 1933; Spilobasis minor Sick, 1941

= Horipsestis aenea =

Species of false owlet moth

Horipsestis aenea is a moth in the family Drepanidae. It was described by Wileman in 1911. It is found in Taiwan, the Chinese provinces of Henan, Shaanxi, Gansu, Hubei, Jiangxi, Hunan, Fujian, Guangxi, Hainan, Sichuan and Yunnan and in Vietnam.

== Subspecies ==
- Horipsestis aenea aenea (Taiwan)
- Horipsestis aenea minor (Sick, 1941) (China: Henan, Shaanxi, Gansu, Hubei, Jiangxi, Hunan, Fujian, Guangxi, Hainan, Sichuan, Yunnan)
- Horipsestis aenea roseobasalis Laszlo, G. Ronkay, L. Ronkay & Witt, 2007 (Vietnam)
