= Toelgyfaloca circumdata =

Scientific classification
- Domain: Eukaryota
- Kingdom: Animalia
- Phylum: Arthropoda
- Class: Insecta
- Order: Lepidoptera
- Family: Drepanidae
- Genus: Toelgyfaloca
- Species: T. circumdata

Binomial name
- Toelgyfaloca circumdata (Houlbert, 1921)

Synonyms
- Spilobasis circumdata Houlbert, 1921; Mimopsestis circumdata

Species of false owlet moth

Toelgyfaloca circumdata is a moth in the family Drepanidae. It was described by Constant Vincent Houlbert in 1921. It is found in China in Beijing, Shanxi, Henan, Shaanxi, Gansu, Hubei, Sichuan and Yunnan.
