= Parapsestis pseudomaculata =

Scientific classification
- Kingdom: Animalia
- Phylum: Arthropoda
- Clade: Pancrustacea
- Class: Insecta
- Order: Lepidoptera
- Family: Drepanidae
- Genus: Parapsestis
- Species: P. pseudomaculata

Binomial name
- Parapsestis pseudomaculata (Houlbert, 1921)

Synonyms
- Spilobasis pseudomaculata Houlbert, 1921; Mimopsestis determinata Bryk, 1943; Mimopsestis pseudomaculata Houlbert, 1921

Species of false owlet moth

Parapsestis pseudomaculata is a moth in the family Drepanidae. It was described by Constant Vincent Houlbert in 1921. It is found in the Chinese provinces of Shaanxi, Gansu, Hubei, Hunan, Sichuan and Yunnan and in Myanmar.

== Synonyms ==
- Spilobasis pseudomaculata
- Mimopsestis determinata
