= Takapsestis curvicosta =

Scientific classification
- Domain: Eukaryota
- Kingdom: Animalia
- Phylum: Arthropoda
- Class: Insecta
- Order: Lepidoptera
- Family: Drepanidae
- Genus: Takapsestis
- Species: T. curvicosta

Binomial name
- Takapsestis curvicosta (Warren, 1915)

Synonyms
- Polyploca curvicosta Warren, 1915

Species of false owlet moth

Takapsestis curvicosta is a moth in the family Drepanidae. It is found in Assam, India.

The wingspan is about 32 mm. The forewings are dull grey tinged with brownish. The inner line is fine and black, found at one-third, curved and bent on the submedian fold. It is preceded by two dark lines at the costa, which become divergent and double towards the inner margin, more or less filled in with dark, forming a band. There is also a black spot near the base of the submedian fold, followed by a tuft of pale scales. The outer line is fine and black, with another parallel close beyond it, outcurved above, bent inwards at vein 4, and indented on the submedian fold, where it approaches the inner line. It is followed by two dark-grey outcurved strongly lunulate-dentate lines. The subterminal line is pale, lunulate and followed by dark lunulate marks and met by a strong black streak from the apex. There is also a fine black terminal festoon. The hindwings are fuscous brown, but darker along the termen.
