= Neotogaria galema =

Scientific classification
- Domain: Eukaryota
- Kingdom: Animalia
- Phylum: Arthropoda
- Class: Insecta
- Order: Lepidoptera
- Family: Drepanidae
- Genus: Neotogaria
- Species: N. galema

Binomial name
- Neotogaria galema (Swinhoe, 1894)

Synonyms
- Polyploca galema Swinhoe, 1894

Species of false owlet moth

Neotogaria galema is a moth in the family Drepanidae first described by Swinhoe in 1894. It is found in Bangladesh.

The wingspan is about 48 mm. Adults are pale brown, the forewings with a subbasal dark line which is highly angled below the median nervure. There is an antemedial double obliquely curved line slightly widening and filled in with dark brown towards the costa. The area between it and the subbasal line is darker than the ground colour, with an indistinct waved line on it. There is also a small dark round spot at the middle of the cell, with an indistinct highly crenulate medial line curving round it. There is also a slightly sinuous curved double postmedial line dilated and filled in with dark brown at the costa and there are two indistinct waved submarginal lines, as well as an oblique bent black streak from the apex and a fine dentate black marginal line. The hindwings are fuscous brown, with a dark line through the cilia.
