= Achlya hoerburgeri =

Scientific classification
- Domain: Eukaryota
- Kingdom: Animalia
- Phylum: Arthropoda
- Class: Insecta
- Order: Lepidoptera
- Family: Drepanidae
- Genus: Achyla
- Species: A. hoerburgeri

Binomial name
- Achlya hoerburgeri (Schawerda, 1924)

Synonyms
- Polyploca hoerburgeri Schawerda, 1924

Species of false owlet moth

Achlya hoerburgeri is a moth in the family Drepanidae. It was described by Schawerda in 1924. It is found in the Russian Far East. The habitat consists of mixed and broad-leaved forests with oak.
