= Takapsestis semiobsoleta =

Scientific classification
- Domain: Eukaryota
- Kingdom: Animalia
- Phylum: Arthropoda
- Class: Insecta
- Order: Lepidoptera
- Family: Drepanidae
- Genus: Takapsestis
- Species: T. semiobsoleta

Binomial name
- Takapsestis semiobsoleta (Warren, 1915)

Synonyms
- Palimpsestes semiobsoleta Warren, 1915; Polyploca semiobsoleta; Neogaurena grisescens Roepke, 1944; Polyploca orbicularis f. sumatrensis Gaede, 1930

Species of false owlet moth

Takapsestis semiobsoleta is a moth in the family Drepanidae. It is found in Indonesia (Java, Sumatra).

The forewings are pearl grey, the subbasal line angled outwards below the costa and forming an oblique black dash near the base of the submedian fold, with a reddish tinge around and below it. The inner line is bigeminate, forming a dark band and the innermost line is divergent and marked with a black spot on vein 1. The outermost line is blackest, oblique and excurved below the middle, then indented. The space beyond is grey with the lines subobsolete and the outer line is treble, marked on the costa mainly and followed at a distance by another equally obscure line, and preceded by a crenulate median line, which passes between the stigmata. The subterminal line is indicated by some black marks, ending in a curved black streak to the apex. Close before the termen is a row of black dashes between the veins. The hindwings are pale dull grey, with a broad fuscous terminal border and indistinct dark outer band.

== Subspecies ==
- Takapsestis semiobsoleta semiobsoleta (Java)
- Takapsestis semiobsoleta sumatrensis (Gaede, 1930) (Sumatra)
