= Neotogaria flammifera =

Scientific classification
- Domain: Eukaryota
- Kingdom: Animalia
- Phylum: Arthropoda
- Class: Insecta
- Order: Lepidoptera
- Family: Drepanidae
- Genus: Neotogaria
- Species: N. flammifera

Binomial name
- Neotogaria flammifera (Houlbert, 1921)

Synonyms
- Spilobasis flammifera Houlbert, 1921; Spilobasis curvata Sick, 1941; Mimopsestis flammifera Houlbert, 1921

Species of false owlet moth

Neotogaria flammifera is a moth in the family Drepanidae. It was described by Constant Vincent Houlbert in 1921. It is found in China (Shaanxi, Zhejiang, Hubei, Jiangxi, Hunan, Fujian, Taiwan, Yunnan) and Vietnam.
