= Takapsestis orbicularis =

Scientific classification
- Domain: Eukaryota
- Kingdom: Animalia
- Phylum: Arthropoda
- Class: Insecta
- Order: Lepidoptera
- Family: Drepanidae
- Genus: Takapsestis
- Species: T. orbicularis

Binomial name
- Takapsestis orbicularis (Moore, 1888)

Synonyms
- Palimpsestis orbicularis Moore, 1888; Polyploca griseata Warren, 1915; Epipsestis orbicularis Moore, 1888

Species of false owlet moth

Takapsestis orbicularis is a moth in the family Drepanidae. It is found in India.

The wingspan is about 42 mm. The forewings are dull cinereous, speckled with blackish, most thickly in the terminal area. There is a blackish spot at the base on the submedian fold. The inner line is black, before one-third, evenly outcurved and sinuate on vein 1, preceded by two indistinct dark parallel lines. The basal area is limited by a thicker curved wavy line and the outer line is black, concave outwards from the costa to vein 4, on which it is bent, then oblique inwards to the submedian fold, and vertically sinuous to the inner margin, followed immediately by a dark parallel line and at a distance by a dark wavy line. The subterminal line is pale grey between blackish shades, met by a curved black streak from the apex and there is a black terminal festoon. The stigmata is pale with black outlines and the orbicular is large and rounded, while the reniform is narrow, inwardly oblique and with a dark linear centre. The orbicular is filled up with dull yellowish. The hindwings are fuscous with darker veins.
