= Betapsestis umbrosa =

Scientific classification
- Kingdom: Animalia
- Phylum: Arthropoda
- Clade: Pancrustacea
- Class: Insecta
- Order: Lepidoptera
- Family: Drepanidae
- Genus: Betapsestis
- Species: B. umbrosa

Binomial name
- Betapsestis umbrosa (Wileman, 1911)

Synonyms
- Nemacerota umbrosa Wileman, 1911; Betapsestis takeuchii Matsumura, 1921

Species of false owlet moth

Betapsestis umbrosa is a moth in the family Drepanidae. It was described by Alfred Ernest Wileman in 1911. It is found in Japan.
