= Neotogaria hoenei =

Scientific classification
- Domain: Eukaryota
- Kingdom: Animalia
- Phylum: Arthropoda
- Class: Insecta
- Order: Lepidoptera
- Family: Drepanidae
- Genus: Neotogaria
- Species: N. hoenei

Binomial name
- Neotogaria hoenei (Sick, 1941)

Synonyms
- Spilobasis hoenei Sick, 1941; Polyploca honei

Species of false owlet moth

Neotogaria hoenei is a moth in the family Drepanidae. It is found in China (Guangdong, Yunnan) and Thailand.
