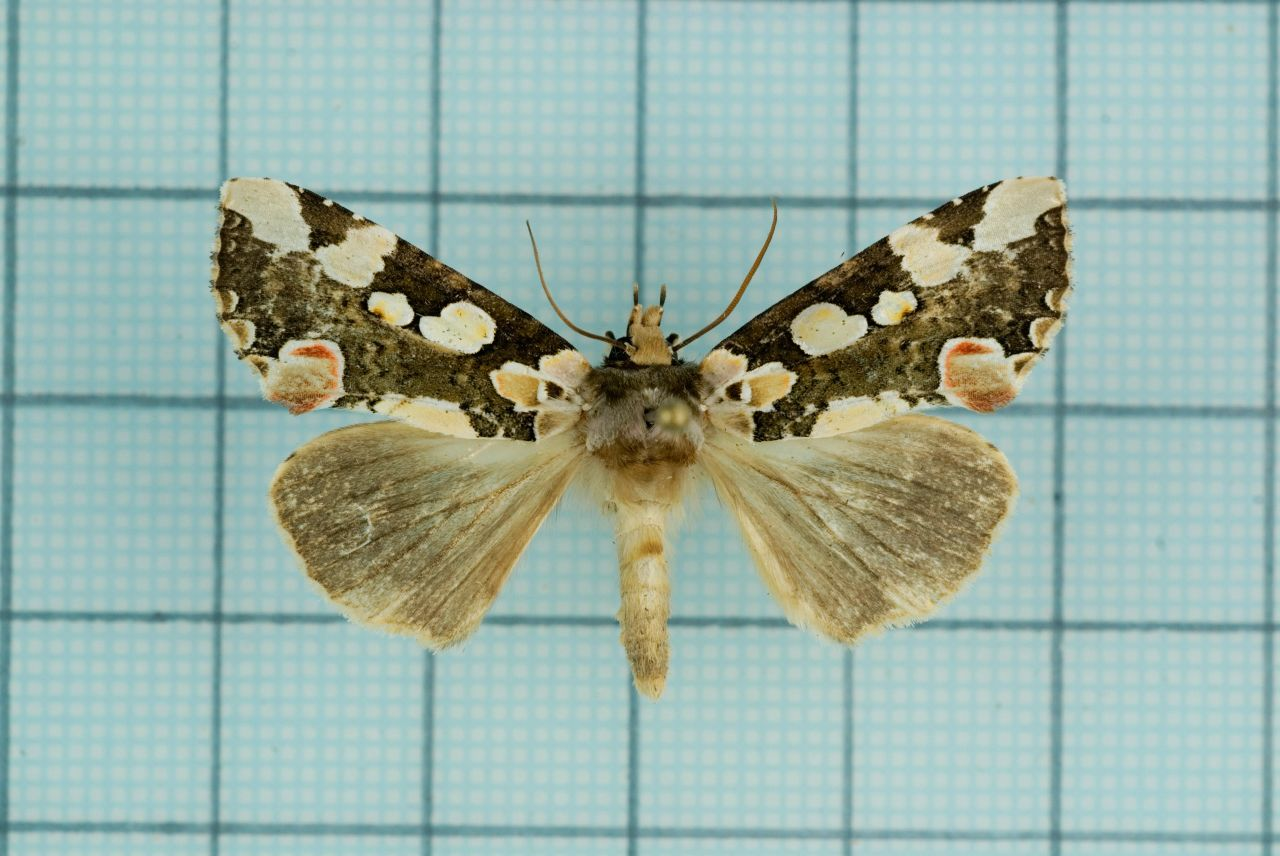
- sex-female.

Scientific classification
- Kingdom: Animalia
- Phylum: Arthropoda
- Clade: Pancrustacea
- Class: Insecta
- Order: Lepidoptera
- Family: Drepanidae
- Subfamily: Thyatirinae
- Genus: Horithyatira; Matsumura, 1933

= Horithyatira =

Moth genus in family Drepanidae

Horithyatira is a genus of moths belonging to the subfamily Thyatirinae of the Drepanidae.

== Species ==
- Horithyatira decorata (Moore, 1881)
- Horithyatira diehli (Werny, 1966)
- Horithyatira javanica (Werny, 1966)
- Horithyatira ornata (Roepke, 1944)

== Excluded species ==
- Horithyatira delattini is now Thyatira delattini Werny, 1966
