= Thyatira brasiliensis =

Scientific classification
- Domain: Eukaryota
- Kingdom: Animalia
- Phylum: Arthropoda
- Class: Insecta
- Order: Lepidoptera
- Family: Drepanidae
- Genus: Thyatira
- Species: T. brasiliensis

Binomial name
- Thyatira brasiliensis Werny, 1966

Species of false owlet moth

Thyatira brasiliensis is a moth in the family Drepanidae. It was described by Werny in 1966. It is found in Brazil.
