= Horithyatira ornata =

Scientific classification
- Domain: Eukaryota
- Kingdom: Animalia
- Phylum: Arthropoda
- Class: Insecta
- Order: Lepidoptera
- Family: Drepanidae
- Genus: Horithyatira
- Species: H. ornata

Binomial name
- Horithyatira ornata (Roepke, 1944)

Synonyms
- Gaurena ornata Roepke, 1944

Species of false owlet moth

Horithyatira ornata is a moth in the family Drepanidae. It is found in Indonesia (Java).
