= Horithyatira javanica =

Scientific classification
- Domain: Eukaryota
- Kingdom: Animalia
- Phylum: Arthropoda
- Class: Insecta
- Order: Lepidoptera
- Family: Drepanidae
- Genus: Horithyatira
- Species: H. javanica

Binomial name
- Horithyatira javanica Werny, 1966

Synonyms
- Horithyatira diehli javanica Werny, 1966

Species of false owlet moth

Horithyatira javanica is a moth in the family Drepanidae. It is found in Indonesia (Java).
