= Thyatira tama =

Scientific classification
- Domain: Eukaryota
- Kingdom: Animalia
- Phylum: Arthropoda
- Class: Insecta
- Order: Lepidoptera
- Family: Drepanidae
- Genus: Thyatira
- Species: T. tama

Binomial name
- Thyatira tama Schaus, 1933

Species of false owlet moth

Thyatira tama is a moth in the family Drepanidae. It was described by William Schaus in 1933. It is found in Colombia.
