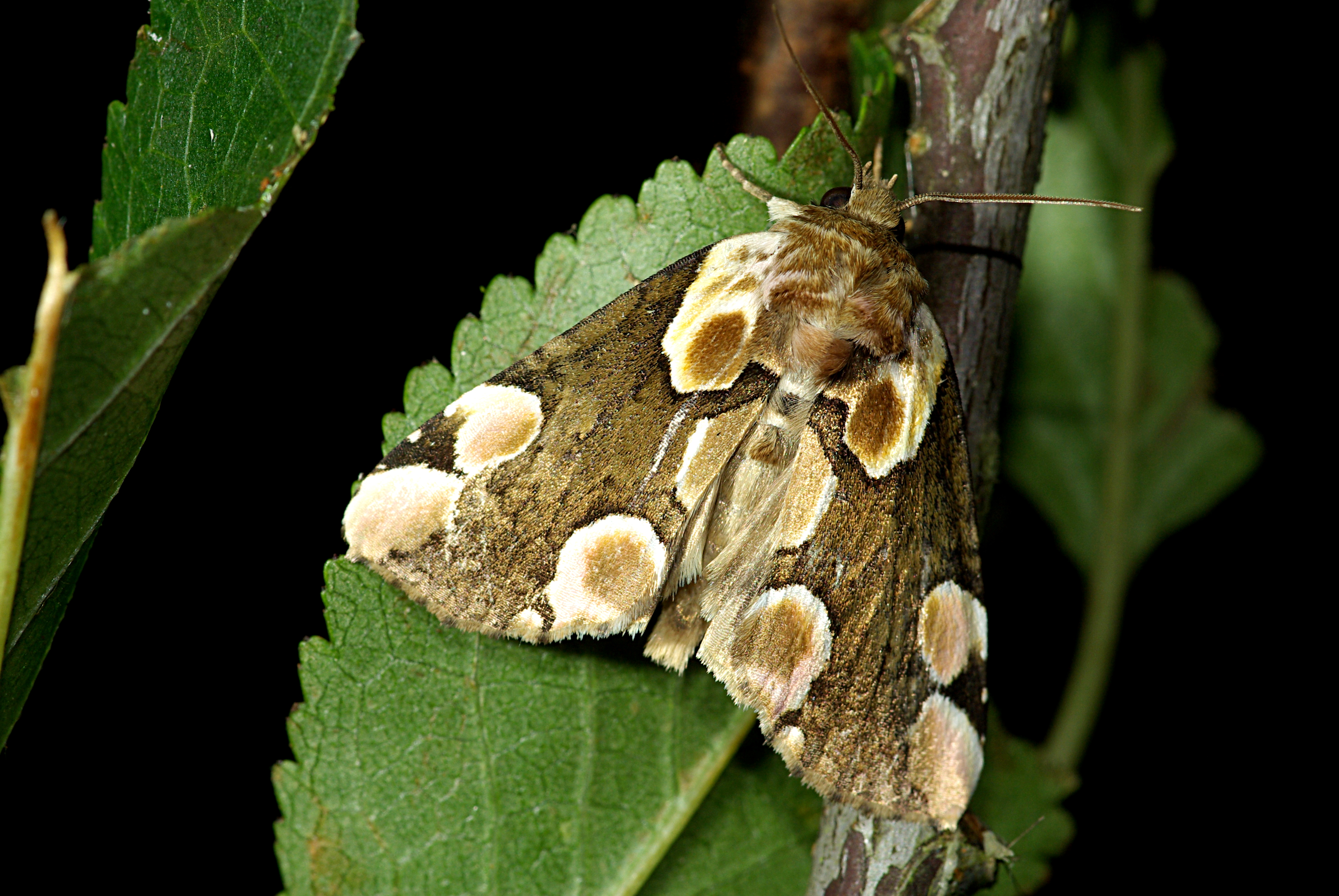

Scientific classification
- Kingdom: Animalia
- Phylum: Arthropoda
- Class: Insecta
- Order: Lepidoptera
- Family: Drepanidae
- Genus: Thyatira
- Species: T. batis

Binomial name
- Thyatira batis (Linnaeus, 1758)

Synonyms
- Phalaena (Noctua) batis Linnaeus, 1758; Thyatira batis japonica Werny, 1966; Thyatira batis mandschurica Werny, 1966; Thyatira rubrescens wilemani Werny, 1966; Thyatira batis japonica Dubatolov, 1991; Thyatira vicina pallida Rothschild, 1920; Thyatira rubrescens assamensis Werny, 1966; Thyatira rubrescens kwangtungensis Werny, 1966; Thyatira rubrescens nepalensis Werny, 1966; Thyatira rubrescens obscura Werny, 1966; Thyatira rubrescens orientalis Werny, 1966; Thyatira rubrescens szechwana Werny, 1966; Thyatira rubrescens tienmushana Werny, 1966; Thyatira rubrescens vietnamensis Werny, 1966; Thyatira batis mandschurica Werny, 1966

= Peach blossom =

Species of false owlet moth

The peach blossom (Thyatira batis) is a moth of the family Drepanidae. It was first described by Carl Linnaeus in his 1758 10th edition of Systema Naturae.

It is found throughout Europe and east through the Palearctic to Japan and Mongolia. It is a fairly common species in the British Isles.

It is a striking species with brown forewings marked with five pink and white blotches which do rather resemble the petals of peach blossom. The hindwings are buff and grey. The wingspan is 40–45 mm. The species flies at night, in western Europe in June and July sometimes with a partial second brood emerges in late August and September. The species is attracted to light and sugar.

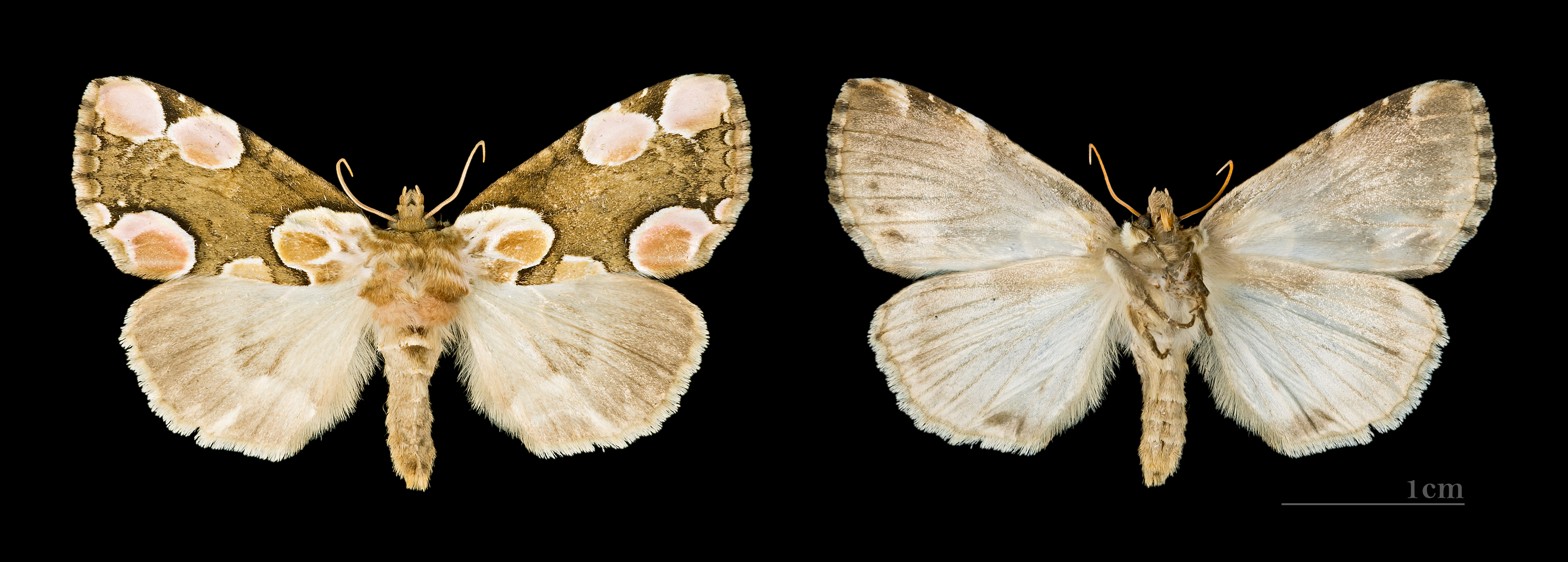
Both sides MHNT

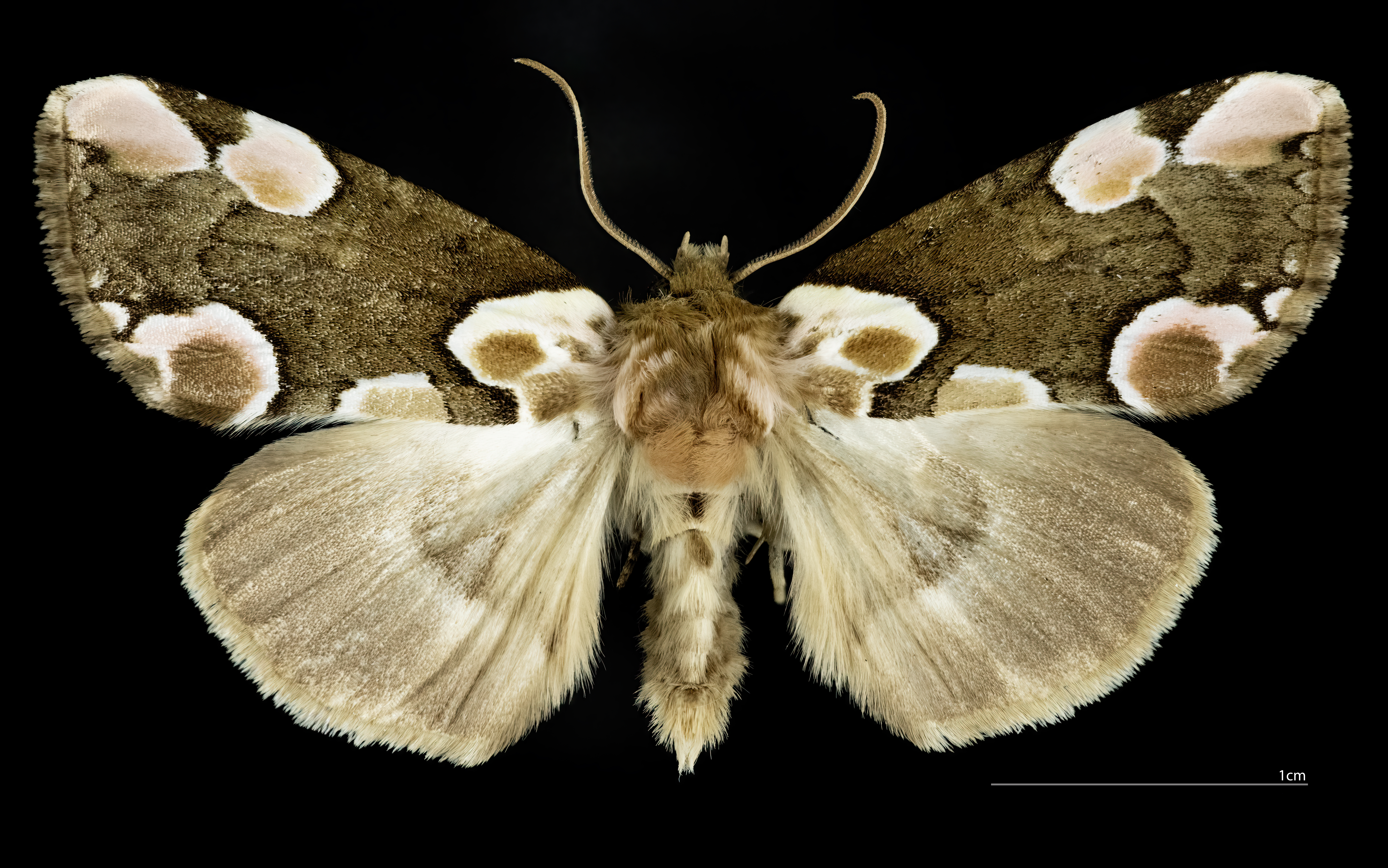
♂

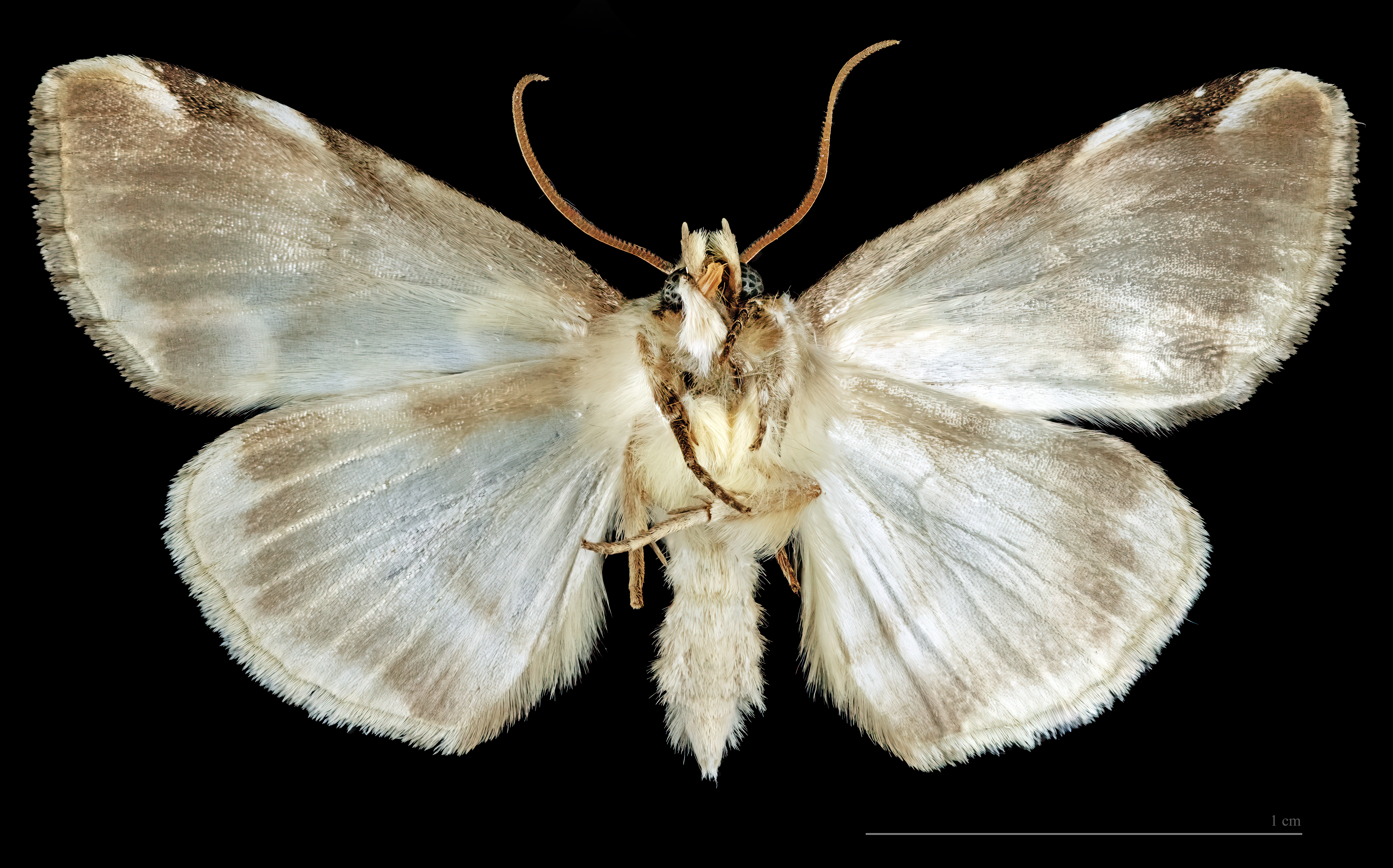
♂ △

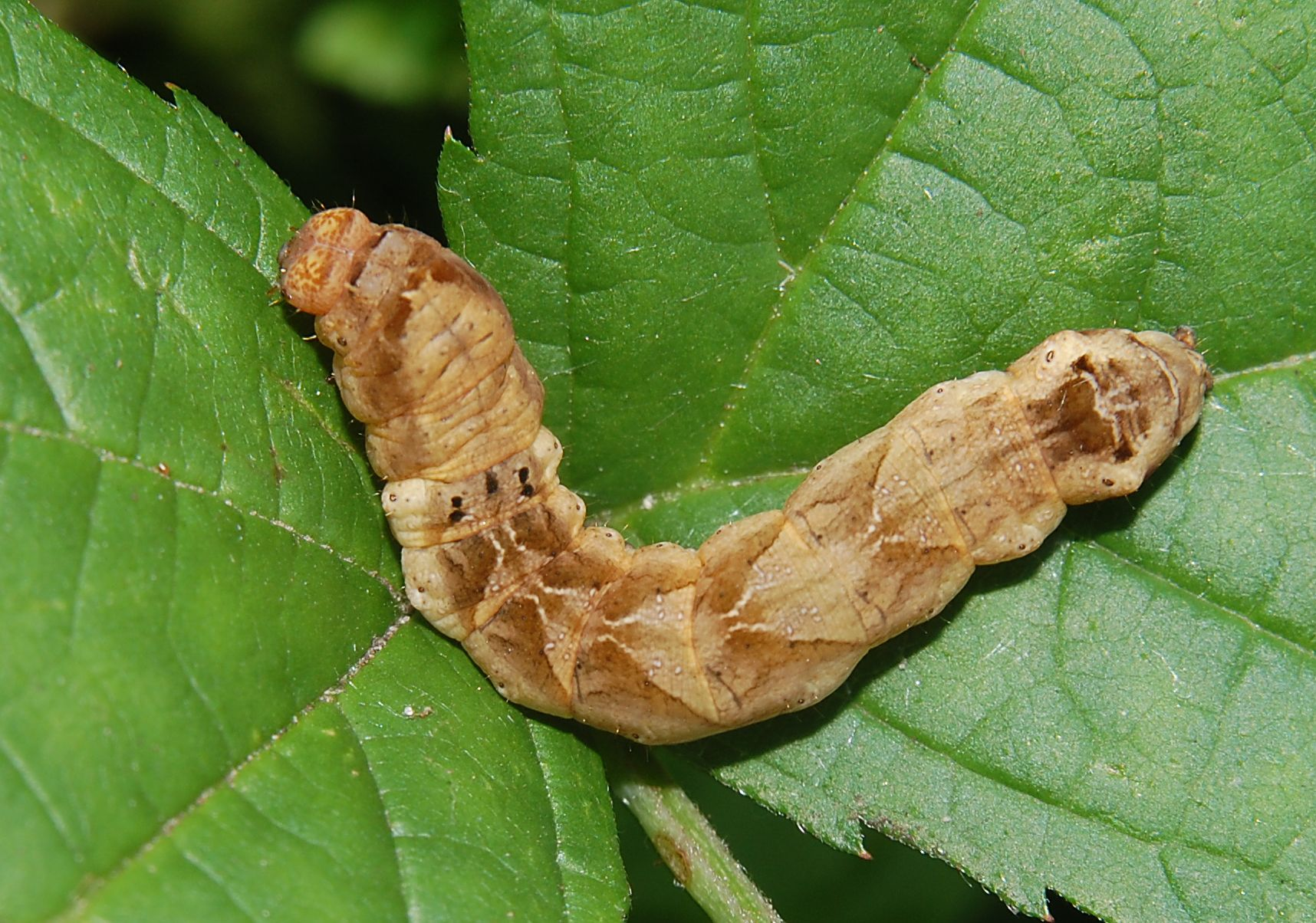
Caterpillar

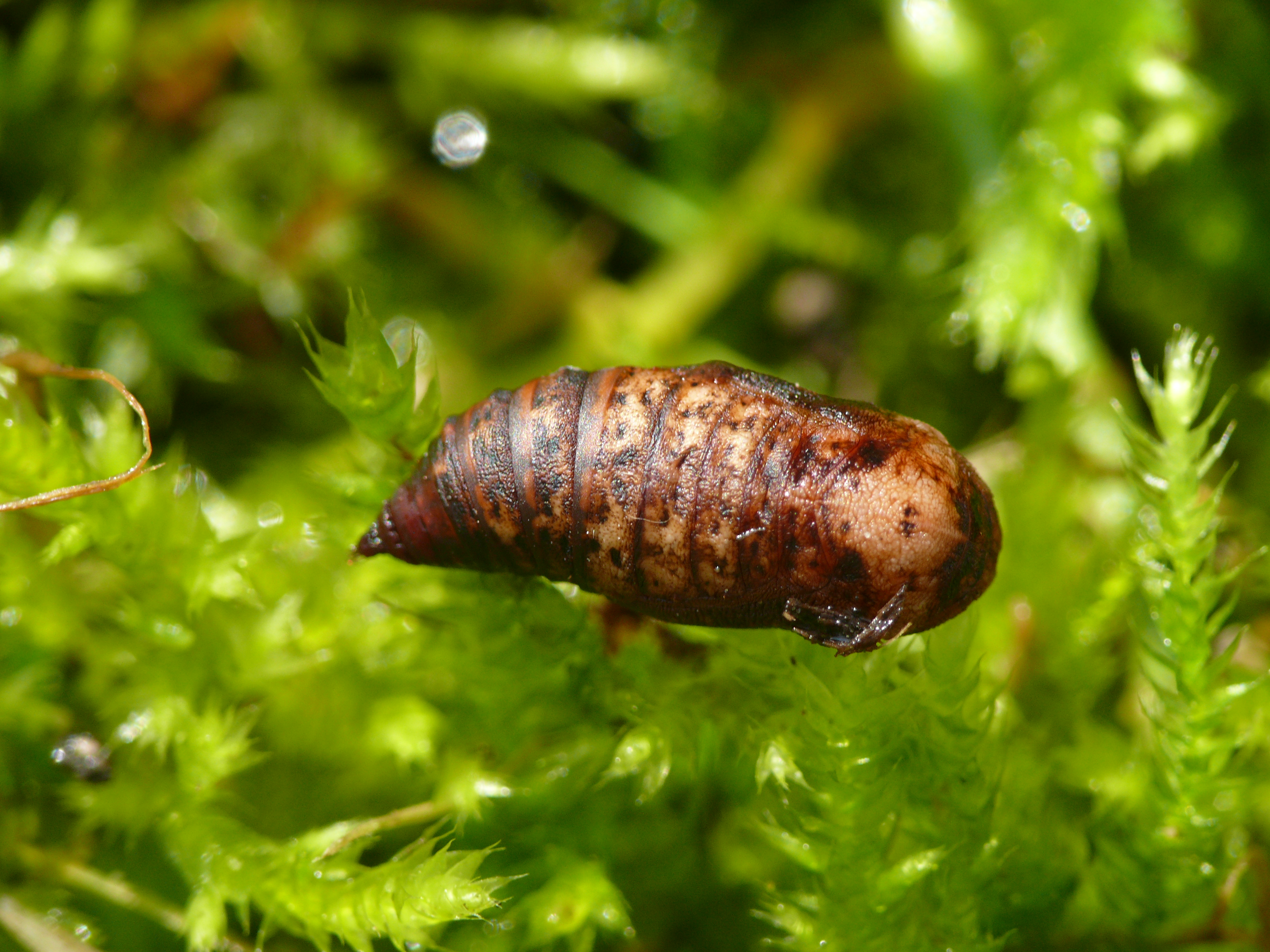
Pupa

The larva is brown with white markings and several humps along its back. At rest it raises both ends as with many drepanids. It feeds on various Rubus species. The species overwinters as a pupa.

1. The flight season refers to the British Isles. This may vary in other parts of the range.

== Subspecies ==
- Thyatira batis batis (Russia, Mongolia, Japan, Turkey, Iran, Caucasus, Algeria, Europe, China: Heilongjiang, Jilin, Inner Mongolia, Beijing, Hebei, Shaanxi, Gansu, Xinjiang)
- Thyatira batis formosicola Matsumura, 1933 (Taiwan)
- Thyatira batis pallida (Rothschild, 1920) (Sumatra)
- Thyatira batis rubrescens Werny, 1966 (India, Nepal, Vietnam, China: Henan, Shaanxi, Anhui, Zhejiang, Hubei, Jiangxi, Hunan, Fujian, Guangdong, Guangxi, Hainan, Sichuan, Guizhou, Yunnan, Tibet)
