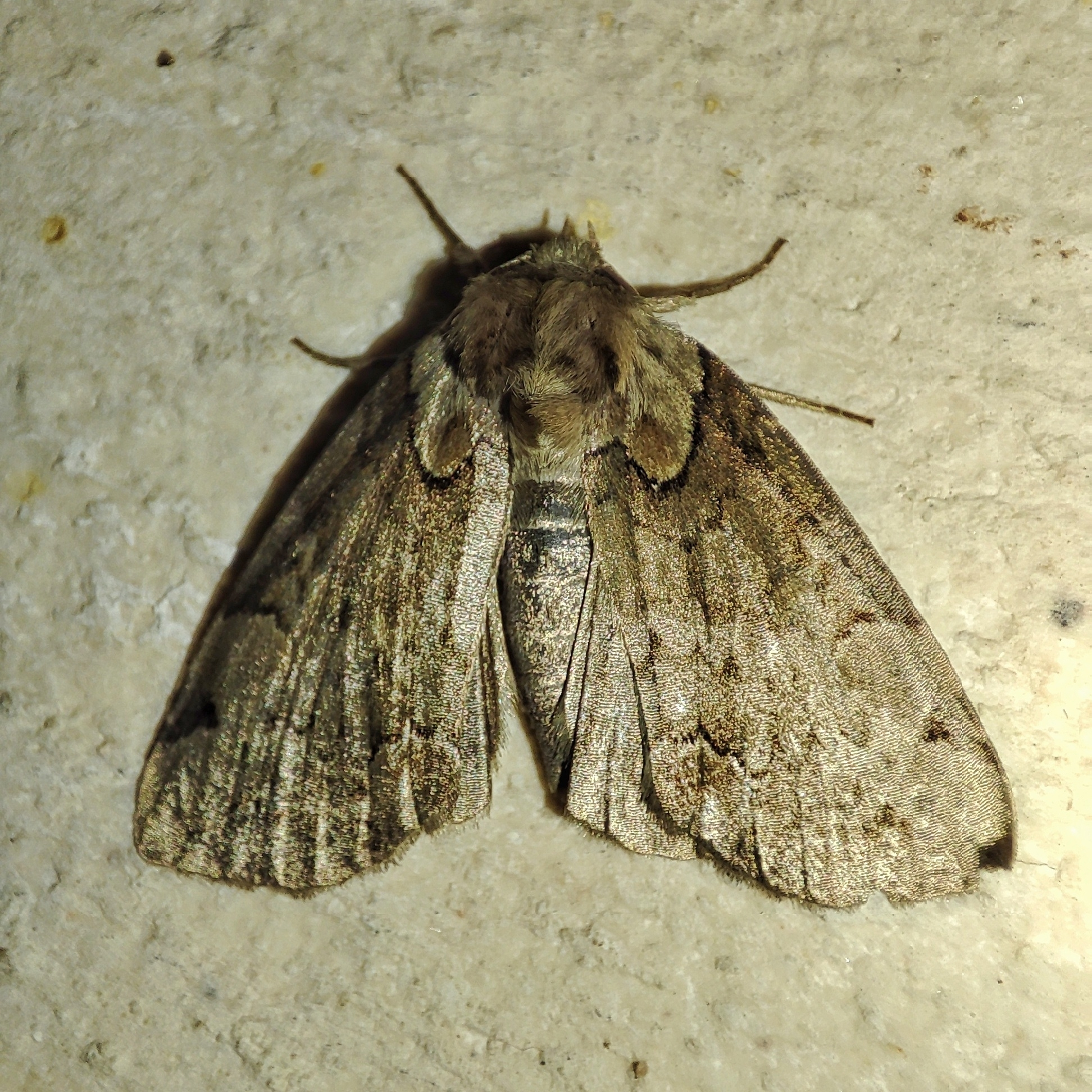

Scientific classification
- Domain: Eukaryota
- Kingdom: Animalia
- Phylum: Arthropoda
- Class: Insecta
- Order: Lepidoptera
- Family: Drepanidae
- Genus: Thyatira
- Species: T. hedemanni

Binomial name
- Thyatira hedemanni Christoph, 1885

Synonyms
- Thyatira hedemanni elbursina Werny, 1966

= Thyatira hedemanni =

Species of false owlet moth

Thyatira hedemanni is a moth in the family Drepanidae. It was described by Hugo Theodor Christoph in 1885. It is found in Georgia, Turkey, Armenia, Iran and Azerbaijan.
