= Thyatira vicina =

Scientific classification
- Kingdom: Animalia
- Phylum: Arthropoda
- Class: Insecta
- Order: Lepidoptera
- Family: Drepanidae
- Genus: Thyatira
- Species: T. vicina

Binomial name
- Thyatira vicina Guenée, 1852

Species of false owlet moth

Thyatira vicina is a moth in the family Drepanidae. It was described by Achille Guenée in 1852. It is found in Java and Bali in Indonesia.

== Subspecies ==
- Thyatira vicina vicina (Java)
- Thyatira vicina baliensis Werny, 1966 (Bali)
