= Horithyatira diehli =

Scientific classification
- Domain: Eukaryota
- Kingdom: Animalia
- Phylum: Arthropoda
- Class: Insecta
- Order: Lepidoptera
- Family: Drepanidae
- Genus: Horithyatira
- Species: H. diehli

Binomial name
- Horithyatira diehli Werny, 1966

Synonyms
- Horithyatira assamensis Werny, 1966

Species of false owlet moth

Horithyatira diehli is a moth in the family Drepanidae. It is found in Indonesia (Sumatra) and India (Assam).
