= Thyatira dysimata =

Scientific classification
- Domain: Eukaryota
- Kingdom: Animalia
- Phylum: Arthropoda
- Class: Insecta
- Order: Lepidoptera
- Family: Drepanidae
- Genus: Thyatira
- Species: T. dysimata

Binomial name
- Thyatira dysimata West, 1932

Species of false owlet moth

Thyatira dysimata is a moth in the family Drepanidae. It was described by West in 1932. It is found in the Philippines (Luzon).
