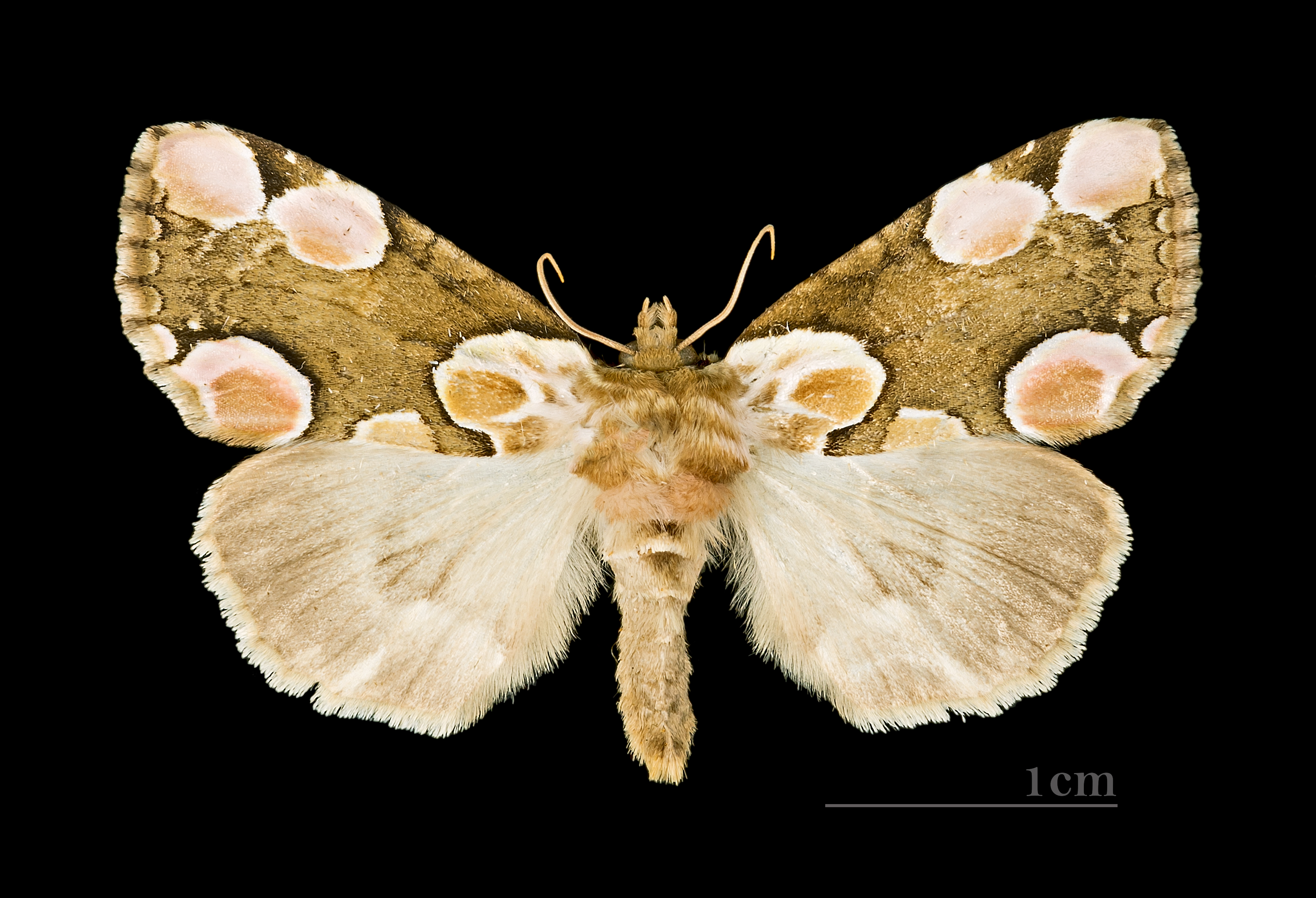
- Thyatira batis

Scientific classification
- Domain: Eukaryota
- Kingdom: Animalia
- Phylum: Arthropoda
- Class: Insecta
- Order: Lepidoptera
- Family: Drepanidae
- Subfamily: Drepaninae
- Genus: Thyatira; Ochsenheimer, 1816

Synonyms
- Strophia Meigen, 1832; Calleida Sodoffsky, 1837; Callida Agassiz, 1847

= Thyatira (moth) =

Moth genus in family Drepanidae

Thyatira is a genus of moths belonging to the subfamily Thyatirinae of the Drepanidae. It was erected by Ferdinand Ochsenheimer in 1816.

== Species ==
- Thyatira batis (Linnaeus, 1758)
- Thyatira bodemeyeri Bang-Haas, 1934
- Thyatira brasiliensis Werny, 1966
- Thyatira casta Felder, 1874
- Thyatira cognata Warren, 1888
- Thyatira delattini (Werny, 1966)
- Thyatira dysimata West, 1932
- Thyatira florina (Gaede, 1930)
- Thyatira hedemanni (Christoph, 1885)
- Thyatira mexicana Edwards, 1884
- Thyatira philippina Laszlo, G. Ronkay, L. Ronkay & Witt, 2007
- Thyatira staphyla Dognin, 1890
- Thyatira tama Schaus, 1933
- Thyatira vicina Guenée, 1852

== Former species ==
- Thyatira rubrescens Werny, 1966
