= Thyatira cognata =

Scientific classification
- Domain: Eukaryota
- Kingdom: Animalia
- Phylum: Arthropoda
- Class: Insecta
- Order: Lepidoptera
- Family: Drepanidae
- Genus: Thyatira
- Species: T. cognata

Binomial name
- Thyatira cognata Warren, 1888

Synonyms
- Thyatira cognata Moore, 1888

Species of false owlet moth

Thyatira cognata is a moth in the family Drepanidae. It was described by Warren in 1888. It is found in India (Himachal Pradesh).
