= Thyatira staphyla =

Scientific classification
- Domain: Eukaryota
- Kingdom: Animalia
- Phylum: Arthropoda
- Class: Insecta
- Order: Lepidoptera
- Family: Drepanidae
- Genus: Thyatira
- Species: T. staphyla

Binomial name
- Thyatira staphyla Dognin, 1890

Species of false owlet moth

Thyatira staphyla is a moth in the family Drepanidae. It was described by Paul Dognin in 1890. It is found in Loja Province, Ecuador.
