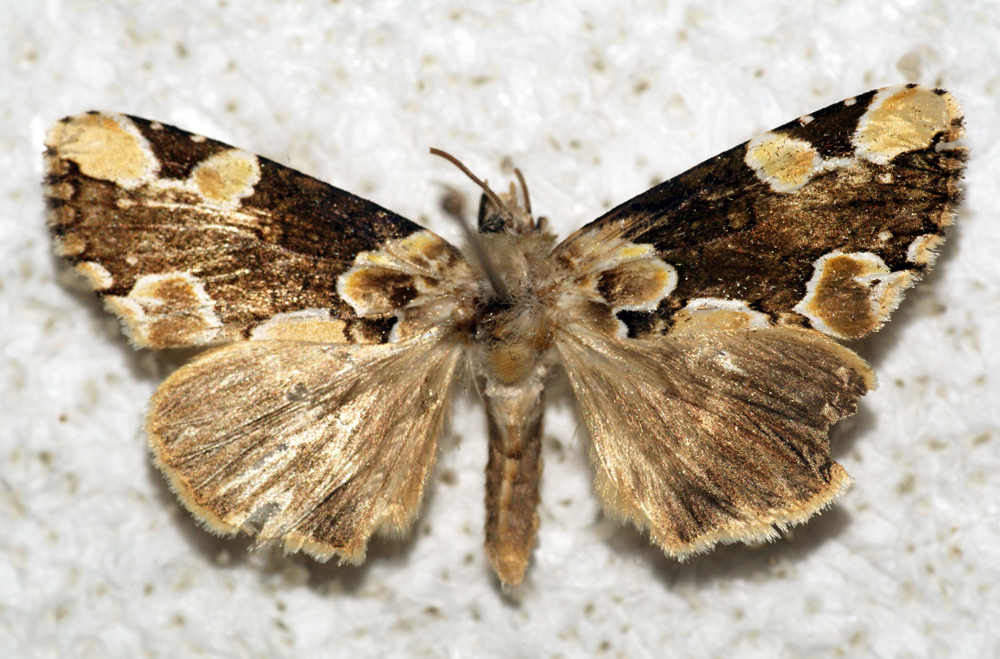

Scientific classification
- Domain: Eukaryota
- Kingdom: Animalia
- Phylum: Arthropoda
- Class: Insecta
- Order: Lepidoptera
- Family: Drepanidae
- Genus: Thyatira
- Species: T. mexicana

Binomial name
- Thyatira mexicana H. Edwards, 1884

Synonyms
- Thyatira batis var. mexicana H. Edwards, 1884; Thyatira superba Barnes, 1901; Thyatira mexicana costaricana Werny, 1966; Thyatira mexicana flavimacula Werny, 1966

= Thyatira mexicana =

Species of false owlet moth

Thyatira mexicana is a moth in the family Drepanidae. It was described by Henry Edwards in 1884. It is found in the US state of Arizona through Central America (Mexico, Costa Rica, Panama) to South America (Bolivia, Peru).

The wingspan is about 35 mm.
