= Thyatira florina =

Scientific classification
- Domain: Eukaryota
- Kingdom: Animalia
- Phylum: Arthropoda
- Class: Insecta
- Order: Lepidoptera
- Family: Drepanidae
- Genus: Thyatira
- Species: T. florina

Binomial name
- Thyatira florina (Gaede, 1930)

Synonyms
- Gaurena florina Gaede, 1930

Species of false owlet moth

Thyatira florina is a moth in the family Drepanidae. It was described by Max Gaede in 1930. It is found on Sulawesi and Buru.
