= Thyatira philippina =

Scientific classification
- Kingdom: Animalia
- Phylum: Arthropoda
- Clade: Pancrustacea
- Class: Insecta
- Order: Lepidoptera
- Family: Drepanidae
- Genus: Thyatira
- Species: T. philippina

Binomial name
- Thyatira philippina László, G. Ronkay, L. Ronkay & Witt, 2007

Species of false owlet moth

Thyatira philippina is a moth in the family Drepanidae. It was described by Gyula M. László, Gábor Ronkay, László Aladár Ronkay and Thomas Joseph Witt in 2007. It is found on Mindanao in the Philippines.
