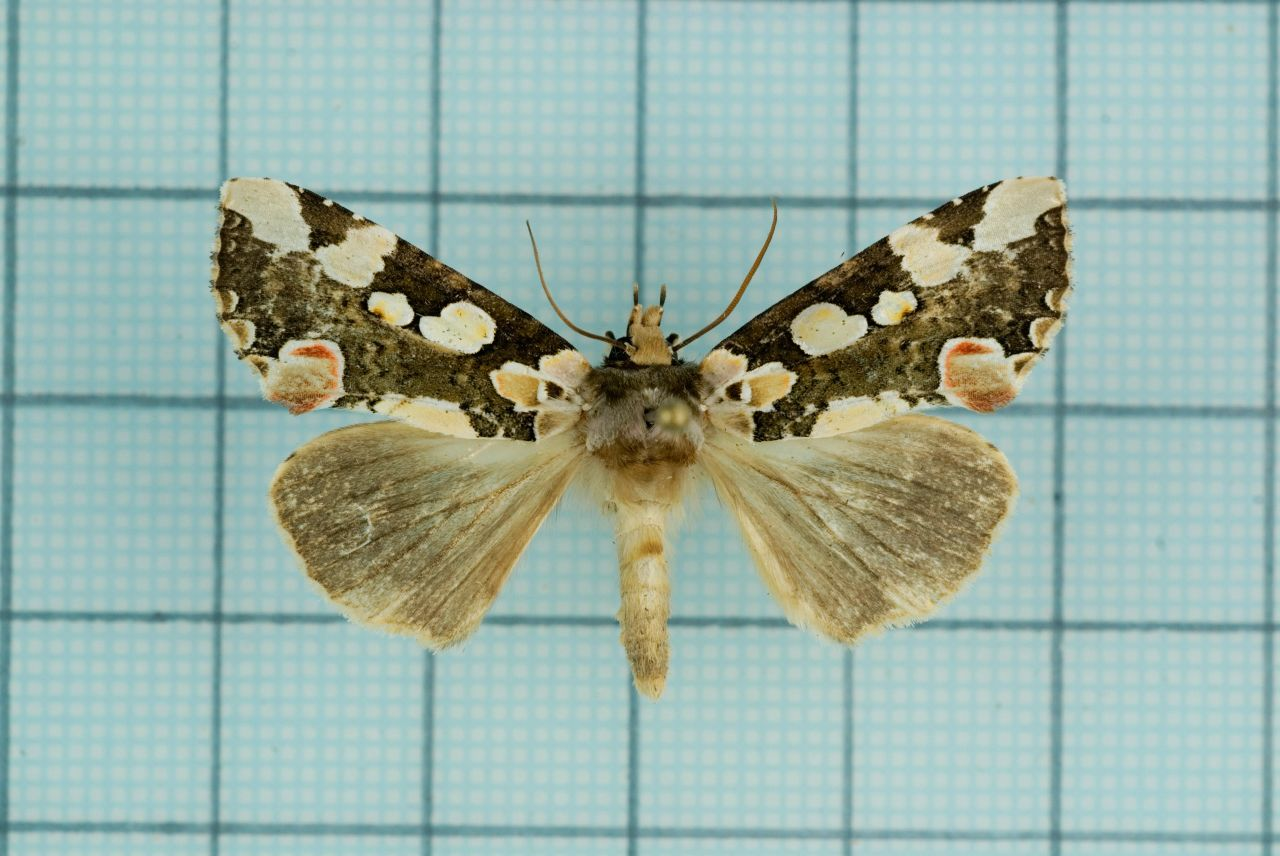

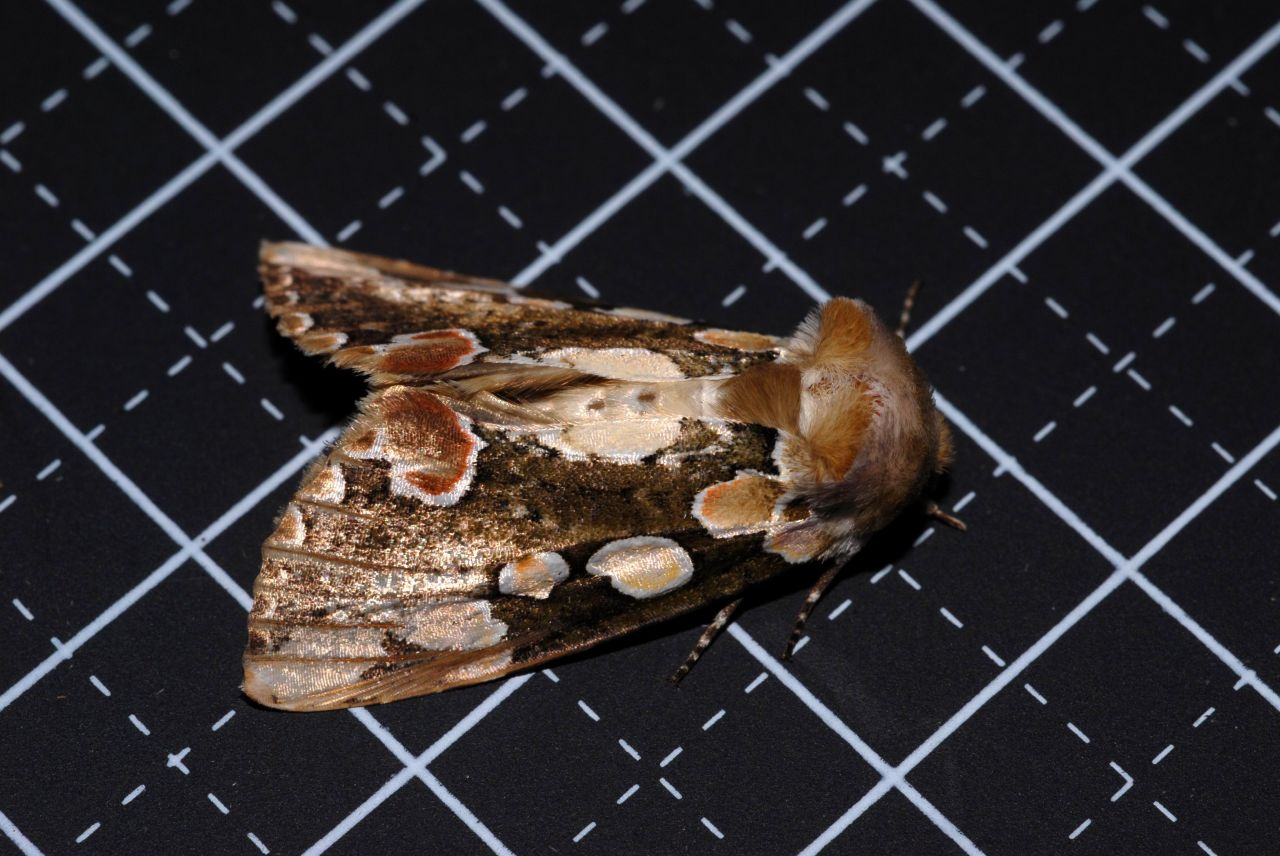

Scientific classification
- Domain: Eukaryota
- Kingdom: Animalia
- Phylum: Arthropoda
- Class: Insecta
- Order: Lepidoptera
- Family: Drepanidae
- Genus: Horithyatira
- Species: H. decorata

Binomial name
- Horithyatira decorata (Moore, 1881)

Synonyms
- Thyatira decorata Moore, 1881; Thyatira decorata birmanica Bryk, 1944; Gaurena ornata Roepke, 1944; Horithyatira decorata thodungensis Werny, 1966; Horithyatira assamensis diehli Werny, 1966; Horithyatira assamensis hoenei Werny, 1966; Thyatira kawamurae Matsumura, 1921; Thyatira takamukui Matsumura, 1921

= Horithyatira decorata =

Species of false owlet moth

Horithyatira decorata is a moth in the family Drepanidae. It is found from the north-eastern Himalaya and Nepal to southern China and Taiwan.

== Subspecies ==
- Horithyatira decorata decorata (Nepal, Bhutan, Myanmar, India, Vietnam, China: Shaanxi, Hubei, Hainan, Guangdong, Guangxi, Sichuan, Guizhou, Yunnan, Tibet)
- Horithyatira decorata kawamurae (Matsumura, 1921) (Japan)
- Horithyatira decorata takamukui (Matsumura, 1921) (Taiwan)
