= Thyatira bodemeyeri =

Scientific classification
- Domain: Eukaryota
- Kingdom: Animalia
- Phylum: Arthropoda
- Class: Insecta
- Order: Lepidoptera
- Family: Drepanidae
- Genus: Thyatira
- Species: T. bodemeyeri

Binomial name
- Thyatira bodemeyeri O. Bang-Haas, 1934

Species of false owlet moth

Thyatira bodemeyeri is a moth in the family Drepanidae. It was described by Otto Bang-Haas in 1934. It was described from Persia. It has golden and tan wings with a furry looking body and multiple light yellow dots on the wings.
