= Thyatira casta =

Scientific classification
- Domain: Eukaryota
- Kingdom: Animalia
- Phylum: Arthropoda
- Class: Insecta
- Order: Lepidoptera
- Family: Drepanidae
- Genus: Thyatira
- Species: T. casta

Binomial name
- Thyatira casta Felder, 1874

Species of false owlet moth

Thyatira casta is a moth in the family Drepanidae. It was described by Felder in 1874. It is found in Colombia.
