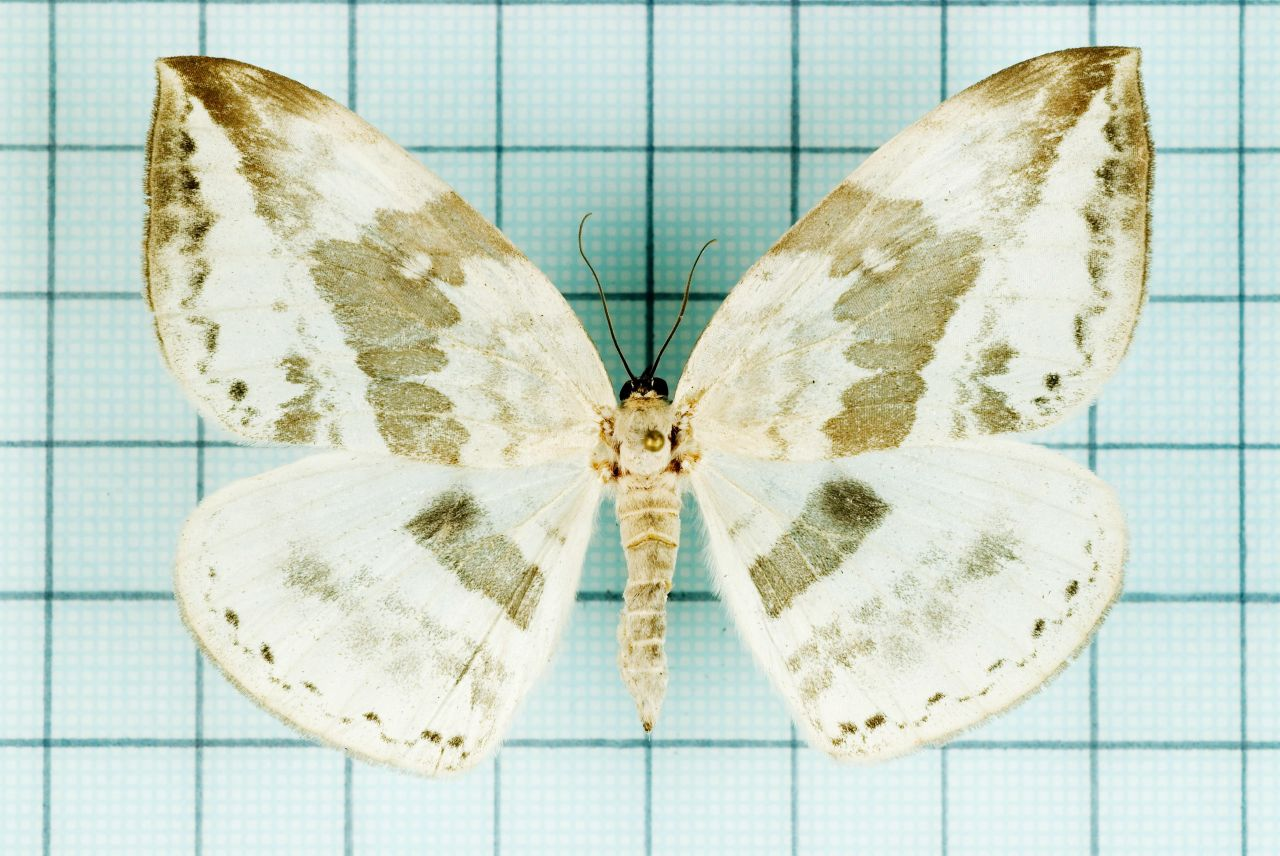
- Cyclidia substigmaria

Scientific classification
- Kingdom: Animalia
- Phylum: Arthropoda
- Clade: Pancrustacea
- Class: Insecta
- Order: Lepidoptera
- Family: Drepanidae
- Subfamily: Cyclidiinae
- Genus: Cyclidia; Guenée, 1857

Synonyms
- Haloplia Snellen, 1892; Nelcynda Walker, 1862

= Cyclidia =

Moth genus in family Drepanidae

Cyclidia is a genus of moths belonging to the subfamily of Cyclidiinae. The genus was erected by Achille Guenée in 1857. Cyclidia is one of two genera in the subfamily of Cyclidiinae, the other being Mimozethes. The two genera differ in their genitalia, the male genitalia of the cyclidia is more developed and the female genitalia contains sclerotization, where Mimozethes does not.

Cyclidia reside in Southeast Asia, specifically in China, India, Indonesia, Japan, Korean Peninsula, Laos, Mayanma, Nepal, Peninsular Malaysia, Thailand, and Vietnam.

== Species ==
- Cyclidia dictyaria Swinhoe, 1899
- Cyclidia diehli Lutz & Kobes, 2002
- Cyclidia fabiolaria Oberthür, 1884
- Cyclidia fractifasciata Leech, 1898
- Cyclidia javana Aurivillius, 1894
- Cyclidia orciferaria Walker, 1860
- Cyclidia pitmani Moore, 1886
- Cyclidia rectificata Walker, 1862
- Cyclidia sericea Warren, 1922
- Cyclidia substigmaria Hübner, 1825

== Status unknown ==
- Cyclidia fuscifusa Seitz, 1934

== Former species ==
- Cyclidia tetraspota Chu & Wang, 1987
