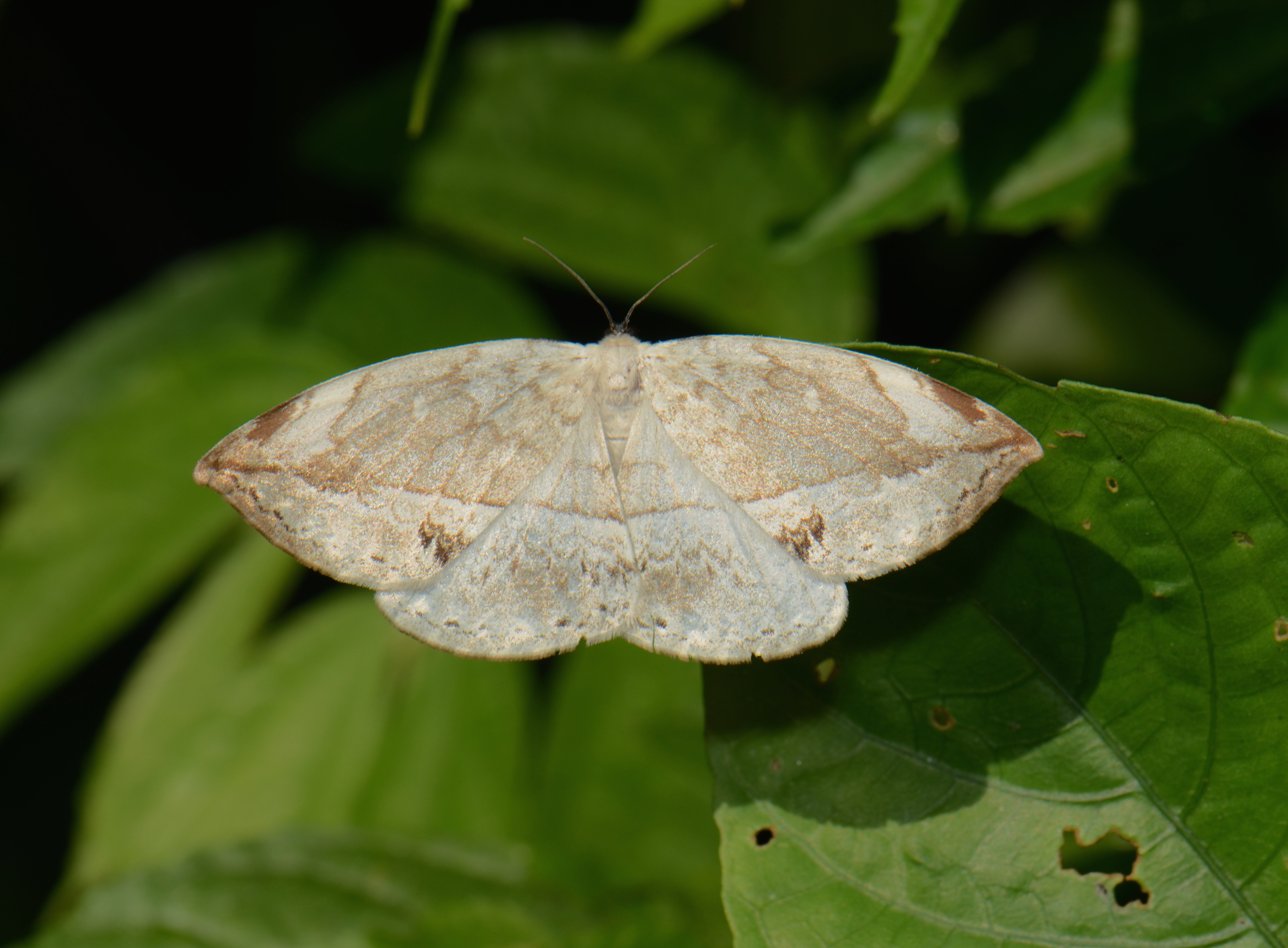

Scientific classification
- Domain: Eukaryota
- Kingdom: Animalia
- Phylum: Arthropoda
- Class: Insecta
- Order: Lepidoptera
- Family: Drepanidae
- Genus: Cyclidia
- Species: C. javana

Binomial name
- Cyclidia javana Aurivillius, 1894

Synonyms
- Euchera absentimacula Warren, 1896

= Cyclidia javana =

Species of hook-tip moth

Cyclidia javana is a moth in the family Drepanidae. It was described by Per Olof Christopher Aurivillius in 1894. It is found on Java and Borneo. The habitat consists of lowland forests.

The ground colour of the wings is white with diffuse brownish-grey markings.
