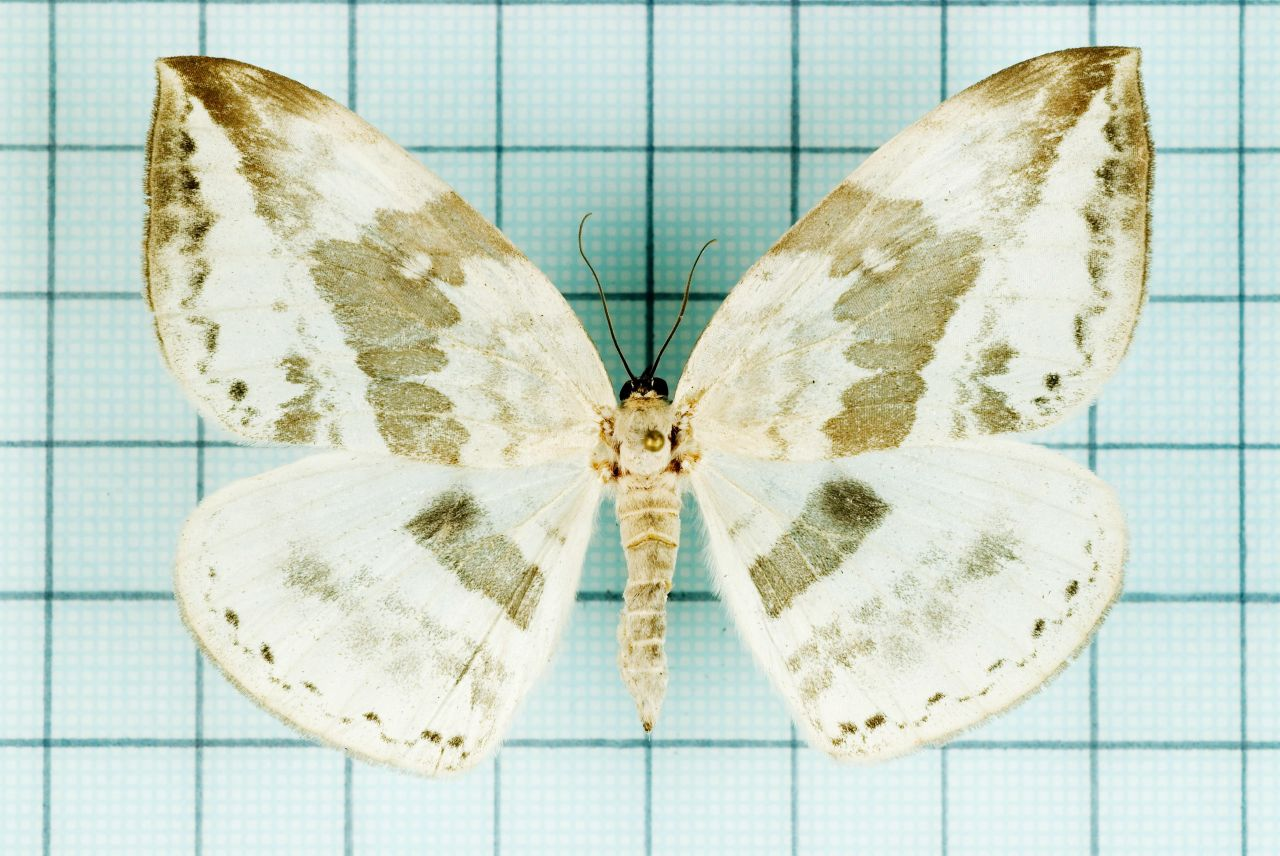
- Cyclidia substigmaria

Scientific classification
- Domain: Eukaryota
- Kingdom: Animalia
- Phylum: Arthropoda
- Class: Insecta
- Order: Lepidoptera
- Family: Drepanidae
- Subfamily: Cyclidiinae; Warren, 1922

Genera
- Cyclidia; Mimozethes

= Cyclidiinae =

Subfamily of hook-tip moths

Cyclidiinae is a small subfamily of the Drepanidae moths. They occur in Southeast Asia. Their caterpillars feed on Alangium (Alangiaceae). In some treatments, they are raised to full family status.

== Genera ==
- Cyclidia
- Mimozethes
