= Cyclidia diehli =

Scientific classification
- Domain: Eukaryota
- Kingdom: Animalia
- Phylum: Arthropoda
- Class: Insecta
- Order: Lepidoptera
- Family: Drepanidae
- Genus: Cyclidia
- Species: C. diehli

Binomial name
- Cyclidia diehli Kobes, 2002

Species of hook-tip moth

Cyclidia diehli is a moth in the family Drepanidae. It was described by Lutz W. R. Kobes in 2002. It is found on Sumatra.
