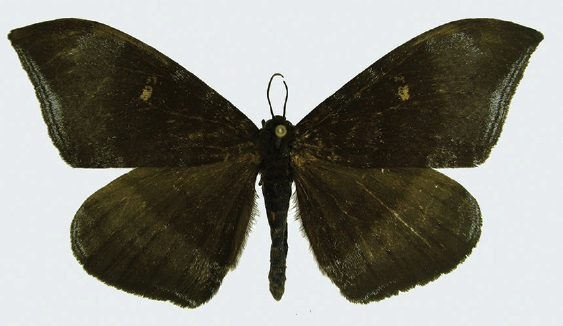

Scientific classification
- Kingdom: Animalia
- Phylum: Arthropoda
- Class: Insecta
- Order: Lepidoptera
- Family: Drepanidae
- Genus: Cyclidia
- Species: C. orciferaria

Binomial name
- Cyclidia orciferaria Walker, 1860

Synonyms
- Cyclidia ociferaria Kirby, 1892

= Cyclidia orciferaria =

Species of hook-tip moth

Cyclidia orciferaria is a moth in the family Drepanidae. It was described by Francis Walker in 1860. It is found in China (Jiangsu, Zhejiang, Jiangxi, Hunan, Fujian, Guangdong, Hainan, Guangxi, Sichuan, Yunnan), Thailand, Vietnam, Indonesia and Myanmar.

This species is different from other congeners in the following external characters: the apex of the forewing is falcate (sickle shaped); the wing colour is blackish brown; two bands covered with greyish-blue scales are present on the forewing, and the inner band is narrower and less distinct than the outer band; the discal spot of the forewing is yellowish brown, oblong, with a blackish brown narrow line medially; greyish-blue scales are covered on the submarginal lines of both wings, and often absent on the middle part of the hindwing.

== Subspecies ==
- Cyclidia orciferaria orciferaria (China)
- Cyclidia orciferaria diffusa Bryk, 1943 (Burma)
