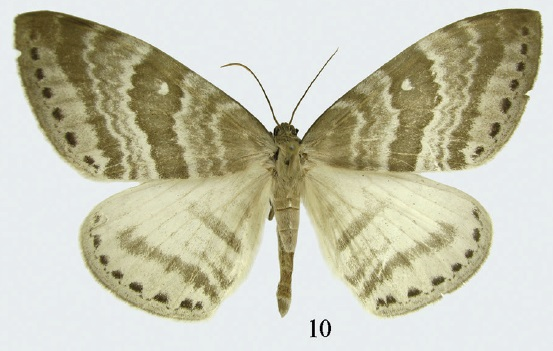

Scientific classification
- Kingdom: Animalia
- Phylum: Arthropoda
- Class: Insecta
- Order: Lepidoptera
- Family: Drepanidae
- Genus: Cyclidia
- Species: C. rectificata

Binomial name
- Cyclidia rectificata (Walker, 1862)

Synonyms
- Nelcynda rectificata Walker, 1862; Cyclidia rectificata f. divisa Bryk, 1943; Cyclidia mauricolaria Walker, 1862; Cyclidia patulata Walker, 1866

= Cyclidia rectificata =

Species of hook-tip moth

Cyclidia rectificata is a moth in the family Drepanidae. It was described by Francis Walker in 1862. It is found in India and Myanmar.

Adults are a very pale fawn colour, the wings with submarginal blackish spots. These are paler and smaller on the underside, where the four wings are nearly alike in colour and in markings. The forewings have a white discal spot, and with four oblique slightly undulating and denticulated white lines. The space about the lines is rather darker than the wings elsewhere. The hindwings are whitish, with incomplete fawn-coloured bands, which correspond to the spaces between the lines of the forewings.

== Subspecies ==
- Cyclidia rectificata rectificata (India, China)
- Cyclidia rectificata malaisei Bryk, 1943 (Burma)
