= Cyclidia fabiolaria =

Scientific classification
- Domain: Eukaryota
- Kingdom: Animalia
- Phylum: Arthropoda
- Class: Insecta
- Order: Lepidoptera
- Family: Drepanidae
- Genus: Cyclidia
- Species: C. fabiolaria

Binomial name
- Cyclidia fabiolaria (Oberthür, 1884)

Synonyms
- Euchera fabiolaria Oberthür, 1884

Species of hook-tip moth

Cyclidia fabiolaria is a moth in the family Drepanidae. It was described by Oberthür in 1884. It is found in China (Tibet).
