= Mimozethes argentilinearia =

Scientific classification
- Domain: Eukaryota
- Kingdom: Animalia
- Phylum: Arthropoda
- Class: Insecta
- Order: Lepidoptera
- Family: Drepanidae
- Genus: Mimozethes
- Species: M. argentilinearia

Binomial name
- Mimozethes argentilinearia (Leech, 1897)

Synonyms
- Decetia argentilinearia Leech, 1897; Euchera nana Warren, 1897; Mimozethes nana

Species of hook-tip moth

Mimozethes argentilinearia is a moth in the family Drepanidae. It was described by John Henry Leech in 1897. It is found in Japan.

The wingspan is about 33 mm. Adults are olivaceous brown, the forewings with an oblique silvery-grey line, angulated below the costa and slightly elbowed inwards above the inner margin. Between this line and the base of the wing there are two or three finer wavy and angulated lines. The outer marginal area is golden brown, with an upright brown bar on the inner margin. The hindwings have two silvery-grey transverse lines on the central area and three wavy diffuse lines of the same colour on the outer marginal area.

The larvae feed on Alangium species.
