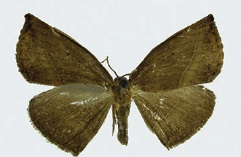

Scientific classification
- Domain: Eukaryota
- Kingdom: Animalia
- Phylum: Arthropoda
- Class: Insecta
- Order: Lepidoptera
- Family: Drepanidae
- Genus: Mimozethes
- Species: M. angula

Binomial name
- Mimozethes angula Chu & Wang, 1987

= Mimozethes angula =

Species of hook-tip moth

Mimozethes angula is a moth in the family Drepanidae. It was described by Hong-Fu Chu and Lin-Yao Wang in 1987. It is found in China (Sichuan, Henan, Hubei).
