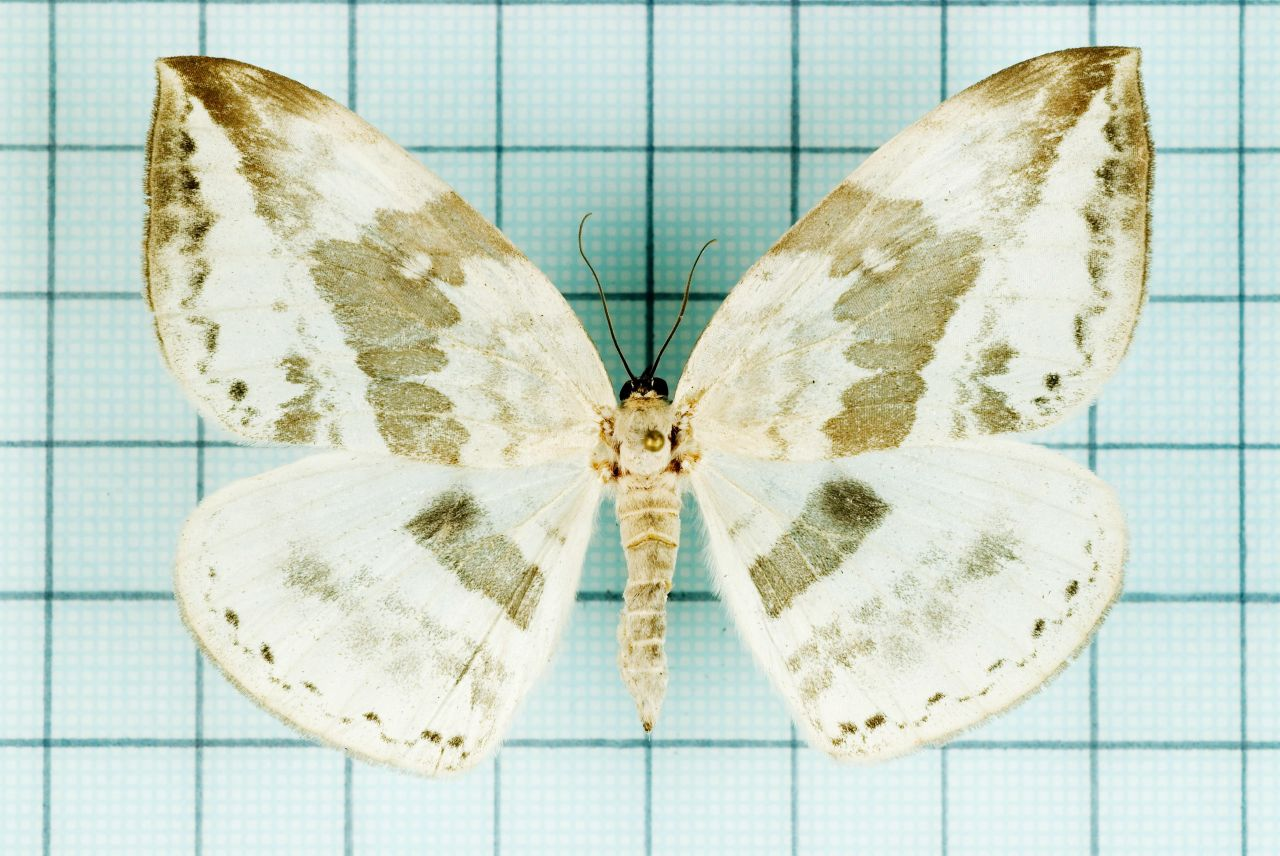

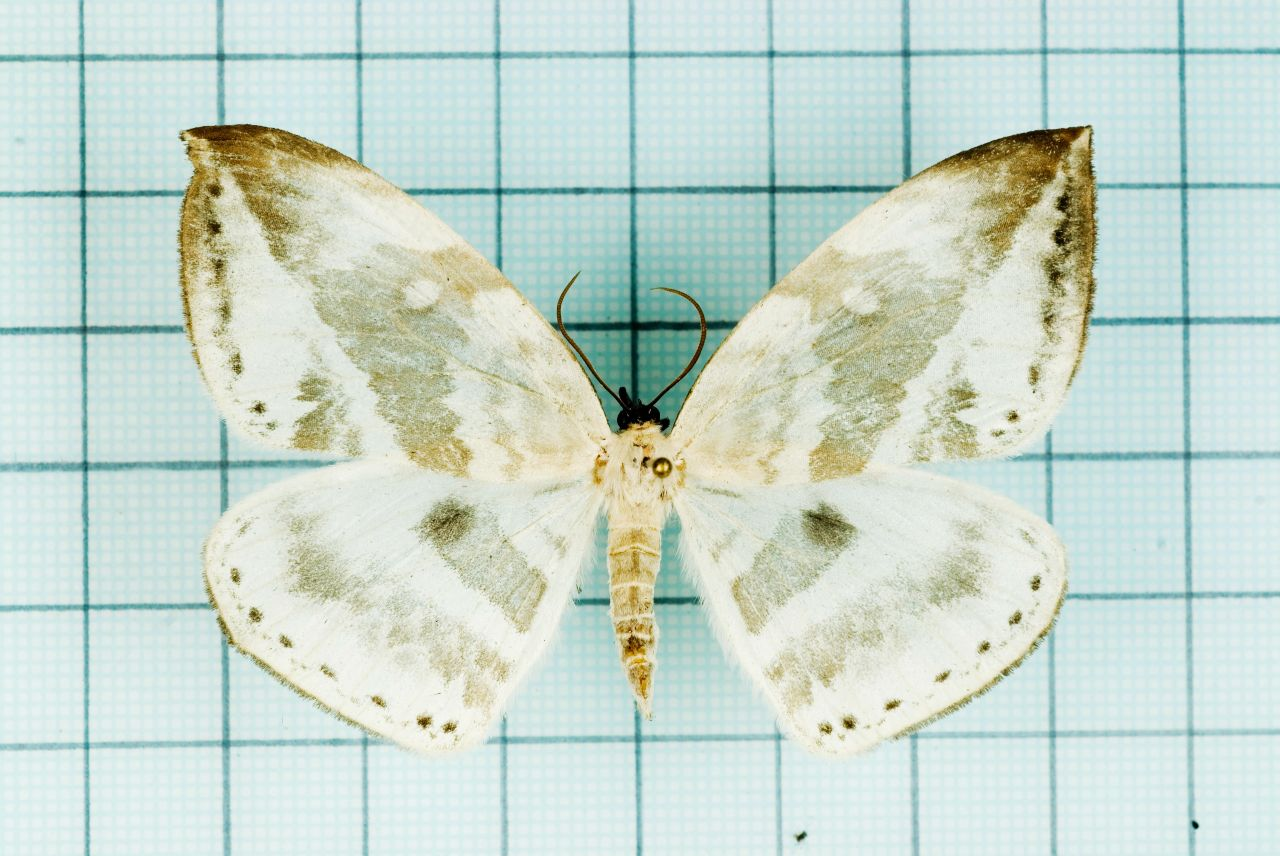

Scientific classification
- Kingdom: Animalia
- Phylum: Arthropoda
- Clade: Pancrustacea
- Class: Insecta
- Order: Lepidoptera
- Family: Drepanidae
- Genus: Cyclidia
- Species: C. substigmaria

Binomial name
- Cyclidia substigmaria (Hübner, 1831)

Synonyms
- Euchera substigmaria Hübner, [1831]; Abraxes capitata Walker, 1862; Cyclidia substigmaria brunna Chu & Wang, 1987; Cyclidia tetraspota Chu & Wang, 1987

= Cyclidia substigmaria =

Species of hook-tip moth

Cyclidia substigmaria is a species of moth in the family Drepanidae described by Jacob Hübner in 1831. It is found in Taiwan, China, India and Japan.

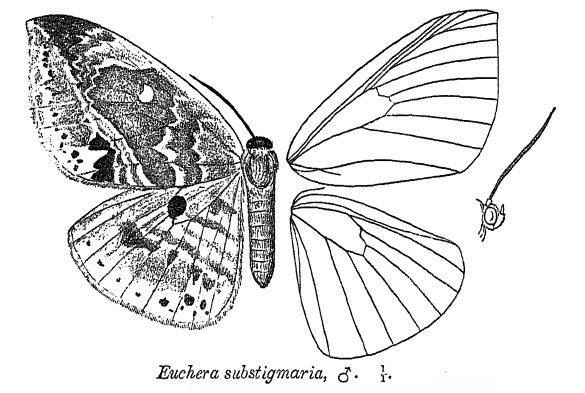
Illustration

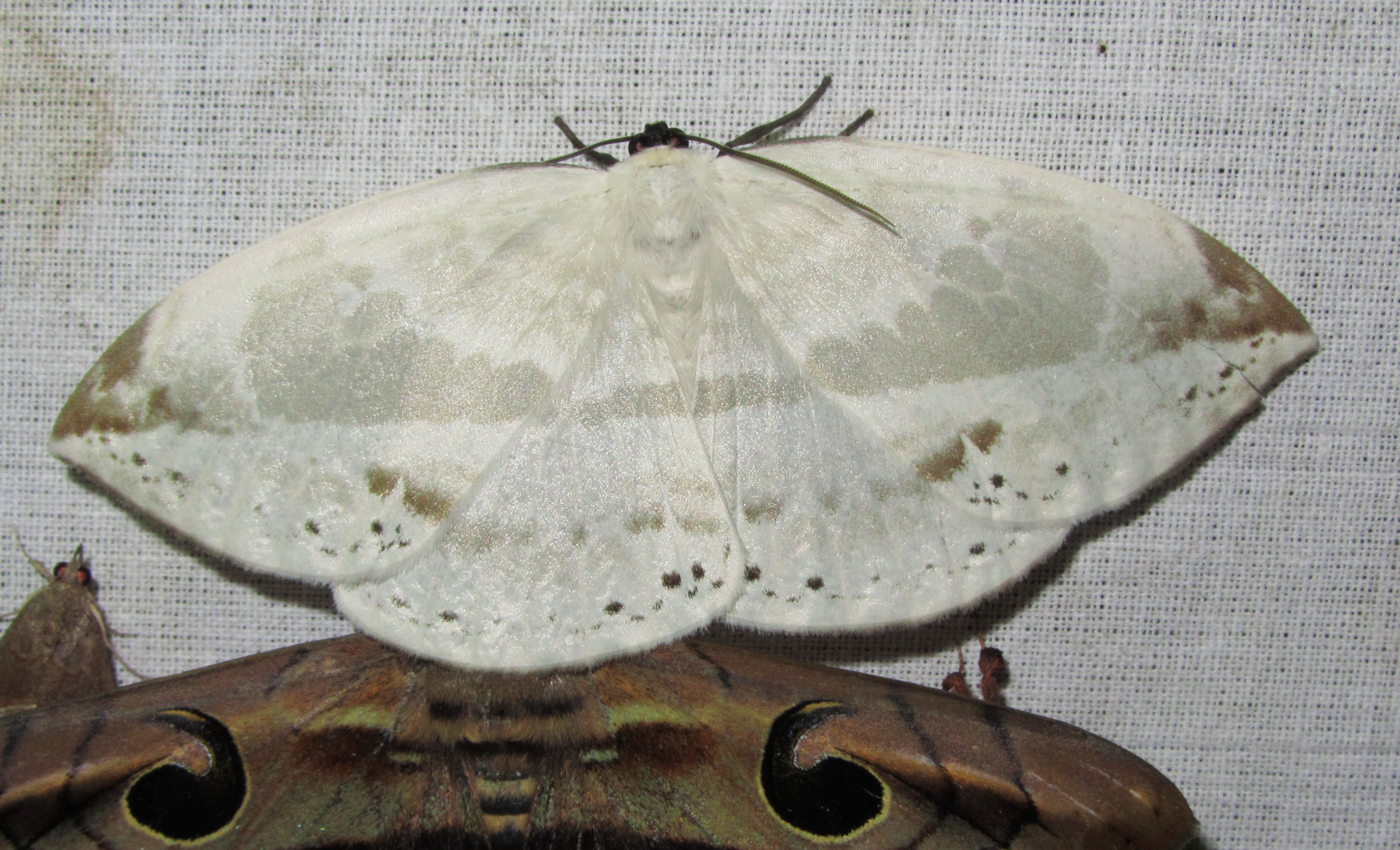

The wingspan is 55–65 mm.

The larvae are gregarious and specialist herbivores on Alangium species.

== Subspecies ==
- Cyclidia substigmaria substigmaria (Taiwan, China and Vietnam)
- Cyclidia substigmaria intermedia Prout, 1918 (Tibet)
- Cyclidia substigmaria modesta Bryk, 1943 (Myanmar)
- Cyclidia substigmaria nigralbata Warren, 1914 (Japan, Korean Peninsula)
- Cyclidia substigmaria superstigmaria Prout, 1918 (India, Nepal)
