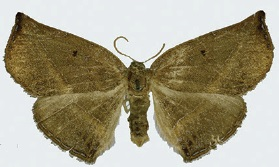

Scientific classification
- Kingdom: Animalia
- Phylum: Arthropoda
- Class: Insecta
- Order: Lepidoptera
- Family: Drepanidae
- Genus: Mimozethes
- Species: M. lilacinaria

Binomial name
- Mimozethes lilacinaria (Leech, 1897)

Synonyms
- Decetia lilacinaria Leech, 1897; Heteromiza lycoraearia Oberthür, 1912

= Mimozethes lilacinaria =

Species of hook-tip moth

Mimozethes lilacinaria is a moth in the family Drepanidae. It was described by John Henry Leech in 1897. It is found in the western Chinese provinces of Sichuan and Yunnan.

The wingspan is about 40 mm (1.6 in). Adults are fuscous brown, the forewings speckled with lilacine atoms and suffused with golden brown on the outer marginal area. There are two faint lilac transverse lines, the outer one angled below the costa, continued across the hindwings to the middle of the margin, where it terminates in a patch of golden brown, and is outwardly bordered with the same colour. All the wings have indications of a dark submarginal band near the inner margin.
