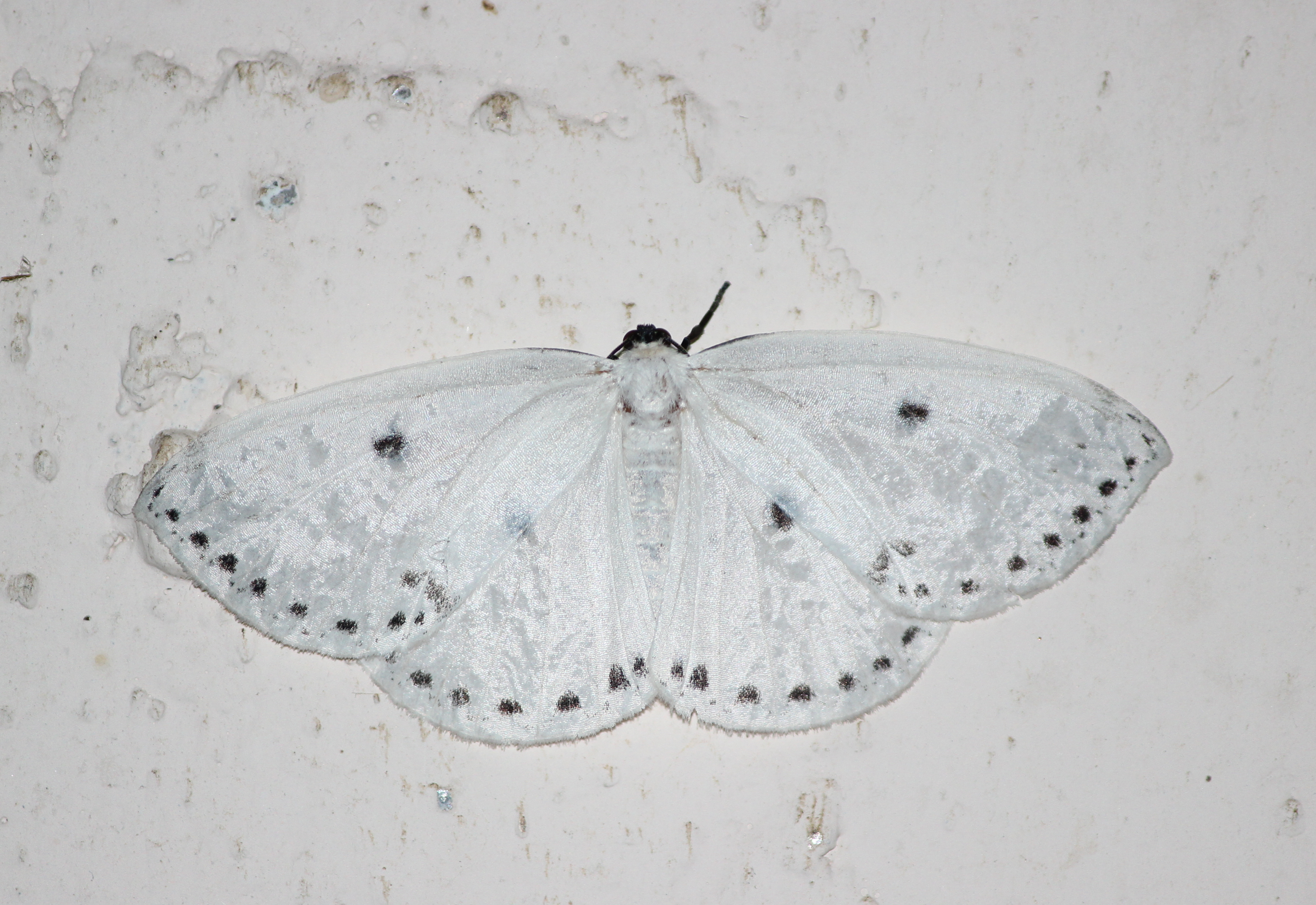

Scientific classification
- Domain: Eukaryota
- Kingdom: Animalia
- Phylum: Arthropoda
- Class: Insecta
- Order: Lepidoptera
- Family: Drepanidae
- Genus: Cyclidia
- Species: C. dictyaria

Binomial name
- Cyclidia dictyaria (C. Swinhoe, 1899)

Synonyms
- Euchera dictyaria C. Swinhoe, 1899

= Cyclidia dictyaria =

Species of hook-tip moth

Cyclidia dictyaria is a moth in the family Drepanidae. It was described by Charles Swinhoe in 1899. It is found in India.

Adults are white, the wings without any transverse markings. The forewings have a discal spot below and the hindwings have a large black spot at the end of the cell. Both wings have a submarginal row of prominent round black spots and a row of indistinct black dots between it and the margin.
