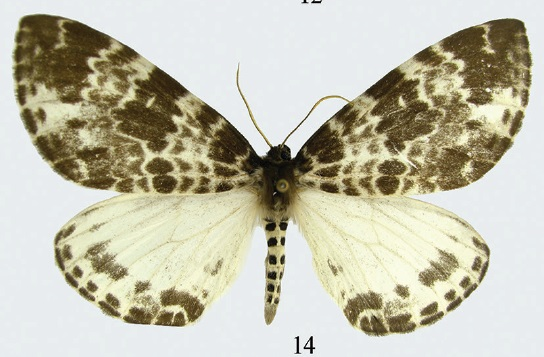
- Cyclidia fractifasciata fractifasciata
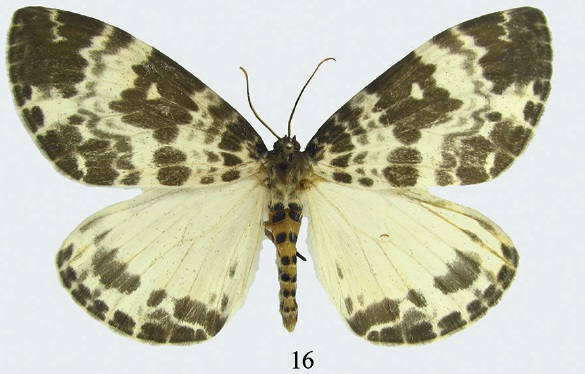
- Cyclidia fractifasciata indistincta

Scientific classification
- Domain: Eukaryota
- Kingdom: Animalia
- Phylum: Arthropoda
- Class: Insecta
- Order: Lepidoptera
- Family: Drepanidae
- Genus: Cyclidia
- Species: C. fractifasciata

Binomial name
- Cyclidia fractifasciata (Leech, 1898)

Synonyms
- Euchera fractifasciata Leech, 1898

= Cyclidia fractifasciata =

Species of hook-tip moth

Cyclidia fractifasciata is a moth in the family Drepanidae. It was described by John Henry Leech in 1898. It is found in China.

The species can be distinguished by the following characteristics: a black broad subbasal line is present on the forewing, the forewing medial line is broad at the anterior half and very narrow and dot like at posterior half. The outer margin of the forewing medial line forms an almost right angle below M3.

== Subspecies ==
- Cyclidia fractifasciata fractifasciata (China: Yunnan)
- Cyclidia fractifasciata indistincta Jiang, Han & Xue, 2016 (China: Gansu, Chongqing)
