= Cyclidia sericea =

Scientific classification
- Domain: Eukaryota
- Kingdom: Animalia
- Phylum: Arthropoda
- Class: Insecta
- Order: Lepidoptera
- Family: Drepanidae
- Genus: Cyclidia
- Species: C. sericea

Binomial name
- Cyclidia sericea Warren, 1922

Species of hook-tip moth

Cyclidia sericea is a moth in the family Drepanidae. It was described by Warren in 1922. It is found on Borneo.
