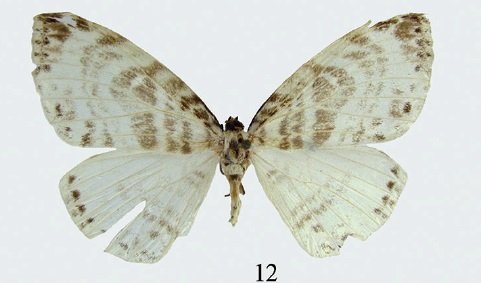

Scientific classification
- Kingdom: Animalia
- Phylum: Arthropoda
- Clade: Pancrustacea
- Class: Insecta
- Order: Lepidoptera
- Family: Drepanidae
- Genus: Cyclidia
- Species: C. pitmani

Binomial name
- Cyclidia pitmani (Moore, 1886)

Synonyms
- Euchera pitmani Moore, 1886; Cyclidia pitimani; Euchera pitimani

= Cyclidia pitmani =

Species of hook-tip moth

Cyclidia pitmani is a moth in the family Drepanidae. It was described by Frederic Moore in 1886. It is found in Myanmar and Yunnan, China.

The wingspan is 66–74 mm. The wings are white, the forewings with some fuscous marks on the basal half of the costa and a subbasal narrow line. There is a broad medial fuscous band and the discocellulars and veins crossing it are white. There is a postmedial curved line and submarginal series of spots, beyond which is a series of smaller black spots and a fuscous series on the margin. The hindwings are white, with a postmedial arid submarginal series of fuscous spots, as well as a series of black spots before the margin.
