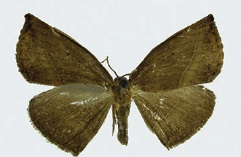
- Mimozethes angula

Scientific classification
- Kingdom: Animalia
- Phylum: Arthropoda
- Class: Insecta
- Order: Lepidoptera
- Family: Drepanidae
- Subfamily: Cyclidiinae
- Genus: Mimozethes; Warren, 1901

= Mimozethes =

Moth genus in family Drepanidae

Mimozethes is a genus of moths belonging to the subfamily Cyclidiinae. It was first described by Warren in 1901.

== Species ==
- Mimozethes angula Chu & Wang, 1987
- Mimozethes argentilinearia Leech, 1897
- Mimozethes lilacinaria Leech, 1897
