= Eupithecia venulata =

Scientific classification
- Domain: Eukaryota
- Kingdom: Animalia
- Phylum: Arthropoda
- Class: Insecta
- Order: Lepidoptera
- Family: Geometridae
- Genus: Eupithecia
- Species: E. venulata

Binomial name
- Eupithecia venulata (Warren, 1907)

Synonyms
- Tephroclystia venulata Warren, 1907

Species of moth

Eupithecia venulata is a moth in the family Geometridae. It is found in Peru.

The wingspan is about 22 mm. The forewings are grey. The lines and markings are more brownish grey, the darker lines and paler intervals forming alternating light and dark dashes on the veins. The hindwing markings are only shown on the inner margin, the costal half of wing being whitish.
