= Eupithecia dalhousiensis =

Scientific classification
- Kingdom: Animalia
- Phylum: Arthropoda
- Clade: Pancrustacea
- Class: Insecta
- Order: Lepidoptera
- Family: Geometridae
- Genus: Eupithecia
- Species: E. dalhousiensis

Binomial name
- Eupithecia dalhousiensis Mironov & Galsworthy, 2008

Synonyms
- Eupithecia interrubrescens ab. dalhousiensis Strand, 1919

Species of moth

Eupithecia dalhousiensis is a moth in the family Geometridae. It is found in Afghanistan and the western Himalayas (northern Pakistan and northern India).

The wingspan is about 24–29 mm for males and 30–37 mm for females. The fore- and hindwings are pale brown to fawn.

The larvae are thought to feed on the cones of Pinus species.
