= Eupithecia nephelata =

Scientific classification
- Domain: Eukaryota
- Kingdom: Animalia
- Phylum: Arthropoda
- Class: Insecta
- Order: Lepidoptera
- Family: Geometridae
- Genus: Eupithecia
- Species: E. nephelata

Binomial name
- Eupithecia nephelata Staudinger, 1897

Species of moth

Eupithecia nephelata is a moth in the family Geometridae. It is found in Afghanistan, Kyrgyzstan, Tajikistan, Jammu and Kashmir, western China (Xinjiang) and Mongolia.
