= Eupithecia curacautinae =

Scientific classification
- Kingdom: Animalia
- Phylum: Arthropoda
- Class: Insecta
- Order: Lepidoptera
- Family: Geometridae
- Genus: Eupithecia
- Species: E. curacautinae

Binomial name
- Eupithecia curacautinae Rindge, 1987

Species of moth

Eupithecia curacautinae is a moth in the family Geometridae. It is found in the regions of Biobio (Nuble Province) and Araucania (Malleco Province) in Chile. The habitat consists of the Northern Valdivian Forest Biotic Province.

The length of the forewings is about 7.8 mm for males and 8 mm for females. Adults have been recorded on wing in December and February.

== Etymology ==
The specific name is based on the type locality.
