= Eupithecia penicilla =

Scientific classification
- Domain: Eukaryota
- Kingdom: Animalia
- Phylum: Arthropoda
- Class: Insecta
- Order: Lepidoptera
- Family: Geometridae
- Genus: Eupithecia
- Species: E. penicilla

Binomial name
- Eupithecia penicilla Dognin, 1901

Species of moth

Eupithecia penicilla is a moth in the family Geometridae. It is found in Ecuador.
