= Eupithecia interrubescens =

Scientific classification
- Kingdom: Animalia
- Phylum: Arthropoda
- Class: Insecta
- Order: Lepidoptera
- Family: Geometridae
- Genus: Eupithecia
- Species: E. interrubescens

Binomial name
- Eupithecia interrubescens (Hampson, 1902)

Synonyms
- Phibalapteryx interrubescens Hampson, 1902

Species of moth

Eupithecia interrubescens is a moth in the family Geometridae. It is found in China (Tibet), Nepal, India and Pakistan.
