= Eupithecia fuscorufa =

Scientific classification
- Kingdom: Animalia
- Phylum: Arthropoda
- Clade: Pancrustacea
- Class: Insecta
- Order: Lepidoptera
- Family: Geometridae
- Genus: Eupithecia
- Species: E. fuscorufa

Binomial name
- Eupithecia fuscorufa Mironov & Ratzel, 2012

Species of moth

Eupithecia fuscorufa is a moth in the family Geometridae. It is found in Pakistan.
