= Eupithecia insignifica =

Scientific classification
- Kingdom: Animalia
- Phylum: Arthropoda
- Clade: Pancrustacea
- Class: Insecta
- Order: Lepidoptera
- Family: Geometridae
- Genus: Eupithecia
- Species: E. insignifica

Binomial name
- Eupithecia insignifica (Rothschild, 1914)

Synonyms
- Tephroclystia insignifica Rothschild, 1914

Species of moth

Eupithecia insignifica is a moth in the family Geometridae. It is found in Algeria.
