= Eupithecia hollowayi =

Scientific classification
- Kingdom: Animalia
- Phylum: Arthropoda
- Clade: Pancrustacea
- Class: Insecta
- Order: Lepidoptera
- Family: Geometridae
- Genus: Eupithecia
- Species: E. hollowayi

Binomial name
- Eupithecia hollowayi Mironov & Galsworthy, 2010

Species of moth

Eupithecia hollowayi is a moth in the family Geometridae. It is found on Borneo.

The wingspan is about 18 mm.
