= Eupithecia basurmanca =

Scientific classification
- Kingdom: Animalia
- Phylum: Arthropoda
- Clade: Pancrustacea
- Class: Insecta
- Order: Lepidoptera
- Family: Geometridae
- Genus: Eupithecia
- Species: E. basurmanca

Binomial name
- Eupithecia basurmanca Mironov & Ratzel, 2012

Species of moth

Eupithecia basurmanca is a moth in the family Geometridae. It is found in Iran (Mazandaran).

The wingspan is about 22 mm.
