= Eupithecia lugubris =

Scientific classification
- Domain: Eukaryota
- Kingdom: Animalia
- Phylum: Arthropoda
- Class: Insecta
- Order: Lepidoptera
- Family: Geometridae
- Genus: Eupithecia
- Species: E. lugubris

Binomial name
- Eupithecia lugubris (Warren, 1907)

Synonyms
- Tephroclystia lugubris Warren, 1907

Species of moth

Eupithecia lugubris is a moth in the family Geometridae. It is found in Peru.

The wingspan is about 23 mm. The forewings are dark fuscous, with three pale lines across each wing, each with a thick middle thread. The hindwings are paler, crossed by alternate thick and thin dark grey lines, which are strongest on the inner margin, the costal half being blurred grey.
