= Eupithecia superata =

Scientific classification
- Kingdom: Animalia
- Phylum: Arthropoda
- Clade: Pancrustacea
- Class: Insecta
- Order: Lepidoptera
- Family: Geometridae
- Genus: Eupithecia
- Species: E. superata

Binomial name
- Eupithecia superata Mironov & Galsworthy, 2010

Species of moth

Eupithecia superata is a moth in the family Geometridae. It is found in north-eastern India.

The wingspan is about 20 mm.
