= Eupithecia grappleri =

Scientific classification
- Kingdom: Animalia
- Phylum: Arthropoda
- Class: Insecta
- Order: Lepidoptera
- Family: Geometridae
- Genus: Eupithecia
- Species: E. grappleri

Binomial name
- Eupithecia grappleri Rindge, 1987

Species of moth

Eupithecia grappleri is a moth in the family Geometridae. It is found in the region of Magallanes and Antarctica Chilena (Esperanza Province) in Chile. The habitat consists of the Southern Pacific Biotic Province.

The length of the forewings is about 8.5 mm for males.

== Etymology ==
The specific name is based on the type locality.
