= Eupithecia pippa =

Scientific classification
- Kingdom: Animalia
- Phylum: Arthropoda
- Clade: Pancrustacea
- Class: Insecta
- Order: Lepidoptera
- Family: Geometridae
- Genus: Eupithecia
- Species: E. pippa

Binomial name
- Eupithecia pippa Prout, 1916

Species of moth

Eupithecia pippa is a moth in the family Geometridae. It is found in Peru.

The wingspan is about 25 mm for males. The forewings are brownish in the posterior half and red-brownish distally. The hindwings are uniform smoky coloured.
