= Eupithecia immodica =

Scientific classification
- Kingdom: Animalia
- Phylum: Arthropoda
- Clade: Pancrustacea
- Class: Insecta
- Order: Lepidoptera
- Family: Geometridae
- Genus: Eupithecia
- Species: E. immodica

Binomial name
- Eupithecia immodica Prout L.B., 1926

Species of moth

Eupithecia immodica is a moth in the family Geometridae. It is found in the Democratic Republic of Congo.
