= Eupithecia cerynea =

Scientific classification
- Domain: Eukaryota
- Kingdom: Animalia
- Phylum: Arthropoda
- Class: Insecta
- Order: Lepidoptera
- Family: Geometridae
- Genus: Eupithecia
- Species: E. cerynea

Binomial name
- Eupithecia cerynea H. Druce, 1893

Species of moth

Eupithecia cerynea is a moth in the family Geometridae. It was described by Herbert Druce in 1893. It is known from Guatemala.

The wingspan is about 25 mm (1 in). The forewings and hindwings are white with some greyish markings.
