= Eupithecia retusa =

Scientific classification
- Domain: Eukaryota
- Kingdom: Animalia
- Phylum: Arthropoda
- Class: Insecta
- Order: Lepidoptera
- Family: Geometridae
- Genus: Eupithecia
- Species: E. retusa

Binomial name
- Eupithecia retusa Kruger, 1939

Species of moth

Eupithecia retusa is a moth in the family Geometridae. It is found in Libya.
