= Eupithecia kostjuki =

Scientific classification
- Kingdom: Animalia
- Phylum: Arthropoda
- Clade: Pancrustacea
- Class: Insecta
- Order: Lepidoptera
- Family: Geometridae
- Genus: Eupithecia
- Species: E. kostjuki

Binomial name
- Eupithecia kostjuki Mironov, 1989

Species of moth

Eupithecia kostjuki is a moth in the family Geometridae. It is found in Kazakhstan (the Ala-Tau Mountains).
