= Eupithecia arenitincta =

Scientific classification
- Kingdom: Animalia
- Phylum: Arthropoda
- Clade: Pancrustacea
- Class: Insecta
- Order: Lepidoptera
- Family: Geometridae
- Genus: Eupithecia
- Species: E. arenitincta

Binomial name
- Eupithecia arenitincta Prout, 1938

Species of moth

Eupithecia arenitincta is a moth in the family Geometridae. It is found in Algeria.
