= Eupithecia cabrasae =

Scientific classification
- Kingdom: Animalia
- Phylum: Arthropoda
- Class: Insecta
- Order: Lepidoptera
- Family: Geometridae
- Genus: Eupithecia
- Species: E. cabrasae

Binomial name
- Eupithecia cabrasae Rindge, 1987

Species of moth

Eupithecia cabrasae is a moth in the family Geometridae. It is found in the region of Biobio (Nuble Province) in Chile. The habitat consists of the Northern Valdivian Forest Biotic Province.

The length of the forewings is about 8 mm for females. Adults have been recorded on wing in December.

== Etymology ==
The specific name is based on the type locality.
