= Eupithecia sylpharia =

Scientific classification
- Domain: Eukaryota
- Kingdom: Animalia
- Phylum: Arthropoda
- Class: Insecta
- Order: Lepidoptera
- Family: Geometridae
- Genus: Eupithecia
- Species: E. sylpharia

Binomial name
- Eupithecia sylpharia (Warren, 1906)

Synonyms
- Tephroclystia sylpharia Warren, 1906

Species of moth

Eupithecia sylpharia is a moth in the family Geometridae. It is found in Brazil.

The wingspan is about 15–17 mm. The forewings are pale pearly grey. The lines are alternately pale brown and grey. They are all very concise and parallel, marked on the veins and folds by minute black scales. The hindwings are whitish and the lines are dark grey and distinct only along the inner margin.
