= Eupithecia lactevirens =

Scientific classification
- Domain: Eukaryota
- Kingdom: Animalia
- Phylum: Arthropoda
- Class: Insecta
- Order: Lepidoptera
- Family: Geometridae
- Genus: Eupithecia
- Species: E. lactevirens

Binomial name
- Eupithecia lactevirens (Dognin, 1908)

Synonyms
- Tephroclystia lactevirens Dognin, 1908

Species of moth

Eupithecia lactevirens is a moth in the family Geometridae. It is found in Argentina.
