= Eupithecia nahuelbuta =

Scientific classification
- Kingdom: Animalia
- Phylum: Arthropoda
- Class: Insecta
- Order: Lepidoptera
- Family: Geometridae
- Genus: Eupithecia
- Species: E. nahuelbuta

Binomial name
- Eupithecia nahuelbuta Rindge, 1987

Species of moth

Eupithecia nahuelbuta is a moth in the family Geometridae. It is found in the region of Araucania (the Province of Malleco) in Chile. The habitat consists of the Northern Valdivian Forest Biotic Province.

The length of the forewings is about 9 mm. Adults have been recorded on wing in February.

== Etymology ==
The specific name is based on the type locality.
