= Eupithecia pilosa =

Scientific classification
- Domain: Eukaryota
- Kingdom: Animalia
- Phylum: Arthropoda
- Class: Insecta
- Order: Lepidoptera
- Family: Geometridae
- Genus: Eupithecia
- Species: E. pilosa

Binomial name
- Eupithecia pilosa (Warren, 1897)

Synonyms
- Dochephora pilosa Warren, 1897; Eupithecia malformata Schaus (manuscript name)

Species of moth

Eupithecia pilosa is a moth in the family Geometridae. It is found in Costa Rica.
