= Eupithecia mitigata =

Scientific classification
- Kingdom: Animalia
- Phylum: Arthropoda
- Class: Insecta
- Order: Lepidoptera
- Family: Geometridae
- Genus: Eupithecia
- Species: E. mitigata

Binomial name
- Eupithecia mitigata Dietze, 1906

Species of moth

Eupithecia mitigata is a moth in the family Geometridae. It is found in Afghanistan, Tajikistan, Kyrgyzstan, southern Kazakhstan, north-western China (Xinjiang) and Kashmir.

Adults are unicolorous dark grey.
