= Eupithecia lusoria =

Scientific classification
- Kingdom: Animalia
- Phylum: Arthropoda
- Clade: Pancrustacea
- Class: Insecta
- Order: Lepidoptera
- Family: Geometridae
- Genus: Eupithecia
- Species: E. lusoria

Binomial name
- Eupithecia lusoria Mironov & Galsworthy, 2010

Species of moth

Eupithecia lusoria is a moth in the family Geometridae. It is found in Nepal.

The wingspan is about 15 mm.
