= Eupithecia leucostaxis =

Scientific classification
- Kingdom: Animalia
- Phylum: Arthropoda
- Clade: Pancrustacea
- Class: Insecta
- Order: Lepidoptera
- Family: Geometridae
- Genus: Eupithecia
- Species: E. leucostaxis

Binomial name
- Eupithecia leucostaxis L.B. Prout, 1926

Synonyms
- Eupithecia deprima Vojnits, 1974

Species of moth

Eupithecia leucostaxis is a moth in the family Geometridae. It is found from the southern and western Himalaya (Nainital, Nepal, Tibet and Yunnan) to northern Myanmar.
