= Eupithecia pluripunctaria =

Scientific classification
- Domain: Eukaryota
- Kingdom: Animalia
- Phylum: Arthropoda
- Class: Insecta
- Order: Lepidoptera
- Family: Geometridae
- Genus: Eupithecia
- Species: E. pluripunctaria

Binomial name
- Eupithecia pluripunctaria (Turati, 1934)

Synonyms
- Tephroclystia pluripunctaria Turati, 1934

Species of moth

Eupithecia pluripunctaria is a moth in the family Geometridae. It is found in Libya.
