= Eupithecia elquiensis =

Scientific classification
- Kingdom: Animalia
- Phylum: Arthropoda
- Class: Insecta
- Order: Lepidoptera
- Family: Geometridae
- Genus: Eupithecia
- Species: E. elquiensis

Binomial name
- Eupithecia elquiensis Rindge, 1991

Species of moth

Eupithecia elquiensis is a moth in the family Geometridae. It is found the Region of Coquimbo (El Qui Province) in Chile. The habitat consists of the Coquimban Desert Biotic Province.

The length of the forewings is about 9.5 mm for females. Adults have been recorded on wing in October.

== Etymology ==
The specific name is based on the type locality.
