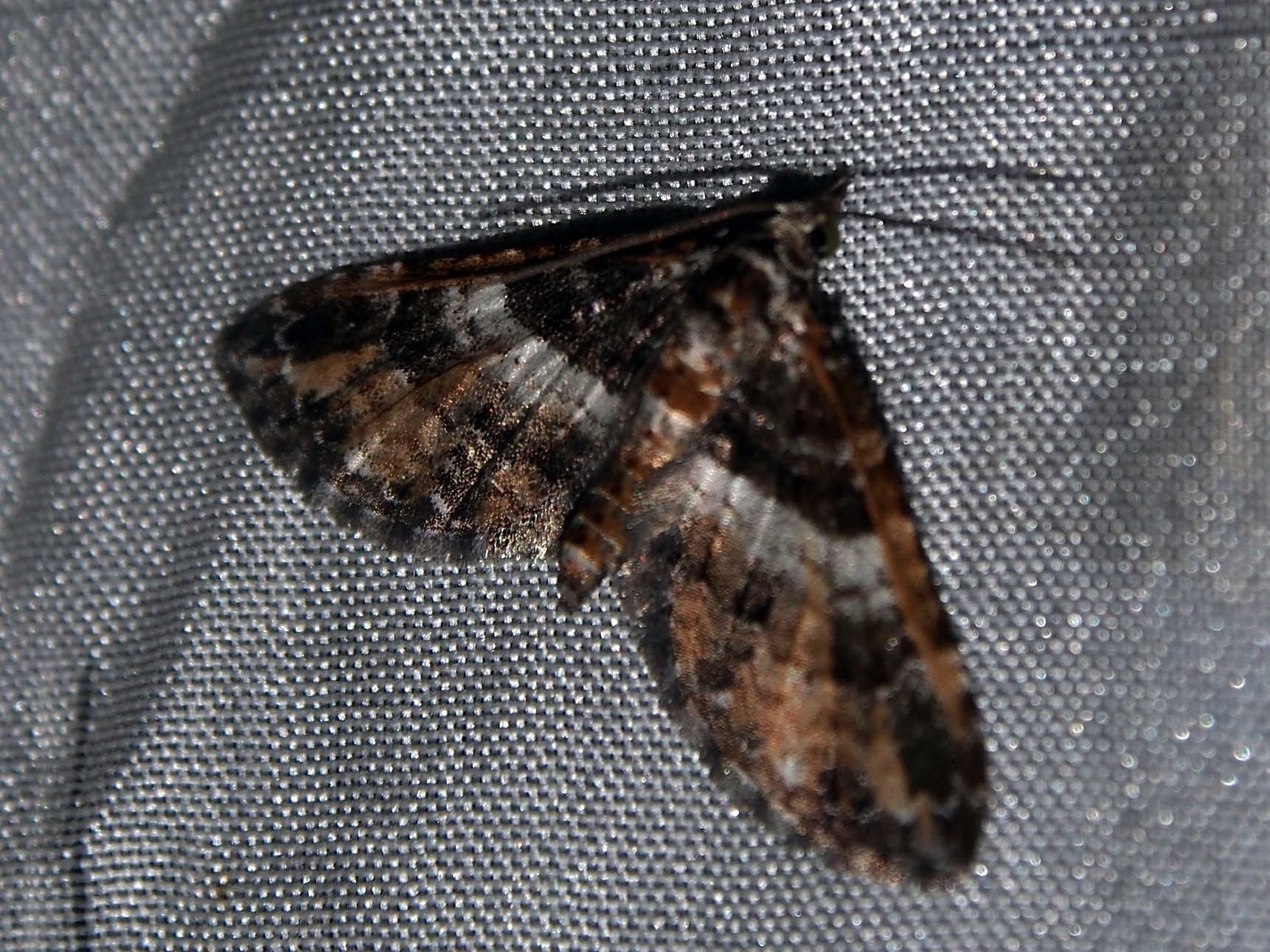

Scientific classification
- Kingdom: Animalia
- Phylum: Arthropoda
- Class: Insecta
- Order: Lepidoptera
- Family: Geometridae
- Genus: Eupithecia
- Species: E. albimixta

Binomial name
- Eupithecia albimixta Schaus, 1913

= Eupithecia albimixta =

Species of moth

Eupithecia albimixta is a species of moth in the family Geometridae. It is found in Costa Rica.
