= Eupithecia dolia =

Scientific classification
- Domain: Eukaryota
- Kingdom: Animalia
- Phylum: Arthropoda
- Class: Insecta
- Order: Lepidoptera
- Family: Geometridae
- Genus: Eupithecia
- Species: E. dolia

Binomial name
- Eupithecia dolia West, 1929

Species of moth

Eupithecia dolia is a moth in the family Geometridae. It is found on the Philippines.
