= Eupithecia correana =

Scientific classification
- Kingdom: Animalia
- Phylum: Arthropoda
- Class: Insecta
- Order: Lepidoptera
- Family: Geometridae
- Genus: Eupithecia
- Species: E. correana

Binomial name
- Eupithecia correana Rindge, 1987

Species of moth

Eupithecia correana is a moth in the family Geometridae. It is found in the regions of O'Higgins (Colchagua Province), Maule (Curico Province) and Araucania (Malleco Province) in Chile. The habitat consists of the Northern Valdivian Forest Biotic Province.

The length of the forewings is about 7.5 mm for males and 7-7.5 mm for females. Adults have been recorded on wing in January and February.

== Etymology ==
The specific name is based on the type locality.
