= Eupithecia juncalensis =

Scientific classification
- Kingdom: Animalia
- Phylum: Arthropoda
- Class: Insecta
- Order: Lepidoptera
- Family: Geometridae
- Genus: Eupithecia
- Species: E. juncalensis

Binomial name
- Eupithecia juncalensis Rindge, 1987

Species of moth

Eupithecia juncalensis is a moth in the family Geometridae. It is found in the Valparaíso Region (Aconcagua Province) in Chile. The habitat consists of the Central Valley Biotic Province.

The length of the forewings is about 9 mm for males and 9.5 mm for females. Adults have been recorded on wing in November.

== Etymology ==
The specific name is based on the type locality.
