= Eupithecia amurensis =

Scientific classification
- Kingdom: Animalia
- Phylum: Arthropoda
- Class: Insecta
- Order: Lepidoptera
- Family: Geometridae
- Genus: Eupithecia
- Species: E. amurensis

Binomial name
- Eupithecia amurensis Schwingenschuss, 1954

Species of moth

Eupithecia amurensis is a moth belonging to the family Geometridae. It is found in Russia (Amur).
