= Eupithecia naumanni =

Scientific classification
- Kingdom: Animalia
- Phylum: Arthropoda
- Clade: Pancrustacea
- Class: Insecta
- Order: Lepidoptera
- Family: Geometridae
- Genus: Eupithecia
- Species: E. naumanni

Binomial name
- Eupithecia naumanni Mironov & Ratzel, 2012

Species of moth

Eupithecia naumanni is a moth in the family Geometridae. It was described by Vladimir G. Mironov and Ulrich Ratzel in 2012. It is found in eastern Afghanistan. It is named after Clas Naumann, German lepidopterologist.

The wingspan is 20.5–25 mm (0.81–0.98 in).
