= Eupithecia olgae =

Scientific classification
- Kingdom: Animalia
- Phylum: Arthropoda
- Clade: Pancrustacea
- Class: Insecta
- Order: Lepidoptera
- Family: Geometridae
- Genus: Eupithecia
- Species: E. olgae

Binomial name
- Eupithecia olgae Mironov, 1986

Species of moth

Eupithecia olgae is a moth in the family Geometridae. It is found in Uzbekistan, Kyrgyzstan, Tajikistan, Afghanistan, Pakistan, India (Jammu & Kashmir), south-eastern Kazakhstan, China (Tibet, Qinghai, Gansu, Shanxi) and Mongolia.
