= Eupithecia acutula =

Scientific classification
- Domain: Eukaryota
- Kingdom: Animalia
- Phylum: Arthropoda
- Class: Insecta
- Order: Lepidoptera
- Family: Geometridae
- Genus: Eupithecia
- Species: E. acutula

Binomial name
- Eupithecia acutula (Turati & Kruger, 1936)

Synonyms
- Tephroclystia acutula Turati & Kruger, 1936

Species of geometer moth

The Eupithecia acutula is a moth in the family Geometridae. It can be found in Libya.
