= Eupithecia elissa =

Scientific classification
- Domain: Eukaryota
- Kingdom: Animalia
- Phylum: Arthropoda
- Class: Insecta
- Order: Lepidoptera
- Family: Geometridae
- Genus: Eupithecia
- Species: E. elissa

Binomial name
- Eupithecia elissa Dietze, 1910

Species of moth

Eupithecia elissa is a moth in the family Geometridae first described by Karl Dietze in 1910. It is found in Tunisia.
