= Eupithecia orsetilla =

Scientific classification
- Domain: Eukaryota
- Kingdom: Animalia
- Phylum: Arthropoda
- Class: Insecta
- Order: Lepidoptera
- Family: Geometridae
- Genus: Eupithecia
- Species: E. orsetilla

Binomial name
- Eupithecia orsetilla H. Druce, 1893

Species of moth

Eupithecia orsetilla is a moth in the family Geometridae It was described by Herbert Druce in 1893. It is known from southern Mexico (Guerrero, Tabasco), Guatemala, and Costa Rica.

The wingspan is about 18 mm (7/10 in).
