= Eupithecia nigripennis =

Scientific classification
- Domain: Eukaryota
- Kingdom: Animalia
- Phylum: Arthropoda
- Class: Insecta
- Order: Lepidoptera
- Family: Geometridae
- Genus: Eupithecia
- Species: E. nigripennis

Binomial name
- Eupithecia nigripennis (Warren, 1907)

Synonyms
- Tephroclystia nigripennis Warren, 1907

Species of moth

Eupithecia nigripennis is a moth in the family Geometridae. It is found in Peru.

The wingspan is about 14 mm. The forewings are dark flesh-coloured, except at the costa, where they are darkened with brownish. The hindwings are purplish black, crossed by five or six lines.
