= Eupithecia perfica =

Scientific classification
- Domain: Eukaryota
- Kingdom: Animalia
- Phylum: Arthropoda
- Class: Insecta
- Order: Lepidoptera
- Family: Geometridae
- Genus: Eupithecia
- Species: E. perfica

Binomial name
- Eupithecia perfica (Schaus, 1929)

Synonyms
- Eucymatoge perfica Schaus, 1929

Species of moth

Eupithecia perfica is a moth in the family Geometridae. It is found in Brazil.
