= Eupithecia uvaria =

Scientific classification
- Domain: Eukaryota
- Kingdom: Animalia
- Phylum: Arthropoda
- Class: Insecta
- Order: Lepidoptera
- Family: Geometridae
- Genus: Eupithecia
- Species: E. uvaria

Binomial name
- Eupithecia uvaria (Warren, 1906)

Synonyms
- Tephroclystia uvaria Warren, 1906

Species of moth

Eupithecia uvaria is a moth in the family Geometridae. It is found in Brazil.

The wingspan is about 17 mm. The forewings are dull pale brown, the costa, central fascia and anal region blackish, all with a slight greenish tinge. All the lines are obscure, but well marked on the costa. The hindwings are brown, the inner marginal half dark fuscous, through which can be traced several faint pale transverse lines, especially the submarginal line.
