= Eupithecia arauco =

Scientific classification
- Kingdom: Animalia
- Phylum: Arthropoda
- Class: Insecta
- Order: Lepidoptera
- Family: Geometridae
- Genus: Eupithecia
- Species: E. arauco

Binomial name
- Eupithecia arauco Rindge, 1991

Species of moth

Eupithecia arauco is a moth in the family Geometridae. It is found the Region of Biobio (Arauco Province) in Chile. The habitat consists of the Northern Valdivian Forest Biotic Province.

The length of the forewings is about 9.5 mm for females.
