= Eupithecia vacuata =

Scientific classification
- Domain: Eukaryota
- Kingdom: Animalia
- Phylum: Arthropoda
- Class: Insecta
- Order: Lepidoptera
- Family: Geometridae
- Genus: Eupithecia
- Species: E. vacuata

Binomial name
- Eupithecia vacuata Dietze, 1904

Species of moth

Eupithecia vacuata is a moth in the family Geometridae. It is found in central Asia.
