= Eupithecia oenone =

Scientific classification
- Kingdom: Animalia
- Phylum: Arthropoda
- Class: Insecta
- Order: Lepidoptera
- Family: Geometridae
- Genus: Eupithecia
- Species: E. oenone

Binomial name
- Eupithecia oenone Butler, 1882

Species of moth

Eupithecia oenone is a moth in the family Geometridae. It is found in the regions of Antofagasta (Antofagasta Province), Coquimbo (Limari Province), Valparaiso (Aconcagua and Valparaiso provinces), Maule (Curico and Cauquenes provinces) and Los Lagos (Osorno, Llanquihue and Chiloe provinces) in Chile. The habitat consists of the Northern Coast, Coquimban Desert, Central Valley and Valdivian Forest biotic provinces.

The length of the forewings is about 8.5–9 mm for males and 9.5–10.5 mm for females. Adults have been recorded on wing in September, November, December, January and March.
