= Eupithecia trita =

Scientific classification
- Domain: Eukaryota
- Kingdom: Animalia
- Phylum: Arthropoda
- Class: Insecta
- Order: Lepidoptera
- Family: Geometridae
- Genus: Eupithecia
- Species: E. trita

Binomial name
- Eupithecia trita (Turati, 1926)

Synonyms
- Tephroclystia trita Turati, 1926

Species of moth

Eupithecia trita is a moth in the family Geometridae. It is found in Libya.
