= Eupithecia relictata =

Scientific classification
- Domain: Eukaryota
- Kingdom: Animalia
- Phylum: Arthropoda
- Class: Insecta
- Order: Lepidoptera
- Family: Geometridae
- Genus: Eupithecia
- Species: E. relictata

Binomial name
- Eupithecia relictata Dietze, 1904

Synonyms
- Eupithecia relinquata Dietze, 1910

Species of moth

Eupithecia relictata is a moth in the family Geometridae. It is found in central Asia.
