= Eupithecia candidata =

Scientific classification
- Domain: Eukaryota
- Kingdom: Animalia
- Phylum: Arthropoda
- Class: Insecta
- Order: Lepidoptera
- Family: Geometridae
- Genus: Eupithecia
- Species: E. candidata

Binomial name
- Eupithecia candidata (Warren, 1907)

Synonyms
- Tephroclystia candidata Warren, 1907

Species of moth

Eupithecia candidata is a moth in the family Geometridae. It is found in Peru.
