= Eupithecia dzhirgatalensis =

Scientific classification
- Kingdom: Animalia
- Phylum: Arthropoda
- Class: Insecta
- Order: Lepidoptera
- Family: Geometridae
- Genus: Eupithecia
- Species: E. dzhirgatalensis

Binomial name
- Eupithecia dzhirgatalensis Viidalepp, 1988

Species of moth

Eupithecia dzhirgatalensis is a moth in the family Geometridae. It is found in Tajikistan and Pakistan.
