= Eupithecia mustangata =

Scientific classification
- Domain: Eukaryota
- Kingdom: Animalia
- Phylum: Arthropoda
- Class: Insecta
- Order: Lepidoptera
- Family: Geometridae
- Genus: Eupithecia
- Species: E. mustangata

Binomial name
- Eupithecia mustangata Schütze, 1961

Synonyms
- Eupithecia emikoae Inoue, 1996

Species of moth

Eupithecia mustangata is a moth in the family Geometridae. It is found in Afghanistan, northern Pakistan, Jammu & Kashmir, northern India (Himachal Pradesh) and Nepal. It is found at altitudes between 2,100 and 4,300 meters.
