= Eupithecia nublae =

Scientific classification
- Kingdom: Animalia
- Phylum: Arthropoda
- Class: Insecta
- Order: Lepidoptera
- Family: Geometridae
- Genus: Eupithecia
- Species: E. nublae

Binomial name
- Eupithecia nublae Rindge, 1987

Species of moth

Eupithecia nublae is a moth in the family Geometridae. It is found in the Region of Biobio (Nuble Province) in Chile. The habitat consists of the Northern Valdivian Forest Biotic Province.

The length of the forewings is about 10.6 mm for females.
