= Eupithecia acyrtoterma =

Scientific classification
- Kingdom: Animalia
- Phylum: Arthropoda
- Clade: Pancrustacea
- Class: Insecta
- Order: Lepidoptera
- Family: Geometridae
- Genus: Eupithecia
- Species: E. acyrtoterma

Binomial name
- Eupithecia acyrtoterma L.B. Prout, 1926

Species of geometer moth

Eupithecia acyrtoterma is a moth in the family Geometridae. It is found in northern Myanmar.

Adults are pale grey on both the fore- and hindwings.
