= Eupithecia claudei =

Scientific classification
- Kingdom: Animalia
- Phylum: Arthropoda
- Clade: Pancrustacea
- Class: Insecta
- Order: Lepidoptera
- Family: Geometridae
- Genus: Eupithecia
- Species: E. claudei

Binomial name
- Eupithecia claudei Mironov & Galsworthy, 2010

Species of moth

Eupithecia claudei is a moth in the family Geometridae. It is found in Nepal.

The wingspan is about 18 mm. The fore- and hindwings are light brown and pale yellow.
