= Eupithecia uighurica =

Scientific classification
- Domain: Eukaryota
- Kingdom: Animalia
- Phylum: Arthropoda
- Class: Insecta
- Order: Lepidoptera
- Family: Geometridae
- Genus: Eupithecia
- Species: E. uighurica

Binomial name
- Eupithecia uighurica Kocak, 2004

Synonyms
- Eupithecia lutulenta Dietze, 1913 (preocc.)

Species of moth

Eupithecia uighurica is a moth in the family Geometridae. It is found in central Asia.
