= Eupithecia osornoensis =

Scientific classification
- Kingdom: Animalia
- Phylum: Arthropoda
- Class: Insecta
- Order: Lepidoptera
- Family: Geometridae
- Genus: Eupithecia
- Species: E. osornoensis

Binomial name
- Eupithecia osornoensis Rindge, 1987

Species of moth

Eupithecia osornoensis is a moth in the family Geometridae. It is found in the Region of Los Lagos (coastal Osomo Province) in Chile. The habitat consists of the Valdivian Forest Biotic Province.

The length of the forewings is about 9 mm for males and 8 mm for females. Adults have been recorded on wing in February.

== Etymology ==
The specific name is derived from the type locality.
