= Eupithecia brunneilutea =

Scientific classification
- Kingdom: Animalia
- Phylum: Arthropoda
- Clade: Pancrustacea
- Class: Insecta
- Order: Lepidoptera
- Family: Geometridae
- Genus: Eupithecia
- Species: E. brunneilutea

Binomial name
- Eupithecia brunneilutea Mironov & Galsworthy, 2004

Species of moth

Eupithecia brunneilutea is a moth in the family Geometridae. It is found in south-western China (Yunnan) and Nepal.

The wingspan is about 19 to 21 millimetres (0.75 to 0.83 in). The fore- and hindwings are creamy white.
