= Eupithecia albibasalis =

Scientific classification
- Domain: Eukaryota
- Kingdom: Animalia
- Phylum: Arthropoda
- Class: Insecta
- Order: Lepidoptera
- Family: Geometridae
- Genus: Eupithecia
- Species: E. albibasalis

Binomial name
- Eupithecia albibasalis Schaus, 1913

Species of moth

Eupithecia albibasalis is a moth in the family Geometridae. It is found in Costa Rica.
