= Eupithecia pyricoetes =

Scientific classification
- Kingdom: Animalia
- Phylum: Arthropoda
- Clade: Pancrustacea
- Class: Insecta
- Order: Lepidoptera
- Family: Geometridae
- Genus: Eupithecia
- Species: E. pyricoetes

Binomial name
- Eupithecia pyricoetes Prout, 1958

Species of moth

Eupithecia pyricoetes is a moth in the family Geometridae. It is found in Nepal, north-eastern India and Sikkim.
