= Eupithecia persidis =

Scientific classification
- Kingdom: Animalia
- Phylum: Arthropoda
- Clade: Pancrustacea
- Class: Insecta
- Order: Lepidoptera
- Family: Geometridae
- Genus: Eupithecia
- Species: E. persidis

Binomial name
- Eupithecia persidis Mironov & Ratzel, 2012

Species of moth

Eupithecia persidis is a moth in the family Geometridae. It is found in Iran (Mazandaran). The habitat consists of mountainous steppe with feather grass.

The wingspan is 16.5–19 mm (0.65–0.75 in).
