= Eupithecia fumimixta =

Scientific classification
- Domain: Eukaryota
- Kingdom: Animalia
- Phylum: Arthropoda
- Class: Insecta
- Order: Lepidoptera
- Family: Geometridae
- Genus: Eupithecia
- Species: E. fumimixta

Binomial name
- Eupithecia fumimixta (Warren, 1900)

Synonyms
- Tephroclystia fumimixta Warren, 1900; Eupithecia cariosa Schaus, 1913

Species of moth

Eupithecia fumimixta is a moth in the family Geometridae. It is found in Costa Rica.
