= Eupithecia weigti =

Scientific classification
- Domain: Eukaryota
- Kingdom: Animalia
- Phylum: Arthropoda
- Class: Insecta
- Order: Lepidoptera
- Family: Geometridae
- Genus: Eupithecia
- Species: E. weigti

Binomial name
- Eupithecia weigti Mironov & Ratzel, 2012

Species of moth

Eupithecia weigti is a moth in the family Geometridae first described by Vladimir G. Mironov and Ulrich Ratzel in 2012. It is found in Syria.
