= Eupithecia perolivata =

Scientific classification
- Domain: Eukaryota
- Kingdom: Animalia
- Phylum: Arthropoda
- Class: Insecta
- Order: Lepidoptera
- Family: Geometridae
- Genus: Eupithecia
- Species: E. perolivata

Binomial name
- Eupithecia perolivata (Warren 1906)

Synonyms
- Tephroclystia perolivata Warren, 1906; Tephroclystia lutulenta Warren, 1907

Species of moth

Eupithecia perolivata is a moth in the family Geometridae. It is found in Peru.

The wingspan is about 22 mm. The forewings are dull olive luteous, somewhat thinly scaled. The outer half of the wing from just beyond the large black cell-spot, is of a darker hue than the basal part. The hindwings are similar to the forewings.
