= Eupithecia lindti =

Scientific classification
- Kingdom: Animalia
- Phylum: Arthropoda
- Clade: Pancrustacea
- Class: Insecta
- Order: Lepidoptera
- Family: Geometridae
- Genus: Eupithecia
- Species: E. lindti

Binomial name
- Eupithecia lindti Viidalepp, 1988

Synonyms
- Eupithecia hangayorum Vojnits, 1988

Species of moth

Eupithecia lindti is a moth in the family Geometridae. It is found in Afghanistan, the mountains of Uzbekistan, Tajikistan, and northern Pakistan and India.

The species was first described by Jaan Viidalepp in 1988.
