= Eupithecia thermosaria =

Scientific classification
- Kingdom: Animalia
- Phylum: Arthropoda
- Class: Insecta
- Order: Lepidoptera
- Family: Geometridae
- Genus: Eupithecia
- Species: E. thermosaria

Binomial name
- Eupithecia thermosaria Hampson, 1903

Synonyms
- Eupithecia jaani Mironov, 1989

Species of moth

Eupithecia thermosaria is a moth in the family Geometridae. It is found in Afghanistan, Jammu & Kashmir, Kyrgyzstan and Tajikistan. The habitat consists of mountainous areas at altitudes between 2,800 and 4,500 meters.
