= Eupithecia inexpiata =

Scientific classification
- Kingdom: Animalia
- Phylum: Arthropoda
- Class: Insecta
- Order: Lepidoptera
- Family: Geometridae
- Genus: Eupithecia
- Species: E. inexpiata

Binomial name
- Eupithecia inexpiata Walker, 1863

Species of moth

Eupithecia inexpiata is a moth in the family Geometridae. The original description states the species is from New Zealand, this is in error, and the specimen is probably from Chile. The habitat consists of the Central Valley Biotic Province.
