= Eupithecia latitans =

Scientific classification
- Domain: Eukaryota
- Kingdom: Animalia
- Phylum: Arthropoda
- Class: Insecta
- Order: Lepidoptera
- Family: Geometridae
- Genus: Eupithecia
- Species: E. latitans

Binomial name
- Eupithecia latitans (Warren, 1905)

Synonyms
- Tephroclystia latitans Warren, 1905

Species of moth

Eupithecia latitans is a moth in the family Geometridae. It is found in Peru.

The wingspan is about 18 mm. The forewings are pale greenish grey, powdered with olive scales. The shadings are olive. The hindwings are similar, but all the markings are less definite.
