= Eupithecia assectata =

Scientific classification
- Domain: Eukaryota
- Kingdom: Animalia
- Phylum: Arthropoda
- Class: Insecta
- Order: Lepidoptera
- Family: Geometridae
- Genus: Eupithecia
- Species: E. assectata

Binomial name
- Eupithecia assectata Dietze, 1904

Species of moth

Eupithecia assectata is a moth in the family Geometridae. It is found in Uzbekistan, Tajikistan, Kyrgyzstan, Afghanistan and Kashmir. It is found at altitudes between 2,350 and 3,750 meters.
