= Eupithecia exicterata =

Scientific classification
- Kingdom: Animalia
- Phylum: Arthropoda
- Clade: Pancrustacea
- Class: Insecta
- Order: Lepidoptera
- Family: Geometridae
- Genus: Eupithecia
- Species: E. exicterata

Binomial name
- Eupithecia exicterata Mironov & Ratzel, 2008

Species of moth

Eupithecia exicterata is a moth in the family Geometridae. It is found in the western Himalayas (Pakistan and India) and in Afghanistan.

The wingspan is 21–25 mm (0.83–0.98 in).
