= Eupithecia bicubitata =

Scientific classification
- Kingdom: Animalia
- Phylum: Arthropoda
- Clade: Pancrustacea
- Class: Insecta
- Order: Lepidoptera
- Family: Geometridae
- Genus: Eupithecia
- Species: E. bicubitata

Binomial name
- Eupithecia bicubitata Prout, 1916

Species of moth

Eupithecia bicubitata is a moth in the family Geometridae. It is found in Peru.

The wingspan is about 28 mm for females. The forewings are glossy white, clouded with greyish fuscous and irrorated with darker fuscous. The hindwings are dirty whitish, suffused with greyish fuscous.
