= Eupithecia malchoensis =

Scientific classification
- Kingdom: Animalia
- Phylum: Arthropoda
- Class: Insecta
- Order: Lepidoptera
- Family: Geometridae
- Genus: Eupithecia
- Species: E. malchoensis

Binomial name
- Eupithecia malchoensis Rindge, 1987

Species of moth

Eupithecia malchoensis is a moth in the family Geometridae. It is found in the regions of Maule (Linares Province) and Biobio (Nuble Province) in Chile. The habitat consists of the Central Valley Biotic Province.

The length of the forewings is about 8.5 mm for males and 10 mm for females. Adults have been recorded on wing in November and December.

== Etymology ==
The specific name is based on the type locality.
