= Eupithecia vallenarensis =

Scientific classification
- Kingdom: Animalia
- Phylum: Arthropoda
- Class: Insecta
- Order: Lepidoptera
- Family: Geometridae
- Genus: Eupithecia
- Species: E. vallenarensis

Binomial name
- Eupithecia vallenarensis Rindge, 1987

Species of moth

Eupithecia vallenarensis is a moth in the family Geometridae. It is found in the regions of Atacama (Huasco Province), Coquimbo (Limari Province), Santiago (Santiago Province), Maule (Linares Province) and Biobio (Biobio Province) in Chile. The habitat consists of the Intermediate Desert, Coquimban Desert, Central Valley and Northern Valdivian Forest biotic provinces.

The length of the forewings is about 8.5-9.1 mm for females. Adults have been recorded on wing in October, November, December and January.

== Etymology ==
The specific name is based on the type locality.
