= Eupithecia trancasae =

Scientific classification
- Kingdom: Animalia
- Phylum: Arthropoda
- Class: Insecta
- Order: Lepidoptera
- Family: Geometridae
- Genus: Eupithecia
- Species: E. trancasae

Binomial name
- Eupithecia trancasae Rindge, 1987

Species of moth

Eupithecia trancasae is a moth in the family Geometridae. It is found in the region of Biobio (Nuble Province) in Chile. The habitat consists of the Northern Valdivian Forest Biotic Province.

The length of the forewings is about 7.5 mm for males and 8 mm for females. Adults have been recorded on wing in December and February.
