= Eupithecia spilocyma =

Scientific classification
- Kingdom: Animalia
- Phylum: Arthropoda
- Clade: Pancrustacea
- Class: Insecta
- Order: Lepidoptera
- Family: Geometridae
- Genus: Eupithecia
- Species: E. spilocyma

Binomial name
- Eupithecia spilocyma Prout, 1931

Species of moth

Eupithecia spilocyma is a moth in the family Geometridae. It is found on the Philippines (Luzon).
