= Eupithecia purpureoviridis =

Scientific classification
- Domain: Eukaryota
- Kingdom: Animalia
- Phylum: Arthropoda
- Class: Insecta
- Order: Lepidoptera
- Family: Geometridae
- Genus: Eupithecia
- Species: E. purpureoviridis

Binomial name
- Eupithecia purpureoviridis (Warren, 1900)

Synonyms
- Tephroclystia purpureoviridis Warren, 1900

Species of moth

Eupithecia purpureoviridis is a moth in the family Geometridae first described by William Warren in 1900. It is found in Ecuador.
