= Eupithecia christophi =

Scientific classification
- Kingdom: Animalia
- Phylum: Arthropoda
- Clade: Pancrustacea
- Class: Insecta
- Order: Lepidoptera
- Family: Geometridae
- Genus: Eupithecia
- Species: E. christophi

Binomial name
- Eupithecia christophi Mironov, 1988

Species of moth

Eupithecia christophi is a moth in the family Geometridae. It is found in southern Transcaucasia.
