= Eupithecia maerkerata =

Scientific classification
- Domain: Eukaryota
- Kingdom: Animalia
- Phylum: Arthropoda
- Class: Insecta
- Order: Lepidoptera
- Family: Geometridae
- Genus: Eupithecia
- Species: E. maerkerata

Binomial name
- Eupithecia maerkerata Schütze, 1961

Species of moth

Eupithecia maerkerata is a moth in the family Geometridae. It is found in the United Arab Emirates.
