= Eupithecia duena =

Scientific classification
- Domain: Eukaryota
- Kingdom: Animalia
- Phylum: Arthropoda
- Class: Insecta
- Order: Lepidoptera
- Family: Geometridae
- Genus: Eupithecia
- Species: E. duena

Binomial name
- Eupithecia duena Dognin, 1899

Synonyms
- Tephroclystia biundulifera Bastelberger, 1908; Eupithecia cabria Dognin, 1899; Tephroclystia macrocyclata Bastelberger, 1908; Tephroclystia melaleucata Bastelberger, 1908; Tephroclystia suffecta Warren, 1904; Eupithecia trapezoida Dognin, 1899

Species of moth

Eupithecia duena is a moth in the family Geometridae. It is found in Ecuador and Peru.
