= Eupithecia leamariae =

Scientific classification
- Domain: Eukaryota
- Kingdom: Animalia
- Phylum: Arthropoda
- Class: Insecta
- Order: Lepidoptera
- Family: Geometridae
- Genus: Eupithecia
- Species: E. leamariae

Binomial name
- Eupithecia leamariae Ratzel, 2011

Species of moth

Eupithecia leamariae is a moth in the family Geometridae. It is found in Bhutan.
