= Eupithecia truschi =

Scientific classification
- Kingdom: Animalia
- Phylum: Arthropoda
- Clade: Pancrustacea
- Class: Insecta
- Order: Lepidoptera
- Family: Geometridae
- Genus: Eupithecia
- Species: E. truschi

Binomial name
- Eupithecia truschi Ratzel & Mironov, 2012

Species of moth

Eupithecia truschi is a moth in the family Geometridae. It is found in central Iran (Markazi and Esfahan).

The wingspan is 15.5–19 mm.

== Etymology ==
The species is named in honour of the geometrid specialist Robert Trusch.
