= Eupithecia tshimkentensis =

Scientific classification
- Domain: Eukaryota
- Kingdom: Animalia
- Phylum: Arthropoda
- Class: Insecta
- Order: Lepidoptera
- Family: Geometridae
- Genus: Eupithecia
- Species: E. tshimkentensis

Binomial name
- Eupithecia tshimkentensis Viidalepp, 1988

Species of moth

Eupithecia tshimkentensis is a moth in the family Geometridae first described by Viidalepp in 1988. It is found in the Russian Far East.

The wingspan is 18–21.5 mm. Adults are dark grey.
