= Eupithecia turkmena =

Scientific classification
- Kingdom: Animalia
- Phylum: Arthropoda
- Clade: Pancrustacea
- Class: Insecta
- Order: Lepidoptera
- Family: Geometridae
- Genus: Eupithecia
- Species: E. turkmena

Binomial name
- Eupithecia turkmena Mironov, 1989

Species of moth

Eupithecia turkmena is a moth in the family Geometridae. It is found in Turkmenistan.
