= Eupithecia tshimganica =

Scientific classification
- Domain: Eukaryota
- Kingdom: Animalia
- Phylum: Arthropoda
- Class: Insecta
- Order: Lepidoptera
- Family: Geometridae
- Genus: Eupithecia
- Species: E. tshimganica

Binomial name
- Eupithecia tshimganica Viidalepp, 1988

Synonyms
- Eupithecia subomnigera Vojnits, 1988

Species of moth

Eupithecia tshimganica is a moth in the family Geometridae. It is found in Afghanistan, Uzbekistan and Tajikistan.

Adults are pale yellowish or yellow-grey.
