= Eupithecia thomasina =

Scientific classification
- Kingdom: Animalia
- Phylum: Arthropoda
- Clade: Pancrustacea
- Class: Insecta
- Order: Lepidoptera
- Family: Geometridae
- Genus: Eupithecia
- Species: E. thomasina

Binomial name
- Eupithecia thomasina L. B. Prout, 1927

Species of moth

Eupithecia thomasina is a moth in the family Geometridae. It is found on São Tomé.
