= Eupithecia extinctata =

Scientific classification
- Domain: Eukaryota
- Kingdom: Animalia
- Phylum: Arthropoda
- Class: Insecta
- Order: Lepidoptera
- Family: Geometridae
- Genus: Eupithecia
- Species: E. extinctata

Binomial name
- Eupithecia extinctata Dietze, 1904

Species of moth

Eupithecia extinctata is a moth in the family Geometridae. It is found in Tibet.

The wingspan is about 20 mm wide.
