= Eupithecia physocleora =

Scientific classification
- Kingdom: Animalia
- Phylum: Arthropoda
- Clade: Pancrustacea
- Class: Insecta
- Order: Lepidoptera
- Family: Geometridae
- Genus: Eupithecia
- Species: E. physocleora

Binomial name
- Eupithecia physocleora Prout, 1922

Species of moth

Eupithecia physocleora is a moth in the family Geometridae. It is found on the Juan Fernandez Islands in Chile.
