= Eupithecia juntasae =

Scientific classification
- Kingdom: Animalia
- Phylum: Arthropoda
- Class: Insecta
- Order: Lepidoptera
- Family: Geometridae
- Genus: Eupithecia
- Species: E. juntasae

Binomial name
- Eupithecia juntasae Rindge, 1991

Species of moth

Eupithecia juntasae is a moth in the family Geometridae. It is found the Region of Coquimbo (El Qui Province) in Chile. The habitat consists of the Coquimban Desert Biotic Province.
