= Eupithecia costirufaria =

Scientific classification
- Domain: Eukaryota
- Kingdom: Animalia
- Phylum: Arthropoda
- Class: Insecta
- Order: Lepidoptera
- Family: Geometridae
- Genus: Eupithecia
- Species: E. costirufaria

Binomial name
- Eupithecia costirufaria (Warren, 1907)

Synonyms
- Eucymatoge costirufaria Warren, 1907

Species of moth

Eupithecia costirufaria is a moth in the family Geometridae. It is found in Peru.
