= Eupithecia graciliata =

Scientific classification
- Domain: Eukaryota
- Kingdom: Animalia
- Phylum: Arthropoda
- Class: Insecta
- Order: Lepidoptera
- Family: Geometridae
- Genus: Eupithecia
- Species: E. graciliata

Binomial name
- Eupithecia graciliata Dietze, 1906

Species of moth

Eupithecia graciliata is a moth in the family Geometridae. It is found in the nation of Georgia.
