= Eupithecia tritaria =

Scientific classification
- Kingdom: Animalia
- Phylum: Arthropoda
- Class: Insecta
- Order: Lepidoptera
- Family: Geometridae
- Genus: Eupithecia
- Species: E. tritaria

Binomial name
- Eupithecia tritaria Walker, 1863

Species of moth

Eupithecia tritaria is a moth in the family Geometridae. It is found in Venezuela.
