= Eupithecia lunata =

Scientific classification
- Domain: Eukaryota
- Kingdom: Animalia
- Phylum: Arthropoda
- Class: Insecta
- Order: Lepidoptera
- Family: Geometridae
- Genus: Eupithecia
- Species: E. lunata

Binomial name
- Eupithecia lunata Dietze, 1910

Species of moth

Eupithecia lunata is a moth in the family Geometridae.
