= Eupithecia anita =

Scientific classification
- Domain: Eukaryota
- Kingdom: Animalia
- Phylum: Arthropoda
- Class: Insecta
- Order: Lepidoptera
- Family: Geometridae
- Genus: Eupithecia
- Species: E. anita

Binomial name
- Eupithecia anita (Warren, 1906)

Synonyms
- Tephroclystia anita Warren, 1906

Species of moth

Eupithecia anita is a moth in the family Geometridae first described by William Warren in 1906. It is found in Panama.
