= Eupithecia minucia =

Scientific classification
- Domain: Eukaryota
- Kingdom: Animalia
- Phylum: Arthropoda
- Class: Insecta
- Order: Lepidoptera
- Family: Geometridae
- Genus: Eupithecia
- Species: E. minucia

Binomial name
- Eupithecia minucia Dognin, 1899

Synonyms
- Tephroclystia filiola Bastelberger, 1908; Eupithecia multicia Bastelberger, 1911

Species of moth

Eupithecia minucia is a moth in the family Geometridae. It is found in Ecuador, Colombia and Bolivia.
