= Eupithecia shachdarensis =

Scientific classification
- Domain: Eukaryota
- Kingdom: Animalia
- Phylum: Arthropoda
- Class: Insecta
- Order: Lepidoptera
- Family: Geometridae
- Genus: Eupithecia
- Species: E. shachdarensis

Binomial name
- Eupithecia shachdarensis Viidalepp, 1988

Species of moth

Eupithecia shachdarensis is a moth in the family Geometridae.
