= Eupithecia egregiata =

Scientific classification
- Kingdom: Animalia
- Phylum: Arthropoda
- Clade: Pancrustacea
- Class: Insecta
- Order: Lepidoptera
- Family: Geometridae
- Genus: Eupithecia
- Species: E. egregiata

Binomial name
- Eupithecia egregiata Mironov & Ratzel, 2008

Species of moth

Eupithecia egregiata is a moth in the family Geometridae. It is found in Pakistan and Afghanistan.

The wingspan is about 18–20 mm.
