= Eupithecia haywardi =

Scientific classification
- Domain: Eukaryota
- Kingdom: Animalia
- Phylum: Arthropoda
- Class: Insecta
- Order: Lepidoptera
- Family: Geometridae
- Genus: Eupithecia
- Species: E. haywardi

Binomial name
- Eupithecia haywardi D. S. Fletcher, 1953

Species of moth

Eupithecia haywardi is a moth in the family Geometridae described by David Stephen Fletcher in 1953. It is found in Argentina.
