= Eupithecia semirufescens =

Scientific classification
- Domain: Eukaryota
- Kingdom: Animalia
- Phylum: Arthropoda
- Class: Insecta
- Order: Lepidoptera
- Family: Geometridae
- Genus: Eupithecia
- Species: E. semirufescens

Binomial name
- Eupithecia semirufescens (Warren, 1906)

Synonyms
- Tephroclystia semirufescens Warren, 1906

Species of moth

Eupithecia semirufescens is a moth in the family Geometridae. It is found in Brazil.
