= Eupithecia hilaris =

Scientific classification
- Kingdom: Animalia
- Phylum: Arthropoda
- Clade: Pancrustacea
- Class: Insecta
- Order: Lepidoptera
- Family: Geometridae
- Genus: Eupithecia
- Species: E. hilaris

Binomial name
- Eupithecia hilaris (Prout, 1910)

Synonyms
- Eucymatoge hilaris Prout, 1910

Species of moth

Eupithecia hilaris is a moth in the family Geometridae. It is found in Colombia.
