= Eupithecia firmata =

Scientific classification
- Kingdom: Animalia
- Phylum: Arthropoda
- Clade: Pancrustacea
- Class: Insecta
- Order: Lepidoptera
- Family: Geometridae
- Genus: Eupithecia
- Species: E. firmata

Binomial name
- Eupithecia firmata Mironov & Ratzel, 2008

Species of moth

Eupithecia firmata is a moth in the family Geometridae. It is found in Pakistan and northern India.

The wingspan is about 16–22 mm. The forewings are grey and the hindwings are lighter pale grey.
