= Eupithecia inepta =

Scientific classification
- Kingdom: Animalia
- Phylum: Arthropoda
- Clade: Pancrustacea
- Class: Insecta
- Order: Lepidoptera
- Family: Geometridae
- Genus: Eupithecia
- Species: E. inepta

Binomial name
- Eupithecia inepta Prout, 1922

Synonyms
- Eupithecia ronkayi Vojnits, 1994; Eupithecia werneri Vojnits, 1985

Species of moth

Eupithecia inepta is a moth in the family Geometridae, described by Prout in 1922. It is found on the Juan Fernandez Islands in Chile. The habitat consists of the Northern Valdivian Forest Biotic Province.

The length of the forewings is about 10.5-11.5 mm for females. Adults have been recorded on wing in March.
