= Eupithecia transexpiata =

Scientific classification
- Kingdom: Animalia
- Phylum: Arthropoda
- Class: Insecta
- Order: Lepidoptera
- Family: Geometridae
- Genus: Eupithecia
- Species: E. transexpiata

Binomial name
- Eupithecia transexpiata Rindge, 1987

Species of moth

Eupithecia transexpiata is a moth in the family Geometridae. It is found in the Los Lagos Region (Osomo Province) in Chile. The habitat consists of the Valdivian Forest Biotic Province.

The length of the forewings is about 8.5 mm for males. Adults have been recorded on wing in February.
