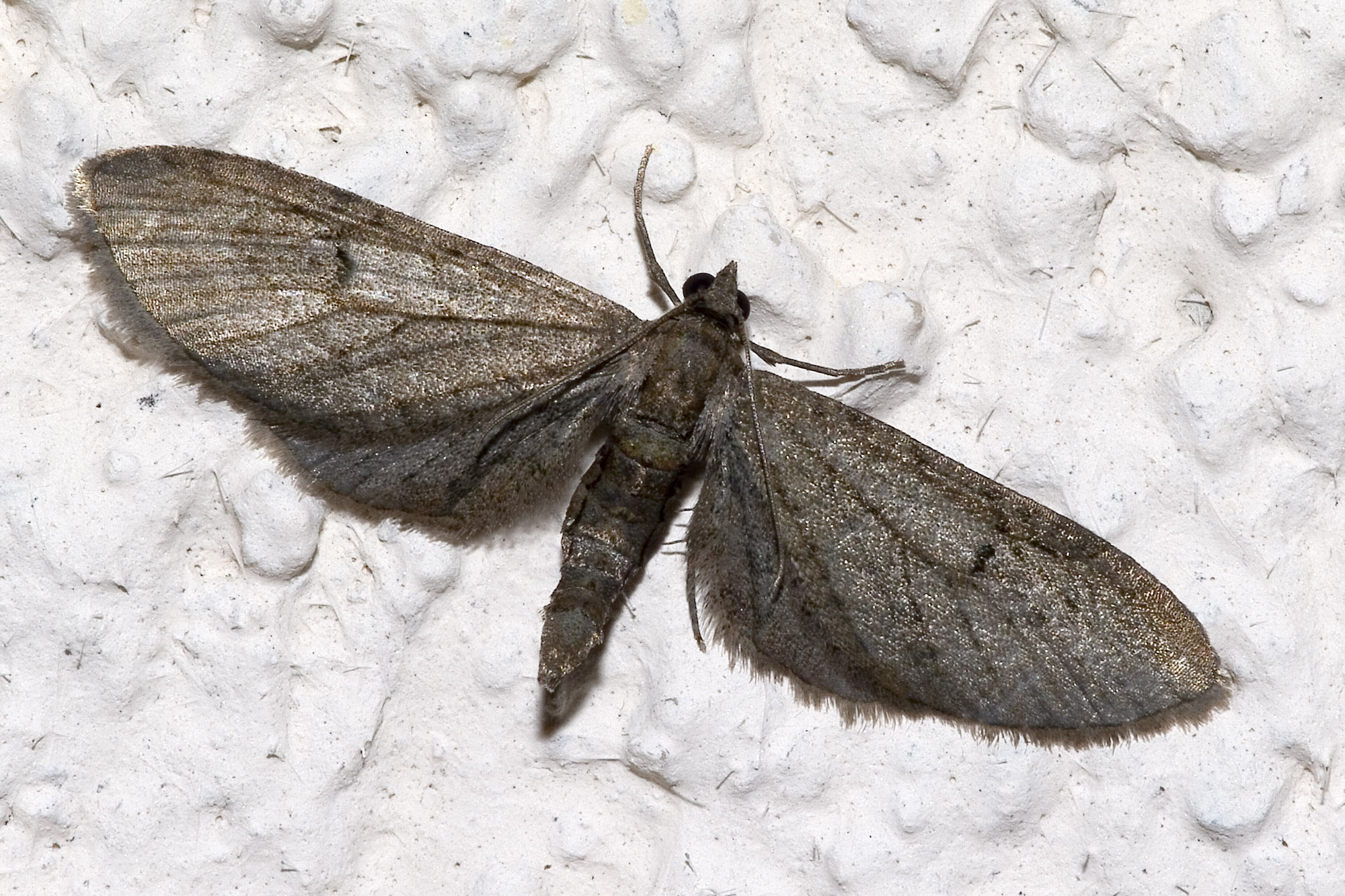
- Eupithecia innotata

Scientific classification
- Kingdom: Animalia
- Phylum: Arthropoda
- Clade: Pancrustacea
- Class: Insecta
- Order: Lepidoptera
- Family: Geometridae
- Subfamily: Larentiinae
- Tribe: Eupitheciini
- Genus: Eupithecia; Curtis, 1825

Synonyms
- Arcyonia Hübner, 1825; Bohatschia Schütze, 1960; Catarina Vojnits & De Laever, 1973; Delaeveria Schütze, 1961; Dietzea Schütze, 1956; Dochephora Warren, 1895; Dolichopyge Warren, 1900; Dyscymatoge Hübner, 1825; Epicaste Gumppenberg, 1887; Eucymatoge Hübner, [1825]; Euphitecia Carnelutti & Michieli, 1958; Eurypeplodes Warren, 1893; Heteropithecia Vojnits, 1985; Hypepirritis Hübner, [1825]; Lamelluncia Mironov, 1990; Lepiodes Guenée, 1858; Leucocora Hübner, 1825; Mnesiloba Warren, 1901; Neopithecia Vojnits, 1985; Pena Walker, 1863; Petersenia Schütze, 1958; Phaulostathma Warren, 1900; Propithecia Vojnits, 1985; Sebastia Warren, 1895 (preocc. Kirby, 1892); Stenopla Warren, 1900; Tarachia Hübner, 1825; Tephroclystia Hübner, 1825; Tephroclystis Meyrick, 1892; Thysanoctena Warren, 1904; Trichoclystis Warren, 1904; Zygmena Boie, 1839

= Eupithecia =

Large genus of geometer moths

Eupithecia is the largest genus of moths of the family Geometridae, and the namesake and type genus of tribe Eupitheciini. Species in the genus are, like those of other genera in the tribe, commonly known as pugs. The genus is highly speciose, with over 1400 species, and members of the genus are present in most of the world with exception of Australasia. Roughly a quarter of described Eupithecia species occur in the Neotropical realm, where they have an especially high species diversity in the montane rain forests of the Andes. The genus includes a few agricultural pest species, such as the currant pug moth, Eupithecia assimilata, which is a pest on hops, and the cloaked pug moth, Eupithecia abietaria, which is a cone pest in spruce seed orchards.

Adult specimens of Eupithecia are typically small, often between 12 and 35 mm, with muted colours, and display a large amount of uniformity between species. As a result, identification of a specimen as part of genus Eupithecia is generally easy, but identifying the exact species is difficult and often reliant on examination of the dissected genitals. Most species share a characteristic resting pose in which the forewings are held flat at a right angle to the body—that is, the costal margins of both forewings form a more-or-less horizontal line—while the hindwings are largely covered by the forewings. They are generally nocturnal.

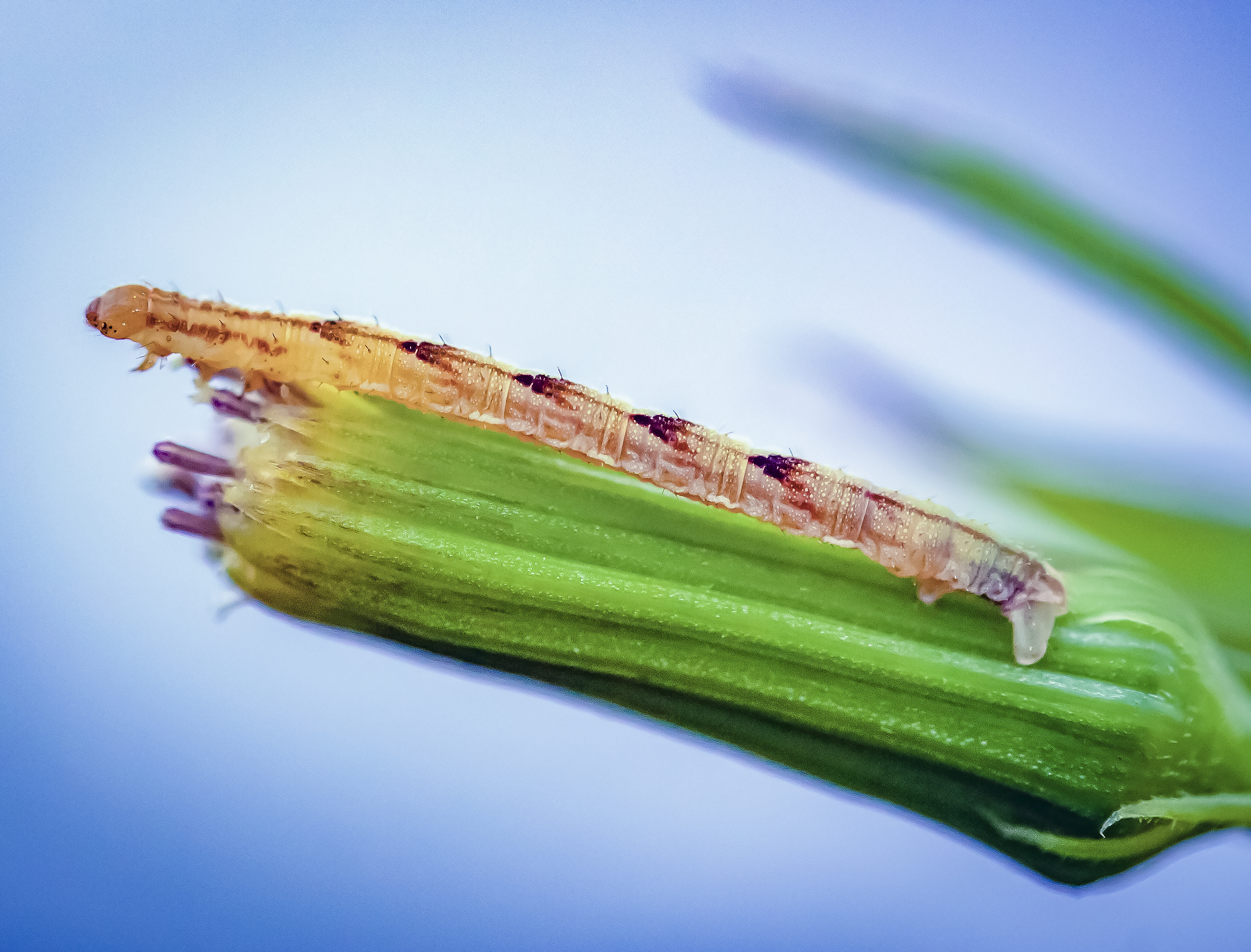
Pug moth caterpillar Eupithecia sp.

Of the species where the larval behaviour is known, most feed from the flowers and seeds of their food plants rather than the foliage. Many species have a very specific food plant. The larvae of all but one of the endemic species of Eupithecia from Hawaii are ambush predators of a wide variety of insects and spiders. These ambush predators have raptorial legs, with which they grab prey that comes into contact with their hind end.

== Species ==
This is a list of all described species.

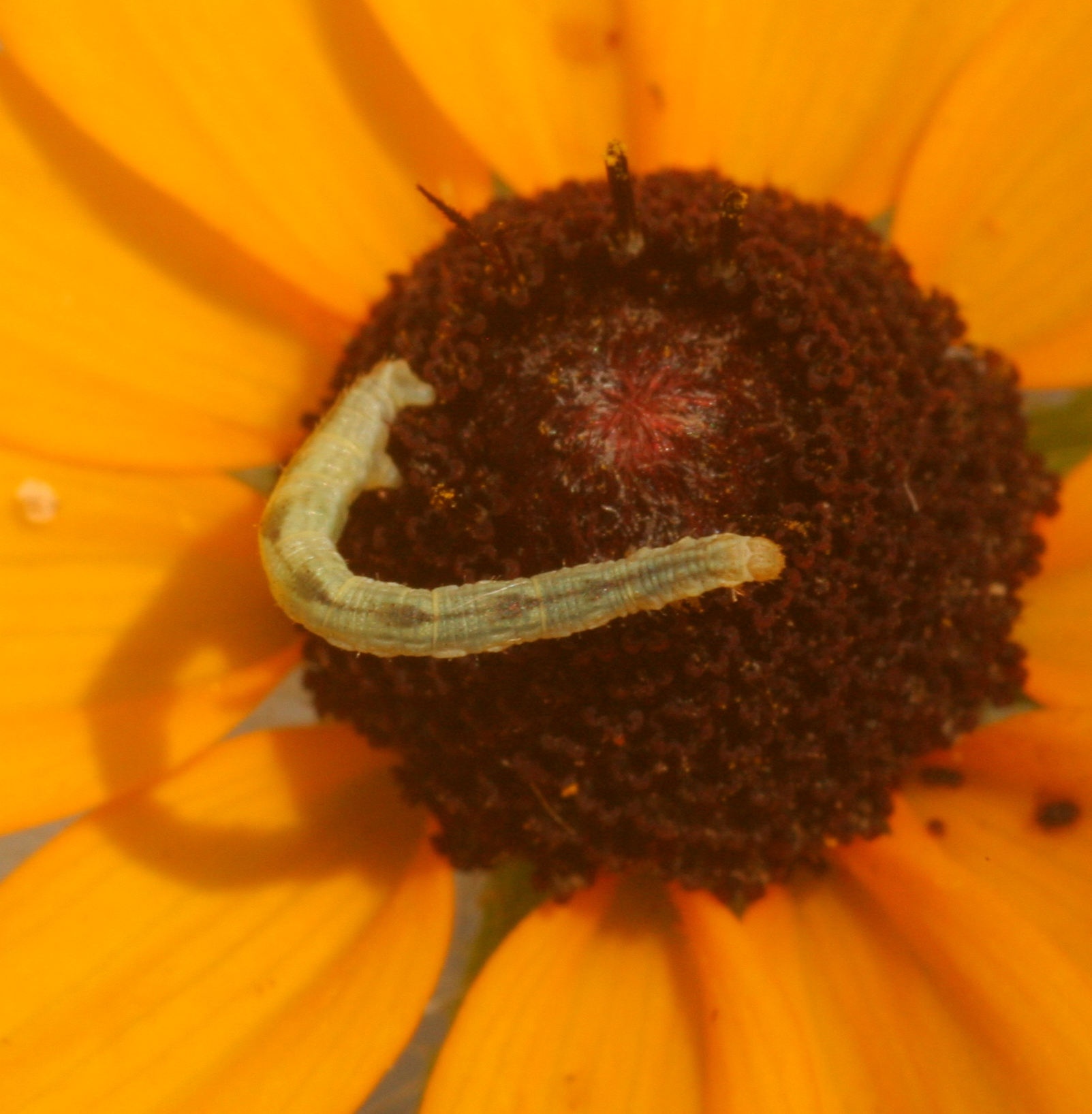
Common pug, Eupithecia miserulata, feeding on Rudbeckia serotina

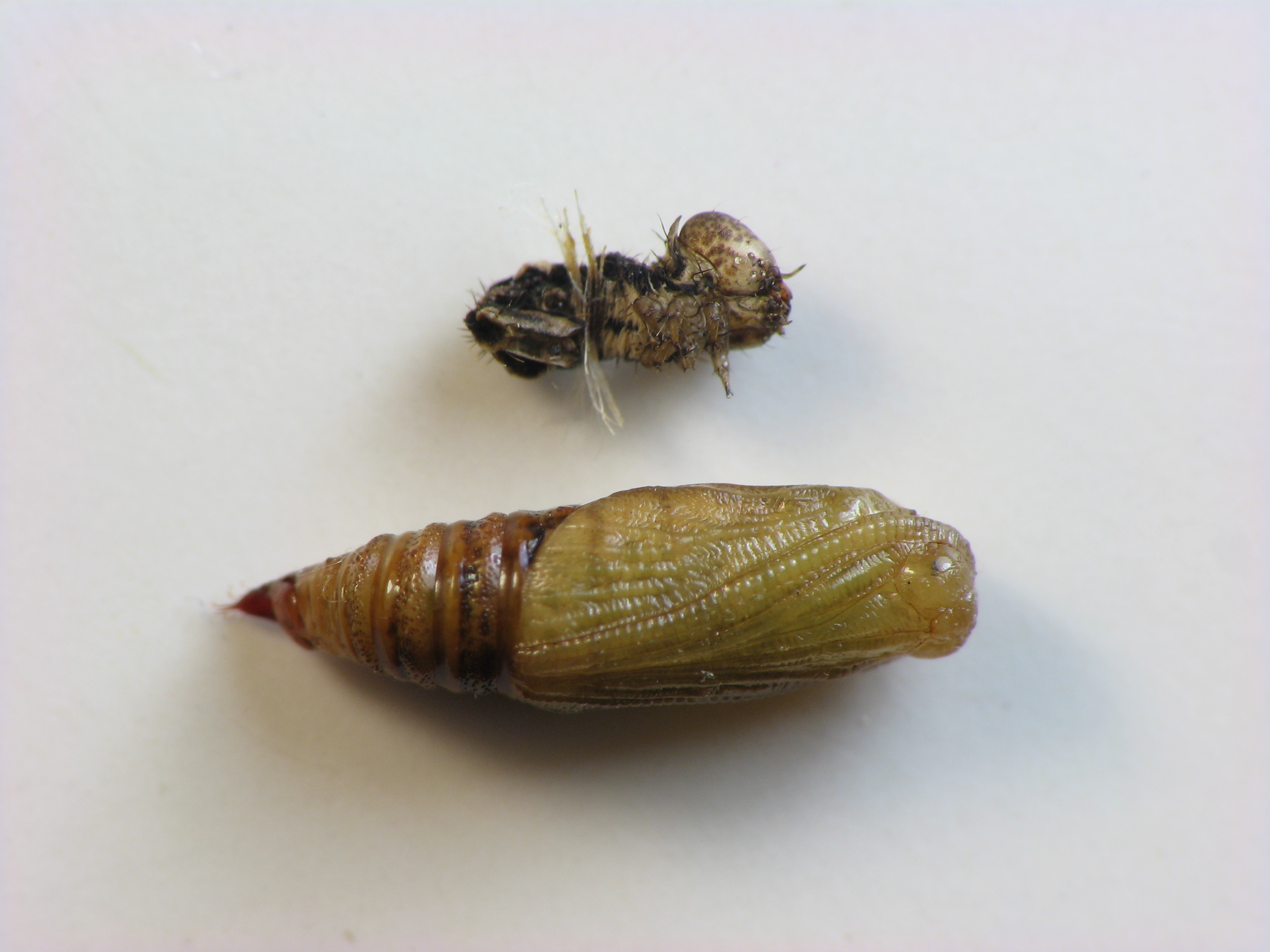
Eupithecia , pupa

=== A ===
- Eupithecia abbreviata
- Eupithecia abdera
- Eupithecia abietaria
- Eupithecia absinthiata
- Eupithecia accurata
- Eupithecia achyrdaghica
- Eupithecia acidalioides
- Eupithecia acolpodes
- Eupithecia acosmos
- Eupithecia acragas
- Eupithecia actaeata
- Eupithecia actrix
- Eupithecia acutangula
- Eupithecia acutipapillata
- Eupithecia acutipennis
- Eupithecia acutula
- Eupithecia acyrtoterma
- Eupithecia addictata
- Eupithecia adelpha
- Eupithecia adequata
- Eupithecia adjemica
- Eupithecia admiranda
- Eupithecia adoranda
- Eupithecia adspersata
- Eupithecia aduncata
- Eupithecia aegyptiaca
- Eupithecia aella
- Eupithecia aenigma
- Eupithecia aequabila
- Eupithecia affinata
- Eupithecia affinitata
- Eupithecia agnesata
- Eupithecia albertiata
- Eupithecia albibaltea
- Eupithecia albibasalis
- Eupithecia albibisecta
- Eupithecia albicapitata
- Eupithecia albicarnea
- Eupithecia albicentralis
- Eupithecia albiceps
- Eupithecia albicristulata
- Eupithecia albidulata
- Eupithecia albifurva
- Eupithecia albifusca
- Eupithecia albigrisata
- Eupithecia albigutta
- Eupithecia albimaculata
- Eupithecia albimedia
- Eupithecia albimixta
- Eupithecia albimontanata
- Eupithecia albirasa
- Eupithecia albirivata
- Eupithecia albisecta
- Eupithecia albispumata
- Eupithecia albistillata
- Eupithecia albistrigata
- Eupithecia albofasciata
- Eupithecia albursi
- Eupithecia albuta
- Eupithecia alexiae
- Eupithecia aliena
- Eupithecia alishana
- Eupithecia alliaria
- Eupithecia alogista
- Eupithecia alpinata
- Eupithecia alticomora
- Eupithecia altitudinis
- Eupithecia amandae
- Eupithecia amasina
- Eupithecia amathes
- Eupithecia amicula
- Eupithecia ammonata
- Eupithecia ammorrhoa
- Eupithecia amphiplex
- Eupithecia amplexata
- Eupithecia amurensis
- Eupithecia anactoria
- Eupithecia analiscripta
- Eupithecia analoga
- Eupithecia anamnesa
- Eupithecia anasticta
- Eupithecia ancillata
- Eupithecia andrasi
- Eupithecia anemica
- Eupithecia anguinata
- Eupithecia angulata
- Eupithecia angustiarum
- Eupithecia anickae
- Eupithecia anikini
- Eupithecia anita
- Eupithecia annulata
- Eupithecia antalica
- Eupithecia antaria
- Eupithecia anticaria
- Eupithecia anticura
- Eupithecia antigraphata
- Eupithecia antiqua
- Eupithecia antivulgaria
- Eupithecia aphanes
- Eupithecia apicistrigata
- Eupithecia apparatissima
- Eupithecia appendiculata
- Eupithecia apta
- Eupithecia aradjouna
- Eupithecia arauco
- Eupithecia arenaria
- Eupithecia arenbergeri
- Eupithecia arenitincta
- Eupithecia arenosa
- Eupithecia arenosissima
- Eupithecia argentea
- Eupithecia aritai
- Eupithecia armeniaca
- Eupithecia asema
- Eupithecia asempiterna
- Eupithecia asperata
- Eupithecia assectata
- Eupithecia assimilata
- Eupithecia assimilis
- Eupithecia assulata
- Eupithecia astales
- Eupithecia asteria
- Eupithecia astricta
- Eupithecia atacama
- Eupithecia atacamaensis
- Eupithecia atomaria
- Eupithecia atricollaris
- Eupithecia atrisignis
- Eupithecia atromaculata
- Eupithecia attali
- Eupithecia atuni
- Eupithecia avara
- Eupithecia aysenae

=== B ===
- Eupithecia balintzsolti
- Eupithecia balteata
- Eupithecia bandurriasae
- Eupithecia bardiaria
- Eupithecia barteli
- Eupithecia bastelbergeri
- Eupithecia basurmanca
- Eupithecia batangi
- Eupithecia batida
- Eupithecia behrensata
- Eupithecia bella
- Eupithecia bellimargo
- Eupithecia bestia
- Eupithecia bialbata
- Eupithecia bicubitata
- Eupithecia bicurvicera
- Eupithecia biedermanata
- Eupithecia bifasciata
- Eupithecia biornata
- Eupithecia biumbrata
- Eupithecia biviridata
- Eupithecia bivittata
- Eupithecia blandula
- Eupithecia blenna
- Eupithecia bohatschi
- Eupithecia bolespora
- Eupithecia bolterii
- Eupithecia boneta
- Eupithecia borealis
- Eupithecia boryata
- Eupithecia bowmani
- Eupithecia brachyptera
- Eupithecia brandti
- Eupithecia brevicula
- Eupithecia breviculata
- Eupithecia brevifasciaria
- Eupithecia briseis
- Eupithecia broteas
- Eupithecia broui
- Eupithecia brunneata
- Eupithecia brunneilutea
- Eupithecia brunneodorsata
- Eupithecia brunneomarginata
- Eupithecia bryanti
- Eupithecia bullata
- Eupithecia burmata
- Eupithecia burselongata
- Eupithecia butvilai
- Eupithecia buysseata

=== C ===
- Eupithecia cabrasae
- Eupithecia cabreria
- Eupithecia caburgua
- Eupithecia cachina
- Eupithecia caduca
- Eupithecia caementariata
- Eupithecia calderae
- Eupithecia calientes
- Eupithecia caliginea
- Eupithecia caliginosa
- Eupithecia calligraphata
- Eupithecia camilla
- Eupithecia cana
- Eupithecia canchasae
- Eupithecia candicans
- Eupithecia candidata
- Eupithecia canisparsa
- Eupithecia canonica
- Eupithecia capitata
- Eupithecia carneata
- Eupithecia carpophagata
- Eupithecia carpophilata
- Eupithecia carribeana
- Eupithecia casloata
- Eupithecia casmena
- Eupithecia casta
- Eupithecia castellata
- Eupithecia catalinata
- Eupithecia cauchiata
- Eupithecia cautin
- Eupithecia cazieri
- Eupithecia celatisigna
- Eupithecia centaureata
- Eupithecia cercina
- Eupithecia cerussaria
- Eupithecia cervina
- Eupithecia cerynea
- Eupithecia cestata
- Eupithecia cestatoides
- Eupithecia chalikophila
- Eupithecia chapo
- Eupithecia cheituna
- Eupithecia chesiata
- Eupithecia chilensis
- Eupithecia chimera
- Eupithecia chincha
- Eupithecia chingana
- Eupithecia chiricahuata
- Eupithecia chlorofasciata
- Eupithecia chlorophora
- Eupithecia christophi
- Eupithecia chrodna
- Eupithecia chui
- Eupithecia cichisa
- Eupithecia cimicifugata
- Eupithecia cingulata
- Eupithecia cinnamomata
- Eupithecia citraria
- Eupithecia classicata
- Eupithecia claudei
- Eupithecia clavifera
- Eupithecia coaequalis
- Eupithecia cocciferata
- Eupithecia coccinea
- Eupithecia cocoata
- Eupithecia coetulata
- Eupithecia cognizata
- Eupithecia cohabitans
- Eupithecia cohorticula
- Eupithecia collineata
- Eupithecia coloradensis
- Eupithecia columbiata
- Eupithecia comes
- Eupithecia concava
- Eupithecia concepcion
- Eupithecia concinna
- Eupithecia concremata
- Eupithecia concostivexa
- Eupithecia conquesta
- Eupithecia conduplicata
- Eupithecia coniurata
- Eupithecia conjunctiva
- Eupithecia connexa
- Eupithecia consors
- Eupithecia consortaria
- Eupithecia conterminata
- Eupithecia contexta
- Eupithecia contraria
- Eupithecia convallata
- Eupithecia convexa
- Eupithecia conviva
- Eupithecia cooptata
- Eupithecia copaquillaensis
- Eupithecia coquimbo
- Eupithecia cordata
- Eupithecia coribalteata
- Eupithecia corralensis
- Eupithecia correana
- Eupithecia corroborata
- Eupithecia corticata
- Eupithecia costalis
- Eupithecia costiconvexa
- Eupithecia costimacularia
- Eupithecia costipicta
- Eupithecia costirufaria
- Eupithecia costivallata
- Eupithecia cotidiana
- Eupithecia craterias
- Eupithecia crenata
- Eupithecia cretaceata
- Eupithecia cretata
- Eupithecia cretosa
- Eupithecia cuculliaria
- Eupithecia cugiai
- Eupithecia cuneata
- Eupithecia cuneilineata
- Eupithecia cunina
- Eupithecia cuprearia
- Eupithecia cupreata
- Eupithecia cupressata
- Eupithecia curacautinae
- Eupithecia curvifascia

=== D ===
- Eupithecia daemionata
- Eupithecia dalhousiensis
- Eupithecia damnosa
- Eupithecia dargei
- Eupithecia dayensis
- Eupithecia dealbata
- Eupithecia dearmata
- Eupithecia dechkanata
- Eupithecia decipiens
- Eupithecia decorata
- Eupithecia decrepita
- Eupithecia decussata
- Eupithecia defimbriata
- Eupithecia deformis
- Eupithecia delicata
- Eupithecia delozona
- Eupithecia demetata
- Eupithecia demissa
- Eupithecia denotata
- Eupithecia densicauda
- Eupithecia denticulata
- Eupithecia dentosa
- Eupithecia depasta
- Eupithecia derogata
- Eupithecia descimoni
- Eupithecia despectaria
- Eupithecia detritata
- Eupithecia deverrata
- Eupithecia devestita
- Eupithecia devia
- Eupithecia dichroma
- Eupithecia dierli
- Eupithecia dilucida
- Eupithecia dimidia
- Eupithecia dinshoensis
- Eupithecia discipuncta
- Eupithecia discolor
- Eupithecia discordans
- Eupithecia discretata
- Eupithecia disformata
- Eupithecia dissertata
- Eupithecia dissobapta
- Eupithecia dissonans
- Eupithecia dissors
- Eupithecia distinctaria
- Eupithecia divertenta
- Eupithecia djakonovi
- Eupithecia dodoneata
- Eupithecia dohertyi
- Eupithecia dolia
- Eupithecia dolosa
- Eupithecia dominaria
- Eupithecia dormita
- Eupithecia drastica
- Eupithecia druentiata
- Eupithecia dryinombra
- Eupithecia dubiosa
- Eupithecia duena
- Eupithecia duplex
- Eupithecia dura
- Eupithecia dustica
- Eupithecia dzhirgatalensis

=== E ===
- Eupithecia ebriosa
- Eupithecia ecplyta
- Eupithecia edaphopteryx
- Eupithecia edna
- Eupithecia eduardi
- Eupithecia edwardsi
- Eupithecia efferata
- Eupithecia egena
- Eupithecia egenaria
- Eupithecia egregiata
- Eupithecia elbursi
- Eupithecia elbursiata
- Eupithecia elbuta
- Eupithecia electreofasciata
- Eupithecia elimata
- Eupithecia elissa
- Eupithecia elquiensis
- Eupithecia emanata
- Eupithecia emendata
- Eupithecia emittens
- Eupithecia emporias
- Eupithecia encoensis
- Eupithecia endonephelia
- Eupithecia endotherma
- Eupithecia ensifera
- Eupithecia erecticoma
- Eupithecia erectinota
- Eupithecia eremiata
- Eupithecia ericeata
- Eupithecia ericeti
- Eupithecia eszterkae
- Eupithecia eupompa
- Eupithecia eurytera
- Eupithecia evacuata
- Eupithecia evansi
- Eupithecia exacerbata
- Eupithecia exactata
- Eupithecia exheres
- Eupithecia exicterata
- Eupithecia exiguata
- Eupithecia eximia
- Eupithecia exophychra
- Eupithecia expallidata
- Eupithecia exquisita
- Eupithecia exrubicunda
- Eupithecia extensaria
- Eupithecia extinctata
- Eupithecia extraversaria
- Eupithecia extremata
- Eupithecia extrinseca
- Eupithecia exudata

=== F ===
- Eupithecia falkenbergi
- Eupithecia falkneri
- Eupithecia famularia
- Eupithecia fastuosa
- Eupithecia fatigata
- Eupithecia fausta
- Eupithecia feliscaudata
- Eupithecia fenita
- Eupithecia fennoscandica
- Eupithecia fericlava
- Eupithecia fernandi
- Eupithecia fervida
- Eupithecia fessa
- Eupithecia fibigeri
- Eupithecia filia
- Eupithecia finitima
- Eupithecia fioriata
- Eupithecia firmata
- Eupithecia flavigutta
- Eupithecia flavimacula
- Eupithecia flavoapicaria
- Eupithecia fletcherata
- Eupithecia fletcheri
- Eupithecia flexicornuta
- Eupithecia florianii
- Eupithecia formosa
- Eupithecia forsterata
- Eupithecia fortis
- Eupithecia fossaria
- Eupithecia fosteri
- Eupithecia fredericki
- Eupithecia fredi
- Eupithecia frequens
- Eupithecia frontosa
- Eupithecia fulgurata
- Eupithecia fuliginata
- Eupithecia fulvidorsata
- Eupithecia fulvipennis
- Eupithecia fulviplagiata
- Eupithecia fulvistriga
- Eupithecia fumifascia
- Eupithecia fumimixta
- Eupithecia funerea
- Eupithecia furcata
- Eupithecia furvipennis
- Eupithecia fusca
- Eupithecia fuscata
- Eupithecia fuscicostata
- Eupithecia fuscopunctata
- Eupithecia fuscorufa

=== G ===
- Eupithecia galapagosata
- Eupithecia galepsa
- Eupithecia galsworthyi
- Eupithecia garrula
- Eupithecia garuda
- Eupithecia gaumaria
- Eupithecia gelbrechti
- Eupithecia gelidata
- Eupithecia gemellata
- Eupithecia gigantea
- Eupithecia gilata
- Eupithecia gilvipennata
- Eupithecia glaisi
- Eupithecia glaucotincta
- Eupithecia gluptata
- Eupithecia gomerensis
- Eupithecia goslina
- Eupithecia graciliata
- Eupithecia gradatilinea
- Eupithecia graefi
- Eupithecia granata
- Eupithecia graphata
- Eupithecia graphiticata
- Eupithecia grappleri
- Eupithecia gratiosata
- Eupithecia griveaudi
- Eupithecia groenblomi
- Eupithecia guamanica
- Eupithecia guayacanae
- Eupithecia gueneata
- Eupithecia gypsophilata

=== H ===
- Eupithecia habermani
- Eupithecia hainanensis
- Eupithecia halosydne
- Eupithecia hamleti
- Eupithecia hannemanni
- Eupithecia harenosa
- Eupithecia harrisonata
- Eupithecia hashimotoi
- Eupithecia hastaria
- Eupithecia haworthiata
- Eupithecia haywardi
- Eupithecia hebes
- Eupithecia helena
- Eupithecia helenaria
- Eupithecia hemileuca
- Eupithecia hemileucaria
- Eupithecia hemiochra
- Eupithecia herczigi
- Eupithecia herefordaria
- Eupithecia hesperina
- Eupithecia higa
- Eupithecia hilacha
- Eupithecia hilariata
- Eupithecia hilaris
- Eupithecia himalayata
- Eupithecia hippolyte
- Eupithecia hodeberti
- Eupithecia hoenehermanni
- Eupithecia hoenei
- Eupithecia hohokamae
- Eupithecia hollowayi
- Eupithecia holti
- Eupithecia hombrilla
- Eupithecia homogrammata
- Eupithecia honesta
- Eupithecia hongxiangae
- Eupithecia horismoides
- Eupithecia hormiga
- Eupithecia horrida
- Eupithecia hreblayi
- Eupithecia huachuca
- Eupithecia hundamoi
- Eupithecia husseini
- Eupithecia hydrargyrea
- Eupithecia hypophasma
- Eupithecia hysterica

=== I ===
- Eupithecia icterata
- Eupithecia idaeoides
- Eupithecia idalia
- Eupithecia illaborata
- Eupithecia illepidus
- Eupithecia immensa
- Eupithecia immodica
- Eupithecia immundata
- Eupithecia impavida
- Eupithecia implorata
- Eupithecia impolita
- Eupithecia importuna
- Eupithecia improba
- Eupithecia improvisa
- Eupithecia impurata
- Eupithecia ina
- Eupithecia inassignata
- Eupithecia incohata
- Eupithecia incommoda
- Eupithecia inconclusaria
- Eupithecia inconspicuata
- Eupithecia incorrupta
- Eupithecia incurvaria
- Eupithecia indecisa
- Eupithecia indecora
- Eupithecia indefinata
- Eupithecia indigata
- Eupithecia indissolubilis
- Eupithecia indistincta
- Eupithecia inepta
- Eupithecia inexercita
- Eupithecia inexhausta
- Eupithecia inexpiata
- Eupithecia inexplicabilis
- Eupithecia infausta
- Eupithecia infecta
- Eupithecia infectaria
- Eupithecia infecunda
- Eupithecia infelix
- Eupithecia infensa
- Eupithecia infestata
- Eupithecia infimbriata
- Eupithecia infortunata
- Eupithecia innotata
- Eupithecia inopinata
- Eupithecia inoueata
- Eupithecia inquinata
- Eupithecia insana
- Eupithecia inscitata
- Eupithecia insigniata
- Eupithecia insignifica
- Eupithecia insolabilis
- Eupithecia insolita
- Eupithecia interpunctaria
- Eupithecia interrubescens
- Eupithecia interrubrescens
- Eupithecia intolerabilis
- Eupithecia intricata
- Eupithecia inturbata
- Eupithecia inveterata
- Eupithecia invicta
- Eupithecia iphiona
- Eupithecia irambata
- Eupithecia irenica
- Eupithecia irreperta
- Eupithecia irriguata
- Eupithecia isabellina
- Eupithecia isopsaliodes
- Eupithecia isopsaloides
- Eupithecia isotenes
- Eupithecia iterata

=== J-K ===
- Eupithecia jacksoni
- Eupithecia jamesi
- Eupithecia jeanneli
- Eupithecia jefrenata
- Eupithecia jejunata
- Eupithecia jermyi
- Eupithecia jezonica
- Eupithecia jinboi
- Eupithecia jizlensis
- Eupithecia joanata
- Eupithecia johnstoni
- Eupithecia jorge
- Eupithecia josefina
- Eupithecia julia
- Eupithecia juncalensis
- Eupithecia junctifascia
- Eupithecia juntasae
- Eupithecia kama
- Eupithecia kamburonga
- Eupithecia karadaghensis
- Eupithecia karakasykensis
- Eupithecia karapinensis
- Eupithecia karenae
- Eupithecia karischi
- Eupithecia karli
- Eupithecia karnaliensis
- Eupithecia keredjana
- Eupithecia khama
- Eupithecia kibatiata
- Eupithecia kinga
- Eupithecia kobayashii
- Eupithecia kondarana
- Eupithecia konradi
- Eupithecia kopetdaghica
- Eupithecia kostjuki
- Eupithecia kozhantschikovi
- Eupithecia kozlovi
- Eupithecia krampli
- Eupithecia kruusi
- Eupithecia kudoi
- Eupithecia kuldschaensis
- Eupithecia kuni
- Eupithecia kurilensis
- Eupithecia kuroshio
- Eupithecia kurtia

=== L ===
- Eupithecia lachaumei
- Eupithecia lachrymosa
- Eupithecia lacteolata
- Eupithecia lactevirens
- Eupithecia lactibasis
- Eupithecia lafontaineata
- Eupithecia lamata
- Eupithecia lanceata
- Eupithecia landryi
- Eupithecia laoica
- Eupithecia laquaearia
- Eupithecia larentimima
- Eupithecia lariciata
- Eupithecia lasciva
- Eupithecia laszloi
- Eupithecia lata
- Eupithecia laterata
- Eupithecia laticallis
- Eupithecia latifurcata
- Eupithecia latimedia
- Eupithecia latipennata
- Eupithecia latitans
- Eupithecia laudabilis
- Eupithecia laudenda
- Eupithecia leamariae
- Eupithecia lecerfiata
- Eupithecia lechriotorna
- Eupithecia leleupi
- Eupithecia lentiscata
- Eupithecia leptogrammata
- Eupithecia leucenthesis
- Eupithecia leucographata
- Eupithecia leucoprora
- Eupithecia leucospila
- Eupithecia leucostaxis
- Eupithecia levata
- Eupithecia liberata
- Eupithecia licita
- Eupithecia liguriata
- Eupithecia likiangi
- Eupithecia lilliputata
- Eupithecia limbata
- Eupithecia linariata
- Eupithecia linda
- Eupithecia lindti
- Eupithecia lineisdistincta
- Eupithecia lineosa
- Eupithecia lini
- Eupithecia liqalaneng
- Eupithecia lissopis
- Eupithecia lithographata
- Eupithecia litoris
- Eupithecia lobbichlerata
- Eupithecia longibasalis
- Eupithecia longidens
- Eupithecia longifimbria
- Eupithecia longipalpata
- Eupithecia longipennata
- Eupithecia lucigera
- Eupithecia luctuosa
- Eupithecia ludificata
- Eupithecia lugubris
- Eupithecia lunata
- Eupithecia lunatica
- Eupithecia lupa
- Eupithecia lusoria
- Eupithecia luteonigra
- Eupithecia lvovskyi

=== M ===
- Eupithecia macdunnoughi
- Eupithecia macfarlandi
- Eupithecia macreus
- Eupithecia macrocarpata
- Eupithecia macrodisca
- Eupithecia maculosa
- Eupithecia madura
- Eupithecia maenamiella
- Eupithecia maerkerata
- Eupithecia maestosa
- Eupithecia magica
- Eupithecia magnifacta
- Eupithecia magnipuncta
- Eupithecia mahomedana
- Eupithecia malchoensis
- Eupithecia maleformata
- Eupithecia mallecoensis
- Eupithecia maloti
- Eupithecia mandschurica
- Eupithecia manifesta
- Eupithecia marasa
- Eupithecia marginata
- Eupithecia marmaricata
- Eupithecia marmorea
- Eupithecia marnoti
- Eupithecia marpessa
- Eupithecia masculina
- Eupithecia maspalomae
- Eupithecia massiliata
- Eupithecia matheri
- Eupithecia matrona
- Eupithecia matura
- Eupithecia maule
- Eupithecia mauvaria
- Eupithecia meandrata
- Eupithecia mecodaedala
- Eupithecia mediargentata
- Eupithecia mediata
- Eupithecia medilunata
- Eupithecia mediobrunnea
- Eupithecia mediocincta
- Eupithecia megaproterva
- Eupithecia mejala
- Eupithecia mekrana
- Eupithecia melanograpta
- Eupithecia memorata
- Eupithecia mendosaria
- Eupithecia mentavoni
- Eupithecia mentita
- Eupithecia meridiana
- Eupithecia mesodeicta
- Eupithecia mesogrammata
- Eupithecia microleuca
- Eupithecia microptilota
- Eupithecia millefoliata
- Eupithecia millesima
- Eupithecia mima
- Eupithecia minimaria
- Eupithecia minucia
- Eupithecia minusculata
- Eupithecia minutula
- Eupithecia mira
- Eupithecia mirei
- Eupithecia mirificata
- Eupithecia miserulata
- Eupithecia missionerata
- Eupithecia misturata
- Eupithecia mitigata
- Eupithecia moecha
- Eupithecia molestissima
- Eupithecia molliaria
- Eupithecia mollita
- Eupithecia molybdaena
- Eupithecia monacheata
- Eupithecia montana
- Eupithecia montanata
- Eupithecia montavoni
- Eupithecia monticola
- Eupithecia monticolans
- Eupithecia moricandiata
- Eupithecia morosa
- Eupithecia mortua
- Eupithecia multiplex
- Eupithecia multiscripta
- Eupithecia multispinata
- Eupithecia multistrigata
- Eupithecia mundiscripta
- Eupithecia munguata
- Eupithecia muralla
- Eupithecia muscistrigata
- Eupithecia muscula
- Eupithecia mustangata
- Eupithecia mutata
- Eupithecia myoma
- Eupithecia mystiata
- Eupithecia mystica

=== N ===
- Eupithecia nabagulensis
- Eupithecia nabokovi
- Eupithecia nachadira
- Eupithecia nadiae
- Eupithecia nagaii
- Eupithecia nahuelbuta
- Eupithecia nanata
- Eupithecia natalica
- Eupithecia naumanni
- Eupithecia necessaria
- Eupithecia nemoralis
- Eupithecia nemrutica
- Eupithecia neomexicana
- Eupithecia neosatyrata
- Eupithecia nepalata
- Eupithecia nephelata
- Eupithecia nervosa
- Eupithecia nesciaria
- Eupithecia nevadata
- Eupithecia nigrataenia
- Eupithecia nigribasis
- Eupithecia nigrilinea
- Eupithecia nigrinotata
- Eupithecia nigripennis
- Eupithecia nigristriata
- Eupithecia nigritaria
- Eupithecia nigrithorax
- Eupithecia nigrodiscata
- Eupithecia nigropolata
- Eupithecia nimbicolor
- Eupithecia nimbosa
- Eupithecia niphadophilata
- Eupithecia niphonaria
- Eupithecia niphoreas
- Eupithecia nirvana
- Eupithecia nishizawai
- Eupithecia niticallis
- Eupithecia niveata
- Eupithecia niveifascia
- Eupithecia niveivena
- Eupithecia nobilitata
- Eupithecia nodosa
- Eupithecia nonanticaria
- Eupithecia noncoacta
- Eupithecia nonferenda
- Eupithecia nonpurgata
- Eupithecia norquinco
- Eupithecia novata
- Eupithecia noxia
- Eupithecia nubilaria
- Eupithecia nublae
- Eupithecia nuceistrigata
- Eupithecia nusret

=== O ===
- Eupithecia obliquiplaga
- Eupithecia oblongipennis
- Eupithecia obscurata
- Eupithecia obtinens
- Eupithecia ochracea
- Eupithecia ochralba
- Eupithecia ochrata
- Eupithecia ochridata
- Eupithecia ochroriguata
- Eupithecia ochrosoma
- Eupithecia ochrovittata
- Eupithecia oculata
- Eupithecia oenone
- Eupithecia ogilviata
- Eupithecia okadai
- Eupithecia olgae
- Eupithecia olivacea
- Eupithecia olivaria
- Eupithecia olivocostata
- Eupithecia omissa
- Eupithecia omnigera
- Eupithecia omniparens
- Eupithecia opicata
- Eupithecia opistographata
- Eupithecia oppidana
- Eupithecia orana
- Eupithecia orba
- Eupithecia orbaria
- Eupithecia orichloris
- Eupithecia ornata
- Eupithecia ornea
- Eupithecia oroba
- Eupithecia orphnata
- Eupithecia orsetilla
- Eupithecia osornoensis
- Eupithecia otiosa
- Eupithecia ovalle
- Eupithecia owenata
- Eupithecia oxycedrata

=== P ===
- Eupithecia pactia
- Eupithecia pallidicosta
- Eupithecia pallidistriga
- Eupithecia palmata
- Eupithecia palpata
- Eupithecia pamirica
- Eupithecia panacea
- Eupithecia panda
- Eupithecia pannosa
- Eupithecia pantellata
- Eupithecia parallaxis
- Eupithecia parallelaria
- Eupithecia parcirufa
- Eupithecia particeps
- Eupithecia paryphata
- Eupithecia pauliani
- Eupithecia paupera
- Eupithecia pauxillaria
- Eupithecia peckorum
- Eupithecia pediba
- Eupithecia peguensis
- Eupithecia pekingiana
- Eupithecia pellicata
- Eupithecia penablanca
- Eupithecia penicilla
- Eupithecia perciliata
- Eupithecia perculsaria
- Eupithecia percuriosa
- Eupithecia peregovitsi
- Eupithecia peregrina
- Eupithecia perendina
- Eupithecia perfica
- Eupithecia perfusca
- Eupithecia perigraphata
- Eupithecia perigrapta
- Eupithecia pernotata
- Eupithecia perolivata
- Eupithecia perpetua
- Eupithecia perryvriesi
- Eupithecia persidis
- Eupithecia persimulata
- Eupithecia personata
- Eupithecia persuastrix
- Eupithecia pertacta
- Eupithecia pertusata
- Eupithecia petersi
- Eupithecia petrohue
- Eupithecia pettyi
- Eupithecia pettyioides
- Eupithecia pfeifferata
- Eupithecia phaea
- Eupithecia phaeocausta
- Eupithecia phaiosata
- Eupithecia phantastica
- Eupithecia philippis
- Eupithecia phoebe
- Eupithecia phoeniceata
- Eupithecia phulchokiana
- Eupithecia phyllisae
- Eupithecia physocleora
- Eupithecia picada
- Eupithecia piccata
- Eupithecia pictimargo
- Eupithecia picturata
- Eupithecia pieria
- Eupithecia pilosa
- Eupithecia pimpinellata
- Eupithecia pinata
- Eupithecia pindosata
- Eupithecia pinkeri
- Eupithecia pippa
- Eupithecia pippoides
- Eupithecia placens
- Eupithecia placida
- Eupithecia placidata
- Eupithecia planipennis
- Eupithecia planiscripta
- Eupithecia platymesa
- Eupithecia plumasata
- Eupithecia plumbeolata
- Eupithecia pluripunctaria
- Eupithecia poecilata
- Eupithecia pollens
- Eupithecia polylibades
- Eupithecia ponderata
- Eupithecia praealta
- Eupithecia praecipitata
- Eupithecia praepupillata
- Eupithecia praesignata
- Eupithecia prasinombra
- Eupithecia pretansata
- Eupithecia pretoriana
- Eupithecia primitiva
- Eupithecia problematicata
- Eupithecia procerissima
- Eupithecia prochazkai
- Eupithecia proflua
- Eupithecia profuga
- Eupithecia proinsigniata
- Eupithecia propagata
- Eupithecia proprivata
- Eupithecia prostrata
- Eupithecia proterva
- Eupithecia prouti
- Eupithecia pseudassimilata
- Eupithecia pseudexheres
- Eupithecia pseudoabbreviata
- Eupithecia pseudoicterata
- Eupithecia pseudosatyrata
- Eupithecia pseudotsugata
- Eupithecia psiadiata
- Eupithecia ptychospila
- Eupithecia pucatrihue
- Eupithecia pucon
- Eupithecia puella
- Eupithecia puengeleri
- Eupithecia pulchellata
- Eupithecia pulgata
- Eupithecia pupila
- Eupithecia purpureoviridis
- Eupithecia purpurissata
- Eupithecia pusillata
- Eupithecia pygmaeata
- Eupithecia pyreneata
- Eupithecia pyricoetes

=== Q-R ===
- Eupithecia qinlingata
- Eupithecia quadripunctata
- Eupithecia quakerata
- Eupithecia quercetica
- Eupithecia rajata
- Eupithecia raniata
- Eupithecia ratoncilla
- Eupithecia rauca
- Eupithecia ravocostaliata
- Eupithecia rebeli
- Eupithecia recens
- Eupithecia recintoensis
- Eupithecia rectilinea
- Eupithecia redingtonia
- Eupithecia rediviva
- Eupithecia refertissima
- Eupithecia regina
- Eupithecia reginamontium
- Eupithecia regulella
- Eupithecia regulosa
- Eupithecia reisserata
- Eupithecia relativa
- Eupithecia relaxata
- Eupithecia relictata
- Eupithecia remissata
- Eupithecia remmi
- Eupithecia repentina
- Eupithecia repetita
- Eupithecia resarta
- Eupithecia retusa
- Eupithecia rhadine
- Eupithecia rhodopyra
- Eupithecia rhoisata
- Eupithecia rhombipennis
- Eupithecia ridiculata
- Eupithecia rigouti
- Eupithecia rindgei
- Eupithecia riparia
- Eupithecia robiginascens
- Eupithecia robinsoni
- Eupithecia ronkayi
- Eupithecia rosai
- Eupithecia rosalia
- Eupithecia rosmarinata
- Eupithecia rotundopuncta
- Eupithecia rougeoti
- Eupithecia rubellata
- Eupithecia rubellicincta
- Eupithecia rubeni
- Eupithecia rubigata
- Eupithecia rubiginifera
- Eupithecia rubridorsata
- Eupithecia rubristigma
- Eupithecia rufa
- Eupithecia rufescens
- Eupithecia ruficorpus
- Eupithecia rufipalpata
- Eupithecia rufivenata
- Eupithecia rulena
- Eupithecia rusicadaria
- Eupithecia russeliata
- Eupithecia russeola
- Eupithecia russula
- Eupithecia ryukyuensis

=== S ===
- Eupithecia sabulosata
- Eupithecia sachalini
- Eupithecia sacrimontis
- Eupithecia sacrivicae
- Eupithecia sacrosancta
- Eupithecia sagittata
- Eupithecia saisanaria
- Eupithecia saldaitisi
- Eupithecia salti
- Eupithecia salubris
- Eupithecia santolinata
- Eupithecia saphenes
- Eupithecia sardoa
- Eupithecia satyrata
- Eupithecia scabrogata
- Eupithecia scalptata
- Eupithecia scaphiata
- Eupithecia schiefereri
- Eupithecia schnitzleri
- Eupithecia schuetzeata
- Eupithecia schwingenschussi
- Eupithecia scione
- Eupithecia sclerata
- Eupithecia scopariata
- Eupithecia scoriodes
- Eupithecia scortillata
- Eupithecia scotodes
- Eupithecia scribai
- Eupithecia seatacama
- Eupithecia sectila
- Eupithecia sectilinea
- Eupithecia seditiosa
- Eupithecia segregata
- Eupithecia selinata
- Eupithecia sellia
- Eupithecia sellimima
- Eupithecia selva
- Eupithecia semicalva
- Eupithecia semiflavata
- Eupithecia semigraphata
- Eupithecia semilignata
- Eupithecia semilotaria
- Eupithecia semilugens
- Eupithecia seminigra
- Eupithecia semipallida
- Eupithecia semirufescens
- Eupithecia semivacua
- Eupithecia sempiterna
- Eupithecia senorita
- Eupithecia separata
- Eupithecia serenata
- Eupithecia serpentigena
- Eupithecia severa
- Eupithecia sewardata
- Eupithecia sexpunctata
- Eupithecia shachdarensis
- Eupithecia sharronata
- Eupithecia sheppardata
- Eupithecia shikokuensis
- Eupithecia shirleyata
- Eupithecia siata
- Eupithecia sibylla
- Eupithecia sierrae
- Eupithecia signigera
- Eupithecia silenata
- Eupithecia silenicolata
- Eupithecia simpliciata
- Eupithecia sincera
- Eupithecia singhalensis
- Eupithecia sinicaria
- Eupithecia sinuata
- Eupithecia sinuosaria
- Eupithecia skoui
- Eupithecia slossonata
- Eupithecia sobria
- Eupithecia sodalis
- Eupithecia sogai
- Eupithecia sola
- Eupithecia solianikovi
- Eupithecia somereni
- Eupithecia sonora
- Eupithecia sophia
- Eupithecia sorda
- Eupithecia soricella
- Eupithecia spadiceata
- Eupithecia specialis
- Eupithecia spermaphaga
- Eupithecia sperryi
- Eupithecia spilocyma
- Eupithecia spilosata
- Eupithecia spinibarbata
- Eupithecia spissata
- Eupithecia spissilineata
- Eupithecia sporobola
- Eupithecia spurcata
- Eupithecia stagira
- Eupithecia stataria
- Eupithecia staurophragma
- Eupithecia steeleae
- Eupithecia stellata
- Eupithecia stertzi
- Eupithecia sticticata
- Eupithecia stigmaticata
- Eupithecia stigmatophora
- Eupithecia stomachosa
- Eupithecia strattonata
- Eupithecia streptozona
- Eupithecia strigatissima
- Eupithecia studiosa
- Eupithecia stueningi
- Eupithecia stypheliae
- Eupithecia subalba
- Eupithecia subanis
- Eupithecia subapicata
- Eupithecia subbreviata
- Eupithecia subbrunneata
- Eupithecia subcanipars
- Eupithecia subcolorata
- Eupithecia subconclusaria
- Eupithecia subdeverrata
- Eupithecia subexiguata
- Eupithecia subextremata
- Eupithecia subfenestrata
- Eupithecia subflavolineata
- Eupithecia subfumosa
- Eupithecia subfuscata
- Eupithecia subinduta
- Eupithecia sublata
- Eupithecia submiranda
- Eupithecia subnixa
- Eupithecia suboxydata
- Eupithecia subplacida
- Eupithecia subpulchrata
- Eupithecia subregulosa
- Eupithecia subrubescens
- Eupithecia subscriptaria
- Eupithecia subsequaria
- Eupithecia subtacincta
- Eupithecia subtilis
- Eupithecia subumbrata
- Eupithecia subvaticina
- Eupithecia subvirens
- Eupithecia subvulgata
- Eupithecia succenturiata
- Eupithecia succernata
- Eupithecia sucidata
- Eupithecia summissa
- Eupithecia superata
- Eupithecia supercastigata
- Eupithecia supersophia
- Eupithecia supporta
- Eupithecia suspiciosata
- Eupithecia sutiliata
- Eupithecia svetlanae
- Eupithecia swanni
- Eupithecia swettii
- Eupithecia sylpharia
- Eupithecia syriacata
- Eupithecia szaboi
- Eupithecia szelenyica

=== T ===
- Eupithecia tabacata
- Eupithecia tabestana
- Eupithecia taiwana
- Eupithecia takao
- Eupithecia tamara
- Eupithecia tamarugalis
- Eupithecia tantillaria
- Eupithecia tantilloides
- Eupithecia tarapaca
- Eupithecia tarensis
- Eupithecia tarfata
- Eupithecia tectaria
- Eupithecia tempestuosa
- Eupithecia tenellata
- Eupithecia tenera
- Eupithecia tenerifensis
- Eupithecia tenoensis
- Eupithecia tenuata
- Eupithecia tenuiata
- Eupithecia tenuiscripta
- Eupithecia tenuisquama
- Eupithecia tepida
- Eupithecia terrenata
- Eupithecia terrestrata
- Eupithecia tesserata
- Eupithecia testacea
- Eupithecia tetraglena
- Eupithecia thaica
- Eupithecia thalictrata
- Eupithecia theobromina
- Eupithecia thermosaria
- Eupithecia thessa
- Eupithecia thiaucourti
- Eupithecia thomasi
- Eupithecia thomasina
- Eupithecia tibetana
- Eupithecia tornolopha
- Eupithecia toulgoeti
- Eupithecia trampa
- Eupithecia trancasae
- Eupithecia tranquilla
- Eupithecia transacta
- Eupithecia transalaiensis
- Eupithecia transexpiata
- Eupithecia tremula
- Eupithecia triangulifera
- Eupithecia tribunaria
- Eupithecia tricerata
- Eupithecia tricolorata
- Eupithecia tricrossa
- Eupithecia tricuspis
- Eupithecia trigenuata
- Eupithecia tripolitaniata
- Eupithecia tripunctaria
- Eupithecia trisignaria
- Eupithecia trita
- Eupithecia tritaria
- Eupithecia tropicata
- Eupithecia truncatipennis
- Eupithecia truschi
- Eupithecia tshimganica
- Eupithecia tshimkentensis
- Eupithecia turbanta
- Eupithecia turkmena
- Eupithecia turlini
- Eupithecia turpicula
- Eupithecia turpis
- Eupithecia tutsiana

=== U-V ===
- Eupithecia uighurica
- Eupithecia uinta
- Eupithecia ultimaria
- Eupithecia ultrix
- Eupithecia undata
- Eupithecia undiculata
- Eupithecia undulataria
- Eupithecia undulifera
- Eupithecia unedonata
- Eupithecia unicolor
- Eupithecia unitaria
- Eupithecia urbanata
- Eupithecia ursina
- Eupithecia usbeca
- Eupithecia usta
- Eupithecia ustata
- Eupithecia utae
- Eupithecia uvaria
- Eupithecia vacuata
- Eupithecia valdivia
- Eupithecia valeria
- Eupithecia valerianata
- Eupithecia vallenarensis
- Eupithecia vana
- Eupithecia variostrigata
- Eupithecia vasta
- Eupithecia vaticina
- Eupithecia veleta
- Eupithecia velutipennis
- Eupithecia venedictoffae
- Eupithecia venosata
- Eupithecia venulata
- Eupithecia veratraria
- Eupithecia verecunda
- Eupithecia vermiculata
- Eupithecia verprota
- Eupithecia versiplaga
- Eupithecia vesiculata
- Eupithecia vetula
- Eupithecia viata
- Eupithecia vicina
- Eupithecia vicksburgi
- Eupithecia viduata
- Eupithecia vilis
- Eupithecia villica
- Eupithecia vinaceata
- Eupithecia vinibua
- Eupithecia violacea
- Eupithecia violetta
- Eupithecia viperea
- Eupithecia virescens
- Eupithecia virgaureata
- Eupithecia vitiosata
- Eupithecia vitreotata
- Eupithecia vivida
- Eupithecia vojnitsi
- Eupithecia voraria
- Eupithecia vulgata

=== W-Z ===
- Eupithecia wangi
- Eupithecia wardi
- Eupithecia weigti
- Eupithecia weissi
- Eupithecia westonaria
- Eupithecia wilemani
- Eupithecia wittmeri
- Eupithecia woodgatata
- Eupithecia xanthomixta
- Eupithecia xylopsis
- Eupithecia yakushimensis
- Eupithecia yangana
- Eupithecia yasudai
- Eupithecia yathomi
- Eupithecia yazakii
- Eupithecia yelchoensis
- Eupithecia yoshimotoi
- Eupithecia yubitzae
- Eupithecia yunnani
- Eupithecia zagrosata
- Eupithecia zekiyae
- Eupithecia zelmira
- Eupithecia zibellinata
- Eupithecia zingiberiata
- Eupithecia zombensis
- Eupithecia zygadeniata

== Species of unknown status ==
- Eupithecia lavicaria Fuchs, 1902 (syn: Eupithecia lavicata Prout, 1914), described from Norway.
- Eupithecia minutana Treitschke
- Eupithecia robusta Dietze, 1910

== Other sources ==
- Chinery, Michael (1986). Collins Guide to the Insects of Britain and Western Europe (Reprinted 1991).
- Skinner, Bernard (1984). Colour Identification Guide to Moths of the British Isles.
