= Eupithecia valeria =

Scientific classification
- Domain: Eukaryota
- Kingdom: Animalia
- Phylum: Arthropoda
- Class: Insecta
- Order: Lepidoptera
- Family: Geometridae
- Genus: Eupithecia
- Species: E. valeria

Binomial name
- Eupithecia valeria Schaus, 1913

Species of moth

Eupithecia valeria is a moth in the family Geometridae and is found in Costa Rica.
