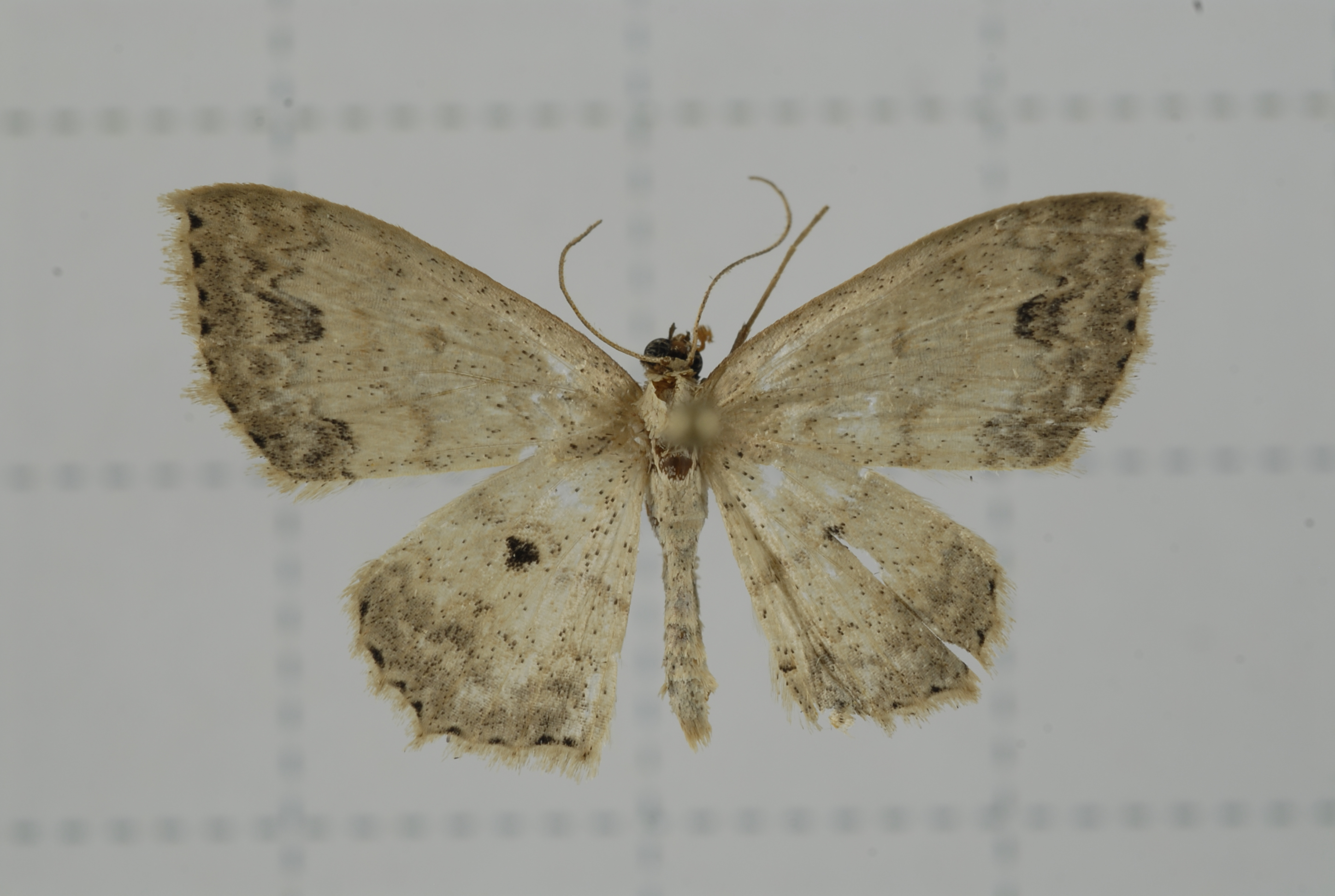

Scientific classification
- Domain: Eukaryota
- Kingdom: Animalia
- Phylum: Arthropoda
- Class: Insecta
- Order: Lepidoptera
- Family: Geometridae
- Genus: Scopula
- Species: S. punctatissima

Binomial name
- Scopula punctatissima (Bastelberger, 1911)

Synonyms
- Acidalia punctatissima Bastelberger, 1911; Acidalia quadrimacula Wileman, 1915

= Scopula punctatissima =

Species of geometer moth in subfamily Sterrhinae

Scopula punctatissima is a moth of the family Geometridae. It is found in Taiwan.
