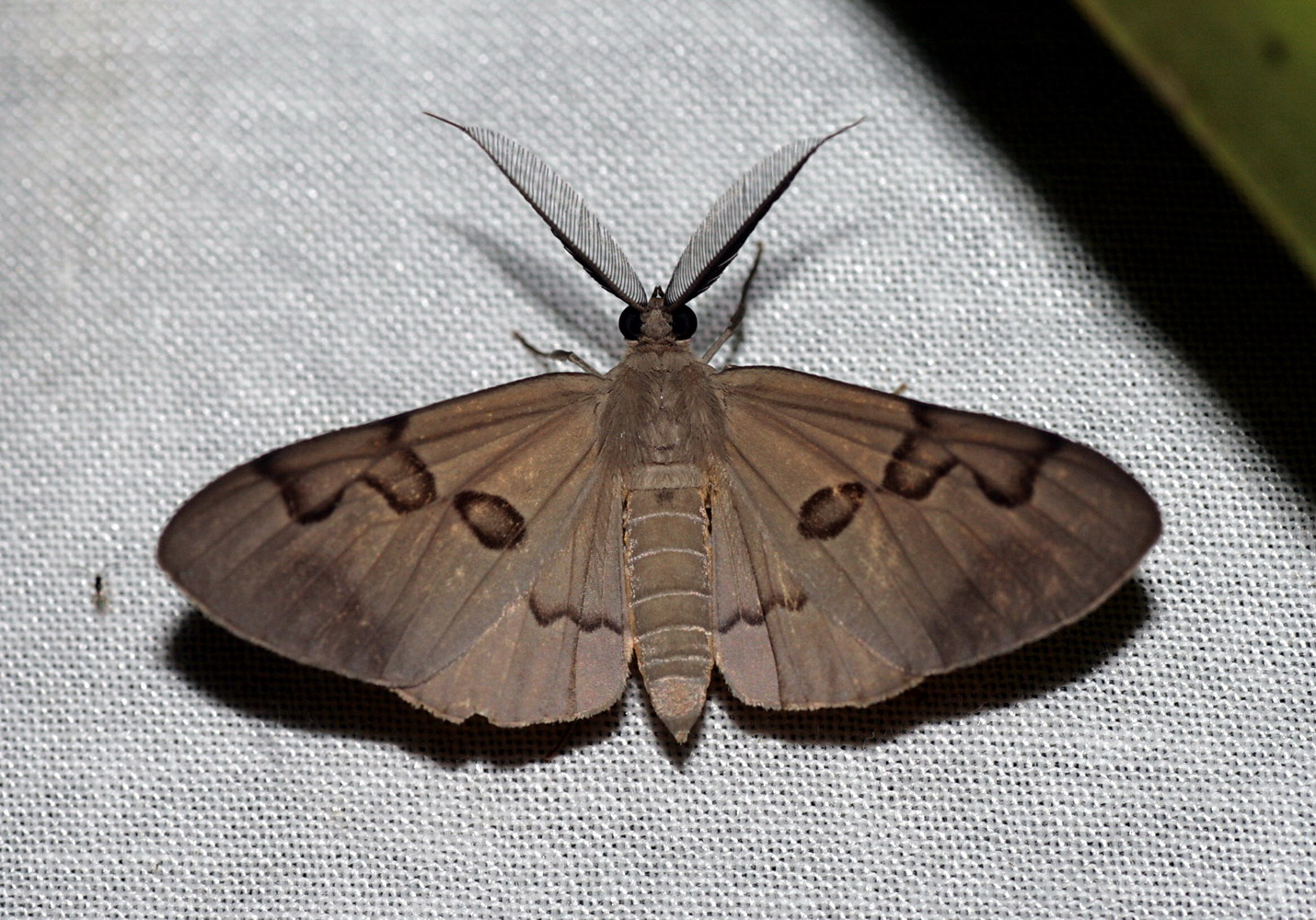
- From Borneo

Scientific classification
- Domain: Eukaryota
- Kingdom: Animalia
- Phylum: Arthropoda
- Class: Insecta
- Order: Lepidoptera
- Family: Geometridae
- Genus: Hypochrosis
- Species: H. subrufa

Binomial name
- Hypochrosis subrufa (Bastelberger, 1908)

Synonyms
- Patruissa subrufa Bastelberger, 1908; Hypochrosis sanguiniscripta BHerbulot, 1985

= Hypochrosis subrufa =

Species of moth

Hypochrosis subrufa is a geometer moth in the subfamily Ennominae first described by Max Bastelberger in 1908. The species can be found in lowland forests in Borneo and Palawan.
