= Scopula planidisca =

Scientific classification
- Domain: Eukaryota
- Kingdom: Animalia
- Phylum: Arthropoda
- Class: Insecta
- Order: Lepidoptera
- Family: Geometridae
- Genus: Scopula
- Species: S. planidisca

Binomial name
- Scopula planidisca (Bastelberger, 1908)

Synonyms
- Acidalia planidisca Bastelberger, 1908

Species of geometer moth in subfamily Sterrhinae

Scopula planidisca is a moth of the family Geometridae. It is found in Peninsular Malaysia.
