= Eupithecia bellimargo =

Scientific classification
- Domain: Eukaryota
- Kingdom: Animalia
- Phylum: Arthropoda
- Class: Insecta
- Order: Lepidoptera
- Family: Geometridae
- Genus: Eupithecia
- Species: E. bellimargo

Binomial name
- Eupithecia bellimargo (Bastelberger, 1907)

Synonyms
- Tephroclystia bellimargo Bastelberger, 1907

Species of moth

Eupithecia bellimargo is a moth in the family Geometridae. It is found in Argentina.
