= Scopula atramentaria =

Scientific classification
- Kingdom: Animalia
- Phylum: Arthropoda
- Class: Insecta
- Order: Lepidoptera
- Family: Geometridae
- Genus: Scopula
- Species: S. atramentaria

Binomial name
- Scopula atramentaria (Bastelberger, 1909)

Synonyms
- Craspedia atramentaria Bastelberger, 1909

Species of geometer moth in subfamily Sterrhinae

Scopula atramentaria is a moth of the family Geometridae. It was described by Max Bastelberger in 1909. It is endemic to Tanzania.
