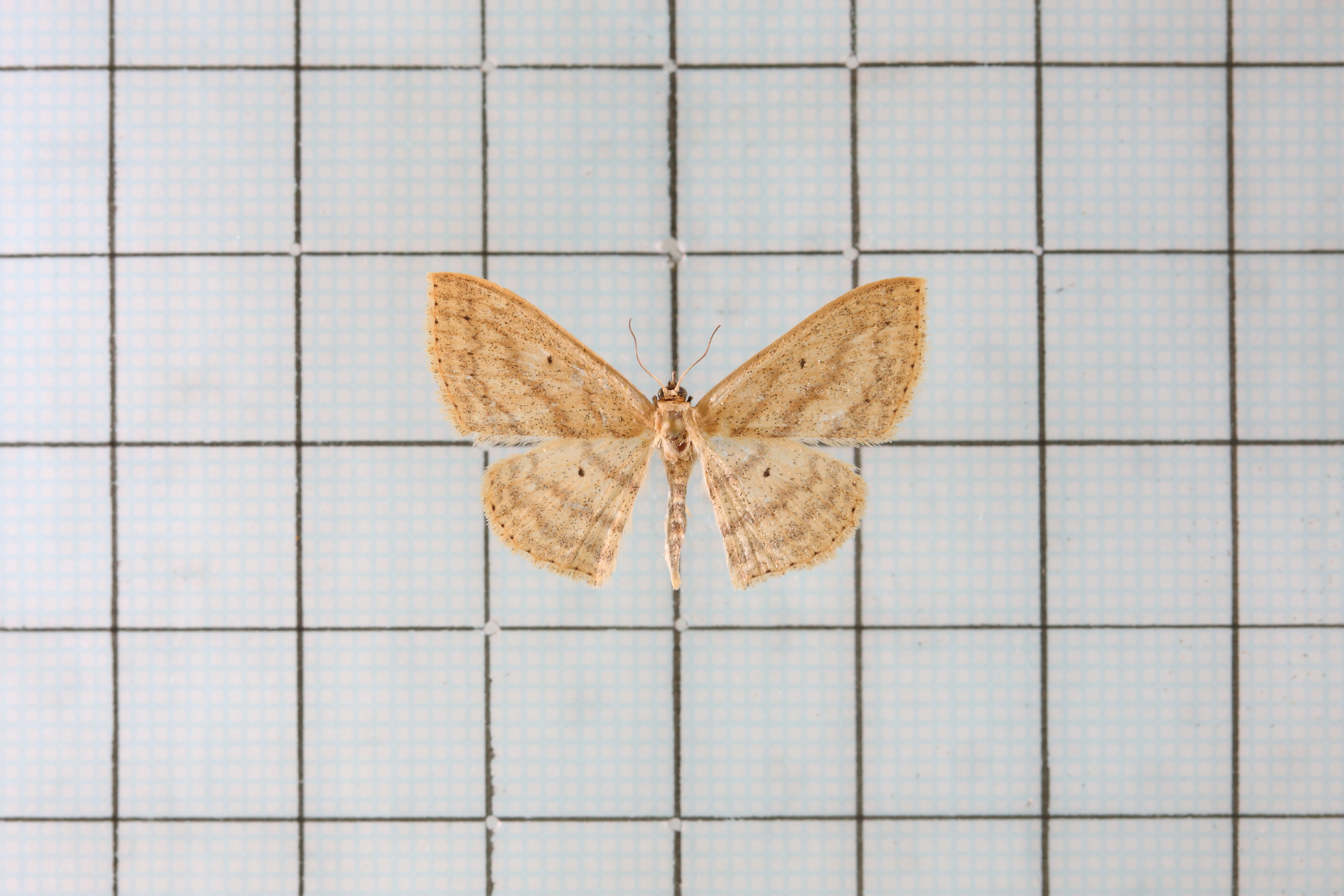
- Mounted adult

Scientific classification
- Kingdom: Animalia
- Phylum: Arthropoda
- Class: Insecta
- Order: Lepidoptera
- Family: Geometridae
- Genus: Scopula
- Species: S. kagiata

Binomial name
- Scopula kagiata (Bastelberger, 1909)

Synonyms
- Emmiltis kagiata Bastelberger, 1909

= Scopula kagiata =

Species of moth

Scopula kagiata is a species of moth of the family Geometridae. It was described by Max Bastelberger in 1909. It is endemic to Taiwan.
