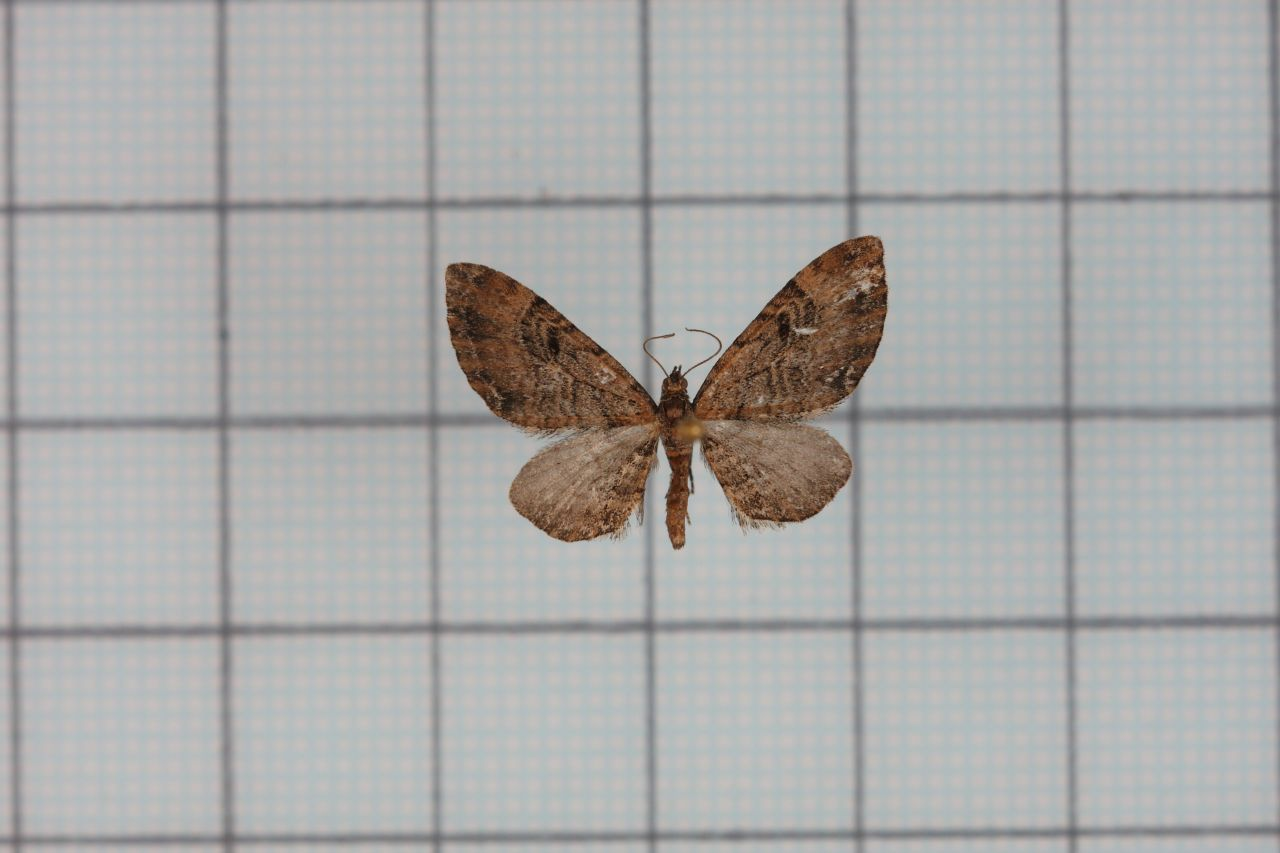

Scientific classification
- Domain: Eukaryota
- Kingdom: Animalia
- Phylum: Arthropoda
- Class: Insecta
- Order: Lepidoptera
- Family: Geometridae
- Genus: Eupithecia
- Species: E. nuceistrigata

Binomial name
- Eupithecia nuceistrigata Bastelberger, 1911

= Eupithecia nuceistrigata =

Species of moth

Eupithecia nuceistrigata is a moth in the family Geometridae. It is found in Taiwan.
