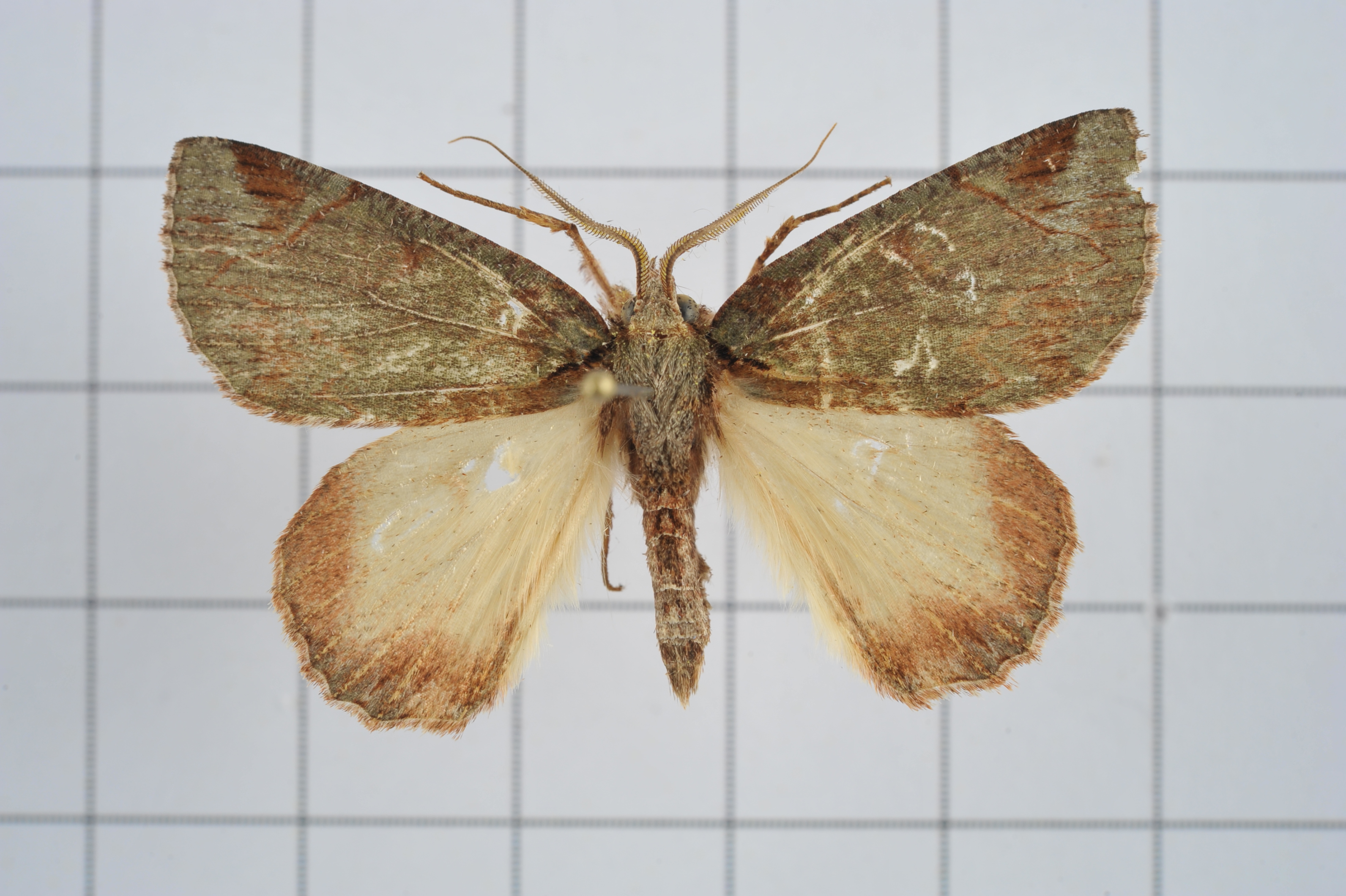

Scientific classification
- Kingdom: Animalia
- Phylum: Arthropoda
- Class: Insecta
- Order: Lepidoptera
- Family: Geometridae
- Genus: Dindica
- Species: D. purpurata

Binomial name
- Dindica purpurata Bastelberger, 1911

= Dindica purpurata =

Species of moth

Dindica purpurata is a moth of the family Geometridae first described by Max Bastelberger in 1911. It is found in Taiwan.
