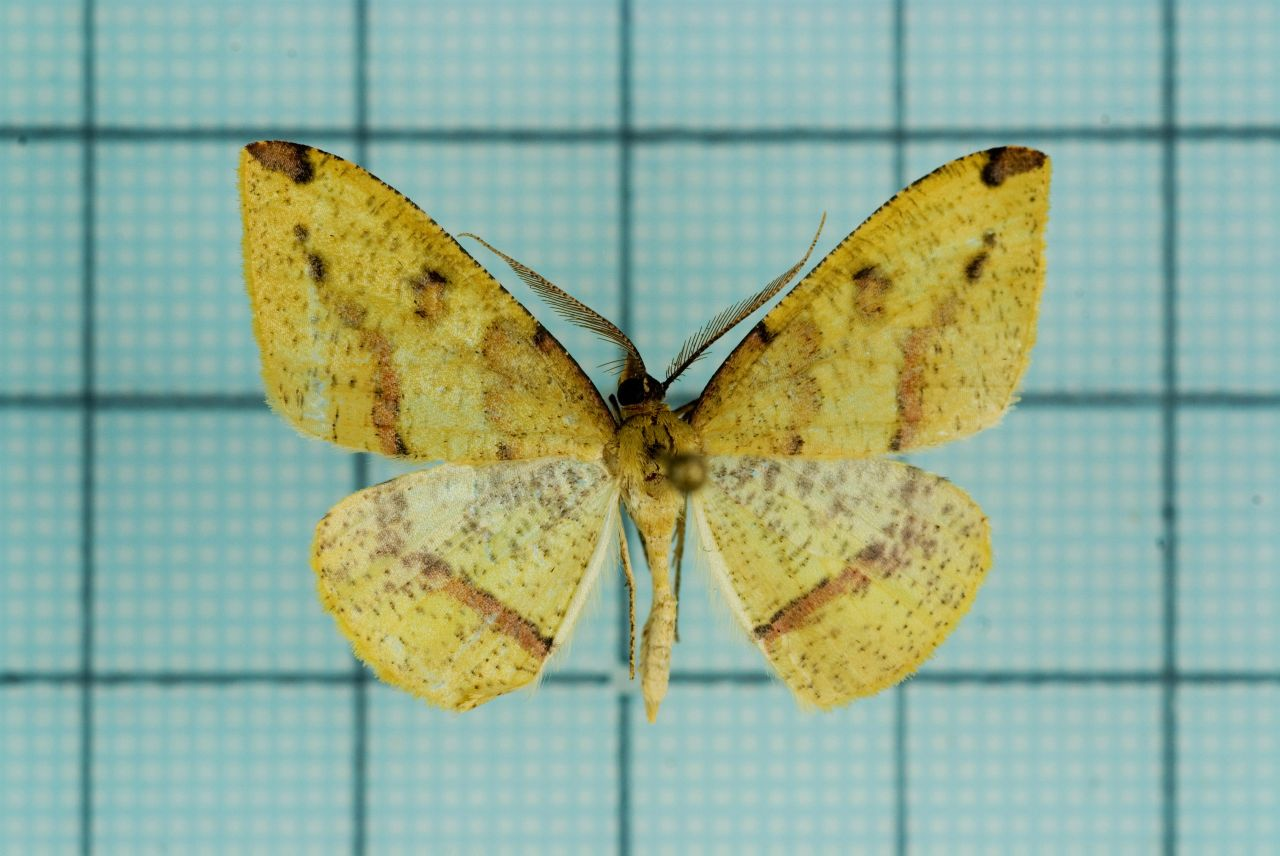

Scientific classification
- Kingdom: Animalia
- Phylum: Arthropoda
- Class: Insecta
- Order: Lepidoptera
- Family: Geometridae
- Genus: Heterolocha
- Species: H. biplagiata

Binomial name
- Heterolocha biplagiata Bastelberger, 1909

= Heterolocha biplagiata =

Species of moth

Heterolocha biplagiata is a species of moth in the family Geometridae first described by Max Bastelberger in 1909. It is found in Taiwan.

The wingspan is 28–33 mm.
