= Eupithecia paryphata =

Scientific classification
- Domain: Eukaryota
- Kingdom: Animalia
- Phylum: Arthropoda
- Class: Insecta
- Order: Lepidoptera
- Family: Geometridae
- Genus: Eupithecia
- Species: E. paryphata

Binomial name
- Eupithecia paryphata (Bastelberger, 1908)

Synonyms
- Tephroclystia paryphata Bastelberger, 1908

Species of moth

Eupithecia paryphata is a moth in the family Geometridae. It is found in Bolivia.
