= Eupithecia junctifascia =

Scientific classification
- Domain: Eukaryota
- Kingdom: Animalia
- Phylum: Arthropoda
- Class: Insecta
- Order: Lepidoptera
- Family: Geometridae
- Genus: Eupithecia
- Species: E. junctifascia

Binomial name
- Eupithecia junctifascia (Bastelberger, 1907)

Synonyms
- Hypolepis junctifascia Bastelberger, 1907; Eupithecia venusta Schaus, 1913

Species of moth

Eupithecia junctifascia is a moth in the family Geometridae. It is found in Colombia and Costa Rica.
