= Scopula mascula =

Scientific classification
- Domain: Eukaryota
- Kingdom: Animalia
- Phylum: Arthropoda
- Class: Insecta
- Order: Lepidoptera
- Family: Geometridae
- Genus: Scopula
- Species: S. mascula

Binomial name
- Scopula mascula (Bastelberger, 1909)

Synonyms
- Acidalia mascula Bastelberger, 1909

Species of geometer moth in subfamily Sterrhinae

Scopula mascula is a moth of the family Geometridae. It is found in Mozambique.
