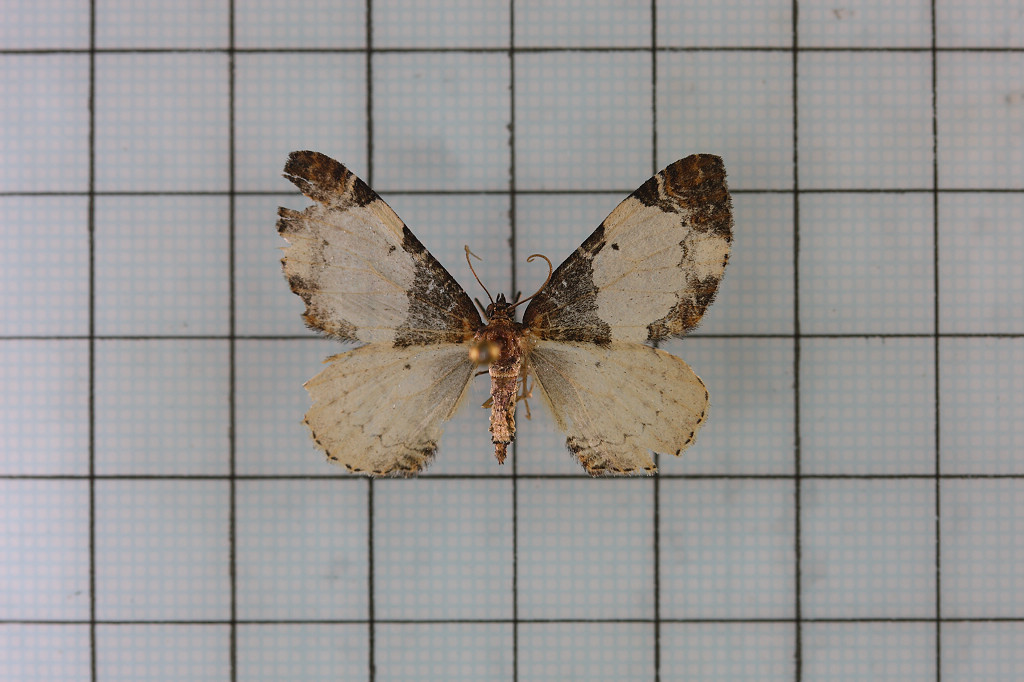

Scientific classification
- Kingdom: Animalia
- Phylum: Arthropoda
- Class: Insecta
- Order: Lepidoptera
- Family: Geometridae
- Genus: Protonebula
- Species: P. altera

Binomial name
- Protonebula altera (Bastelberger, 1911)

Synonyms
- Mesoleuca altera Bastelberger, 1911

= Protonebula altera =

Species of moth

Protonebula altera is a species of moth of the family Geometridae first described by Max Bastelberger in 1911. It is found in Taiwan.
