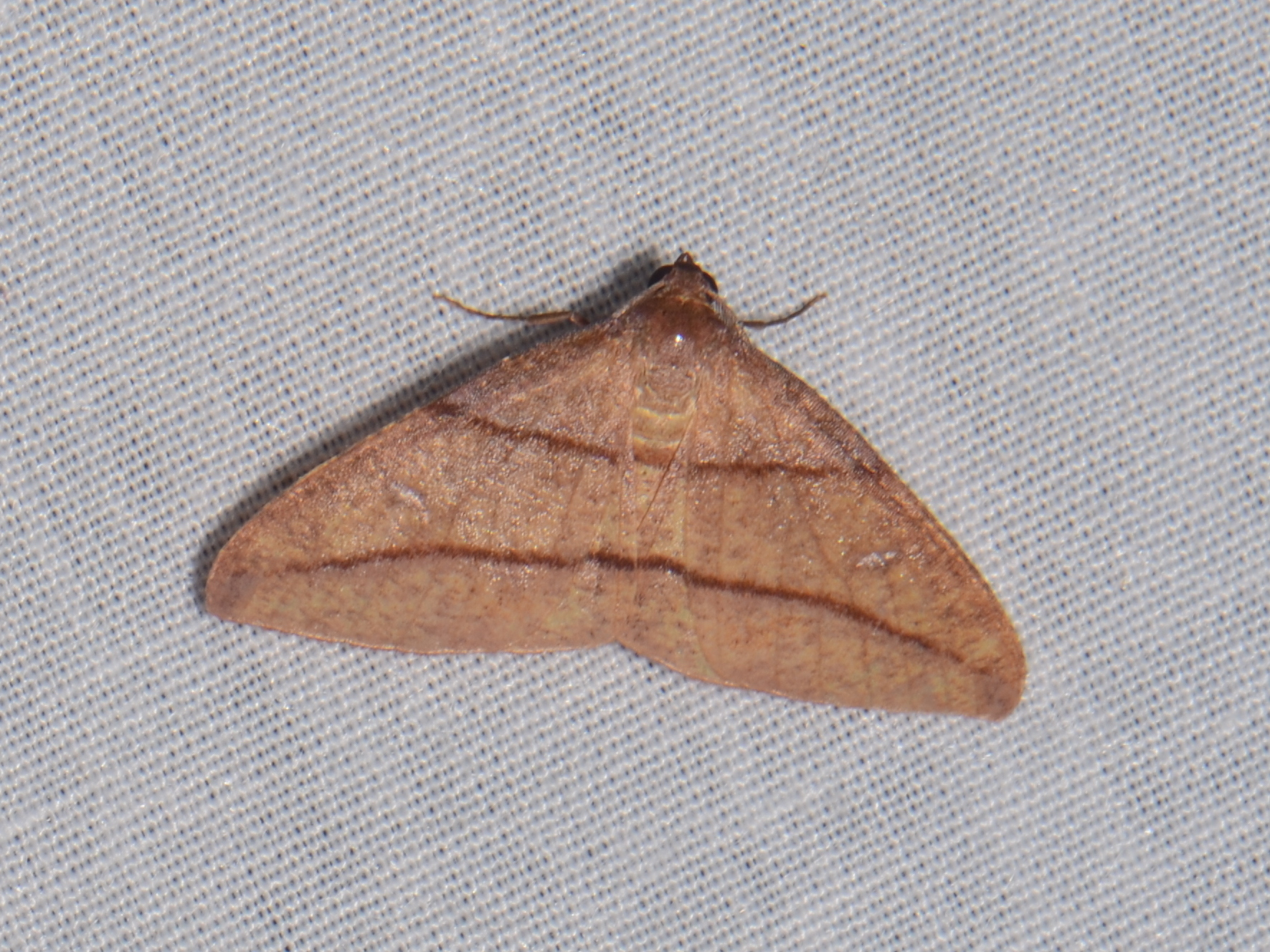

Scientific classification
- Kingdom: Animalia
- Phylum: Arthropoda
- Clade: Pancrustacea
- Class: Insecta
- Order: Lepidoptera
- Family: Geometridae
- Genus: Heterolocha
- Species: H. declinata

Binomial name
- Heterolocha declinata Prout, 1928

= Heterolocha declinata =

Species of moth

Heterolocha declinata is a species of moth that belongs to the family Geometridae (Geometer moths). This species can be found on the Island of Sumatra in Indonesia.

The species was described in 1928 by Louis Beethoven Prout, an English entomologist and musicologist.
