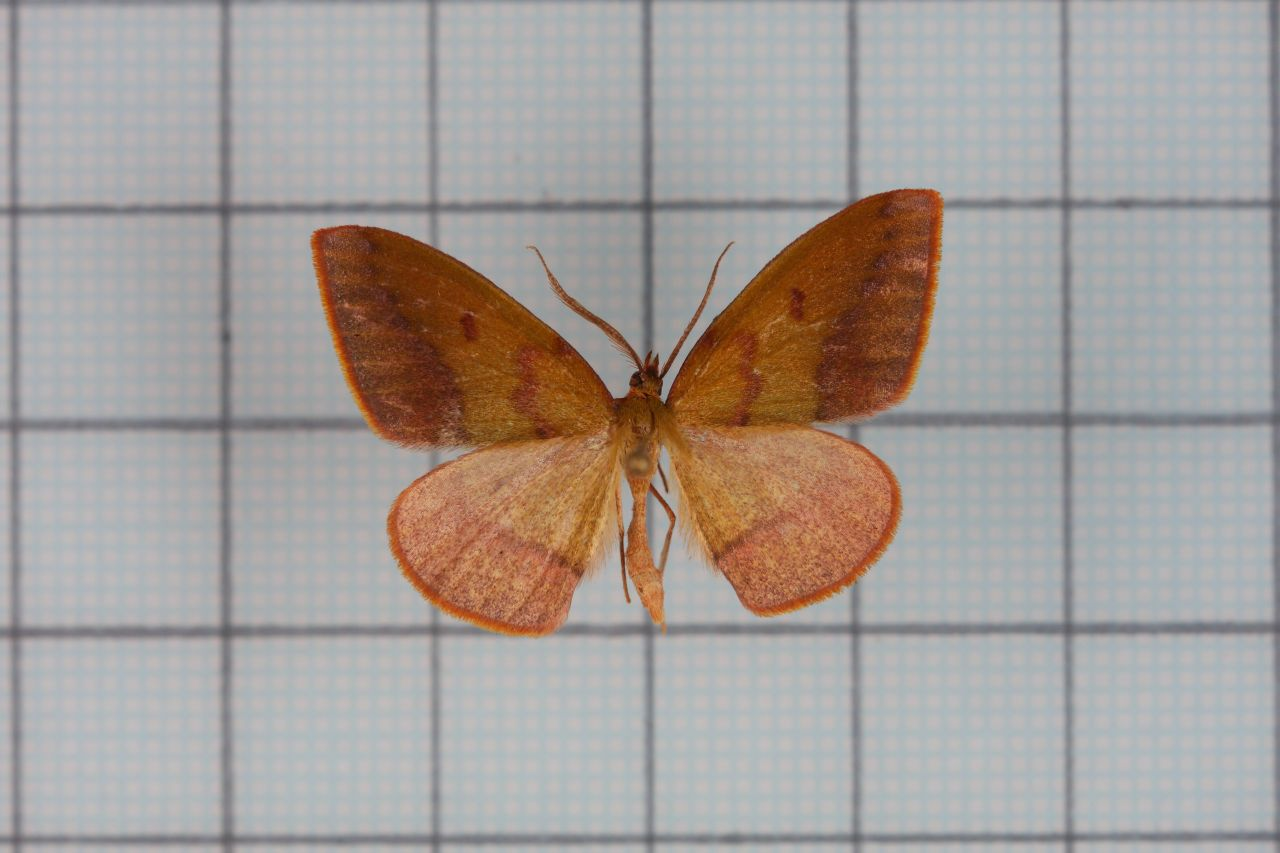

Scientific classification
- Kingdom: Animalia
- Phylum: Arthropoda
- Class: Insecta
- Order: Lepidoptera
- Family: Geometridae
- Genus: Heterolocha
- Species: H. marginata

Binomial name
- Heterolocha marginata Wileman, 1910

= Heterolocha marginata =

Species of moth

Heterolocha marginata is a species of moth in the family Geometridae first described by Alfred Ernest Wileman in 1910. It is found in Taiwan.

The wingspan is about 35 mm.
