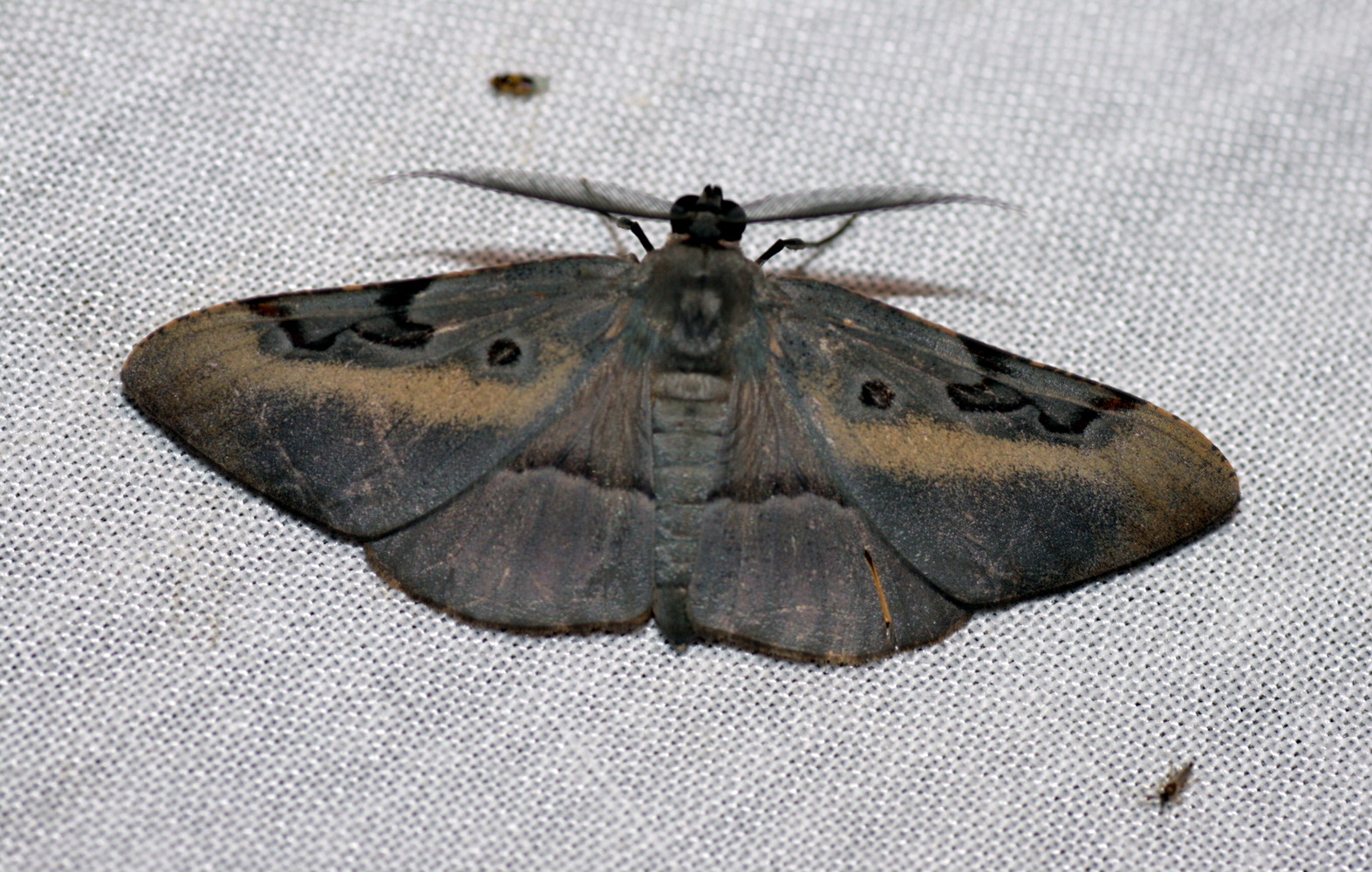

Scientific classification
- Kingdom: Animalia
- Phylum: Arthropoda
- Class: Insecta
- Order: Lepidoptera
- Family: Geometridae
- Genus: Hypochrosis
- Species: H. sternaria

Binomial name
- Hypochrosis sternaria Guenée, 1857

Synonyms
- Omiza schistacea Moore, 1878; Patruissa insulata Warren, 1909; Patruissa plagicosta Warren, 1909

= Hypochrosis sternaria =

Species of moth

Hypochrosis sternaria is a moth of the family Geometridae first described by Achille Guenée in 1857. It is found from India through Southeast Asia to Sumatra and Borneo.
