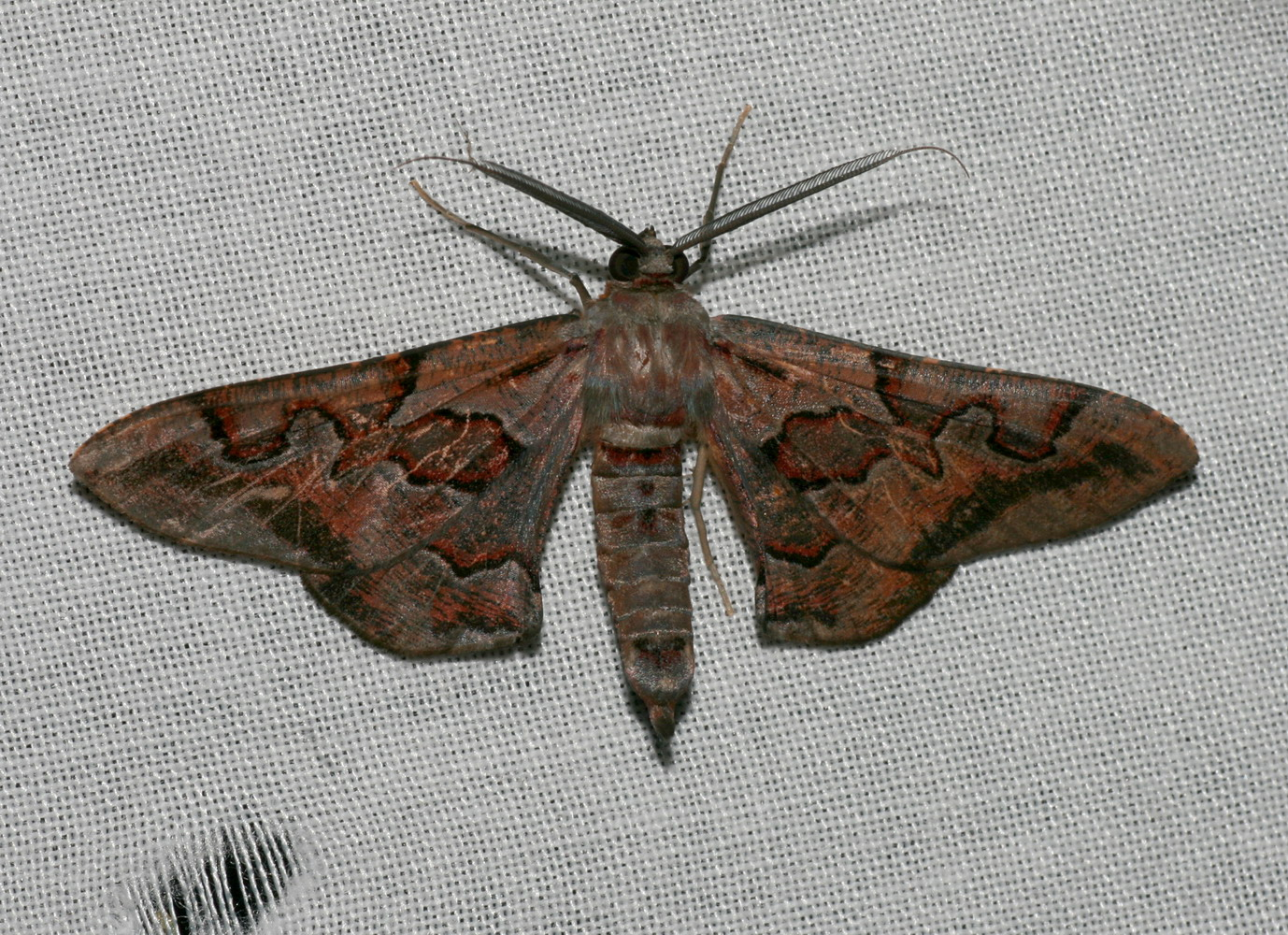

Scientific classification
- Kingdom: Animalia
- Phylum: Arthropoda
- Class: Insecta
- Order: Lepidoptera
- Family: Geometridae
- Genus: Hypochrosis
- Species: H. binexata

Binomial name
- Hypochrosis binexata (Walker, [1863])

Synonyms
- Geometra binexata Walker, 1862; Plutodes glaucaria Snellen, 1880; Patruissa ocellata Warren, 1894

= Hypochrosis binexata =

Species of moth

Hypochrosis binexata is a moth of the family Geometridae first described by Francis Walker in 1863. It is found in Borneo, Peninsular Malaysia, Sumatra and Thailand.

Larvae have been reared on Theobroma cacao.
