= Dindica subvirens =

Scientific classification
- Kingdom: Animalia
- Phylum: Arthropoda
- Class: Insecta
- Order: Lepidoptera
- Family: Geometridae
- Genus: Dindica
- Species: D. subvirens

Binomial name
- Dindica subvirens Yazaki & Wang, 2004

Species of moth

Dindica subvirens is a moth of the family Geometridae first described by Katsumi Yazaki and Min Wang in 2004. It is found in Guangdong, China.
