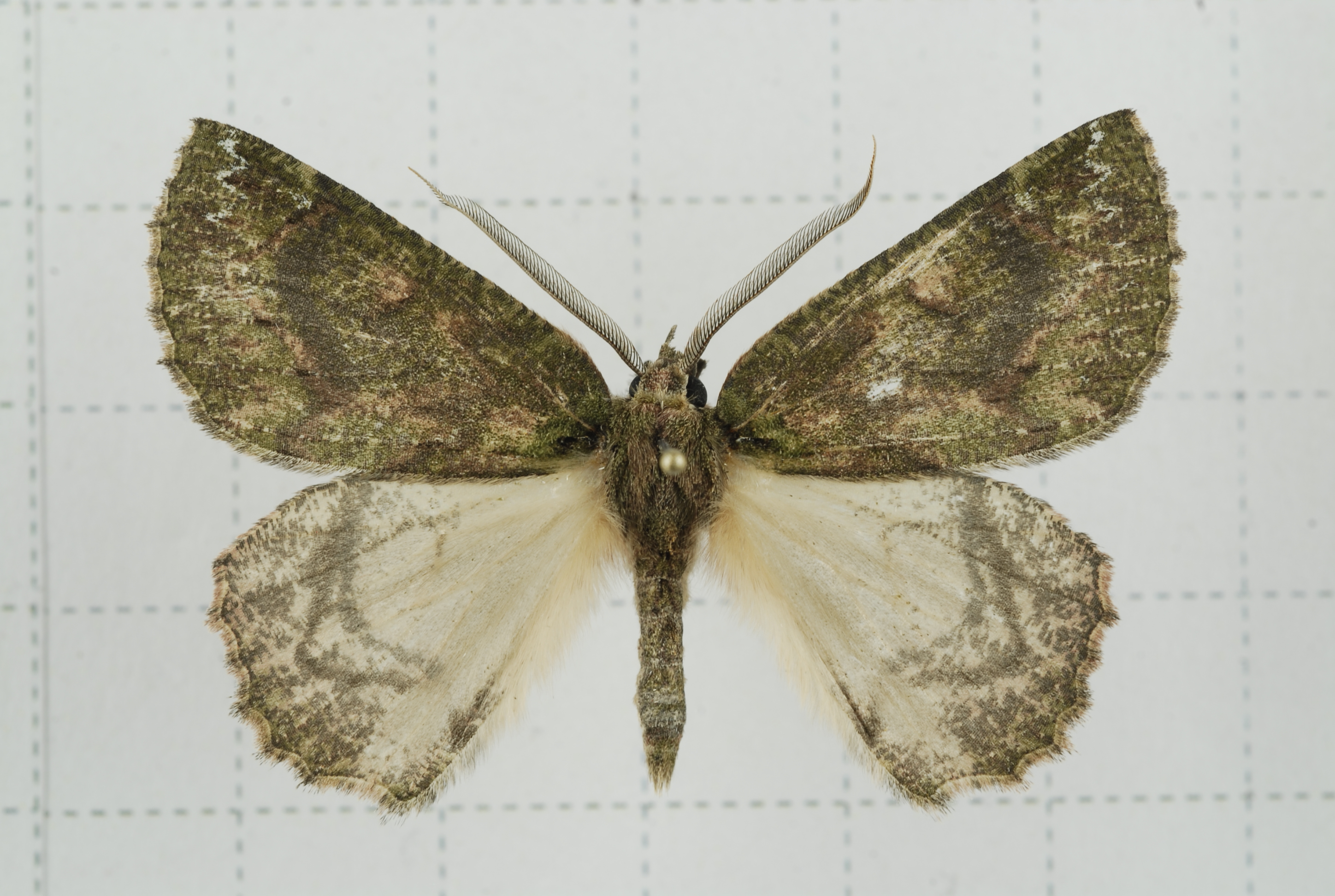

Scientific classification
- Kingdom: Animalia
- Phylum: Arthropoda
- Class: Insecta
- Order: Lepidoptera
- Family: Geometridae
- Genus: Dindica
- Species: D. kishidai

Binomial name
- Dindica kishidai Inoue, 1986

= Dindica kishidai =

Species of moth

Dindica kishidai is a moth of the family Geometridae first described by Hiroshi Inoue in 1986. It is found in Taiwan.
