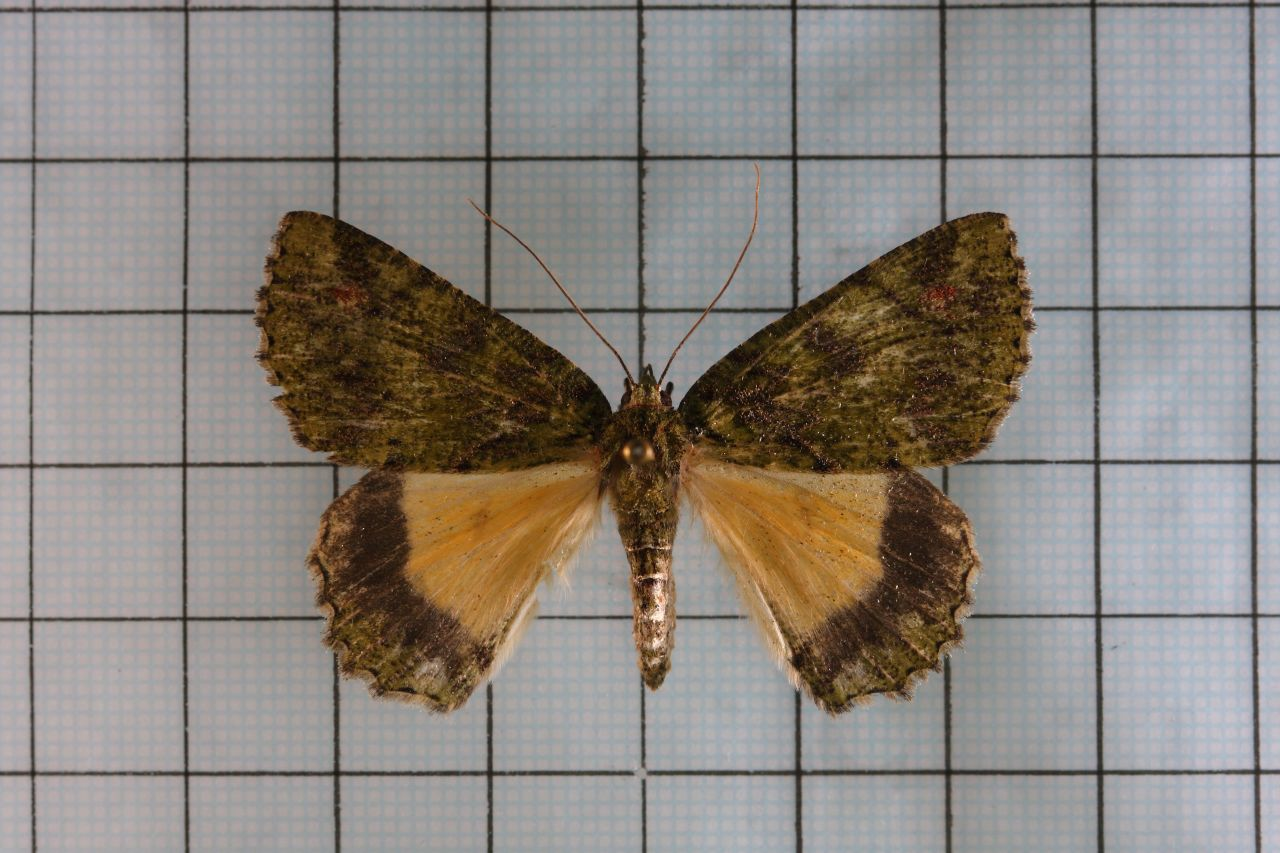

Scientific classification
- Kingdom: Animalia
- Phylum: Arthropoda
- Class: Insecta
- Order: Lepidoptera
- Family: Geometridae
- Genus: Dindica
- Species: D. polyphaenaria

Binomial name
- Dindica polyphaenaria (Guenée, 1857)

Synonyms
- Hypochroma polyphaenaria Guenée, 1857; Dindica basiflavata Moore, 1868

= Dindica polyphaenaria =

Species of moth

Dindica polyphaenaria is a moth of the family Geometridae first described by Achille Guenée in 1857. It is found in Taiwan, the Himalayas, south-east Asia and Sundaland.

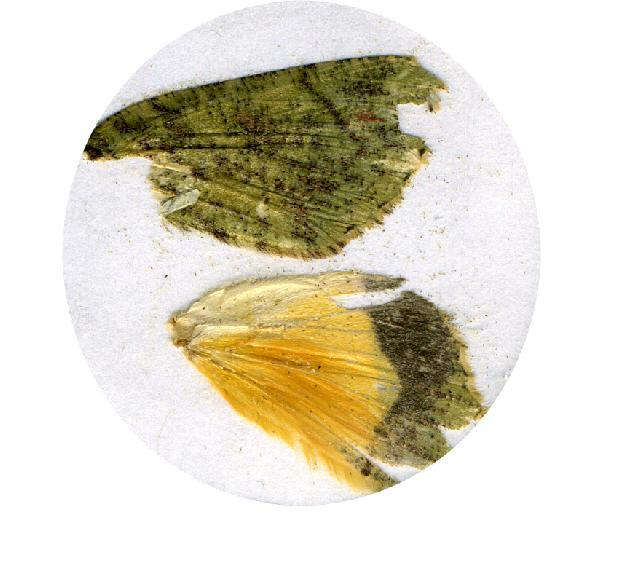
Wings

The wingspan is 45–52 mm.

The larvae feed on the young foliage of Litsea species.
