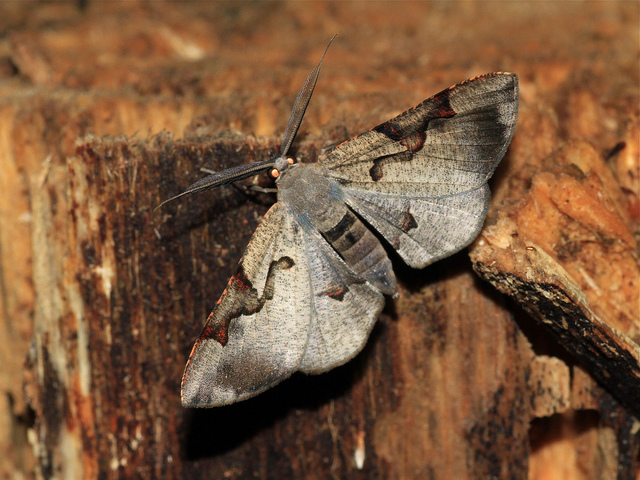
- In Borneo

Scientific classification
- Kingdom: Animalia
- Phylum: Arthropoda
- Class: Insecta
- Order: Lepidoptera
- Family: Geometridae
- Genus: Hypochrosis
- Species: H. pyrrhophaeata

Binomial name
- Hypochrosis pyrrhophaeata (Walker, [1863])

Synonyms
- Patruissa pyrrhophaeata Walker, [1863]

= Hypochrosis pyrrhophaeata =

Species of moth

Hypochrosis pyrrhophaeata is a geometer moth in the subfamily Ennominae first described by Francis Walker in 1863. It is found in the north eastern Himalayas and Sundaland. The species is common, often abundant, in lowlands and hill forests up to 2000 m.
