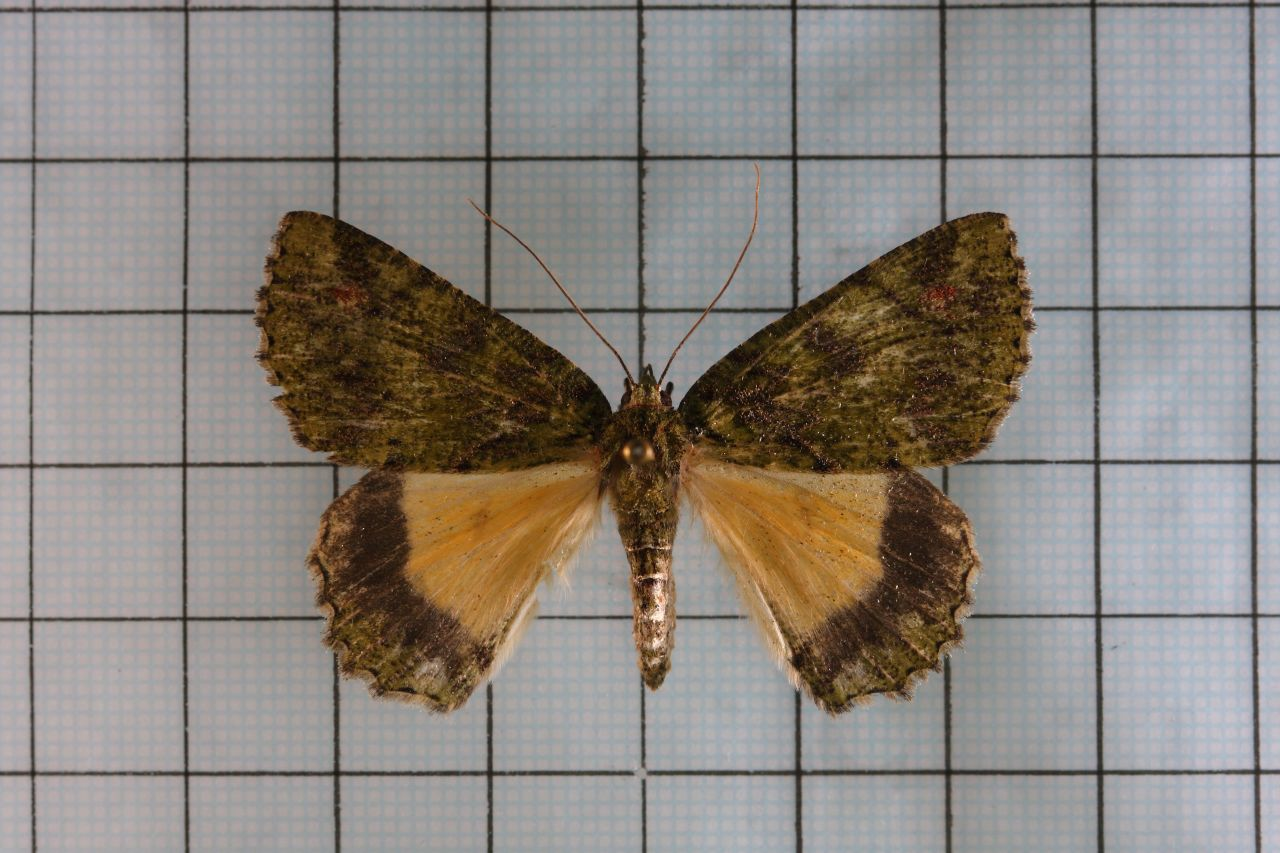

Scientific classification
- Kingdom: Animalia
- Phylum: Arthropoda
- Class: Insecta
- Order: Lepidoptera
- Family: Geometridae
- Tribe: Pseudoterpnini
- Genus: Dindica; Moore, 1888

Synonyms
- Perissolophia Warren, 1893

= Dindica =

Genus of moths

Dindica is a genus of moths in the family Geometridae.

== Species ==
- Dindica alaopis Prout, 1932
- Dindica discordia Inoue, 1990
- Dindica glaucescens Inoue, 1990
- Dindica hepatica Inoue, 1990
- Dindica kishidai Inoue, 1986
- Dindica limatula Inoue, 1990
- Dindica marginata Warren, 1894
- Dindica olivacea Inoue, 1990
- Dindica owadai Inoue, 1990
- Dindica pallens Inoue, 1990
- Dindica para Swinhoe, 1891
  - Dindica para para Swinhoe, 1891 (=Dindica erythropunctura Chu, 1981)
  - Dindica para malayana Inoue, 1990
- Dindica polyphaenaria (Guenée, [1858]) (=Hypochroma basiflavata Moore, 1868)
- Dindica purpurata Bastelberger, 1911
- Dindica semipallens Inoue, 1990
- Dindica subrosea (Warren, 1893) (=Perissolophia subsimilis Warren, 1898)
- Dindica subvirens Yazaki & Wang, 2004
- Dindica sundae Prout, 1935
- Dindica taiwana Wileman, 1914
- Dindica tienmuensis Chu, 1981
- Dindica virescens (Butler, 1878) (=Pseudoterpna koreana Alphéraky, 1897, Dindica virescens yuwanina Kawazoe & Ogata, [1963]
- Dindica wilemani Prout, 1927
- Dindica wytsmani Prout, 1927
