= Dindica marginata =

Scientific classification
- Kingdom: Animalia
- Phylum: Arthropoda
- Class: Insecta
- Order: Lepidoptera
- Family: Geometridae
- Genus: Dindica
- Species: D. marginata

Binomial name
- Dindica marginata Warren, 1894

Species of moth

Dindica marginata is a moth of the family Geometridae first described by William Warren in 1894. It is found on Sulawesi in Indonesia.
