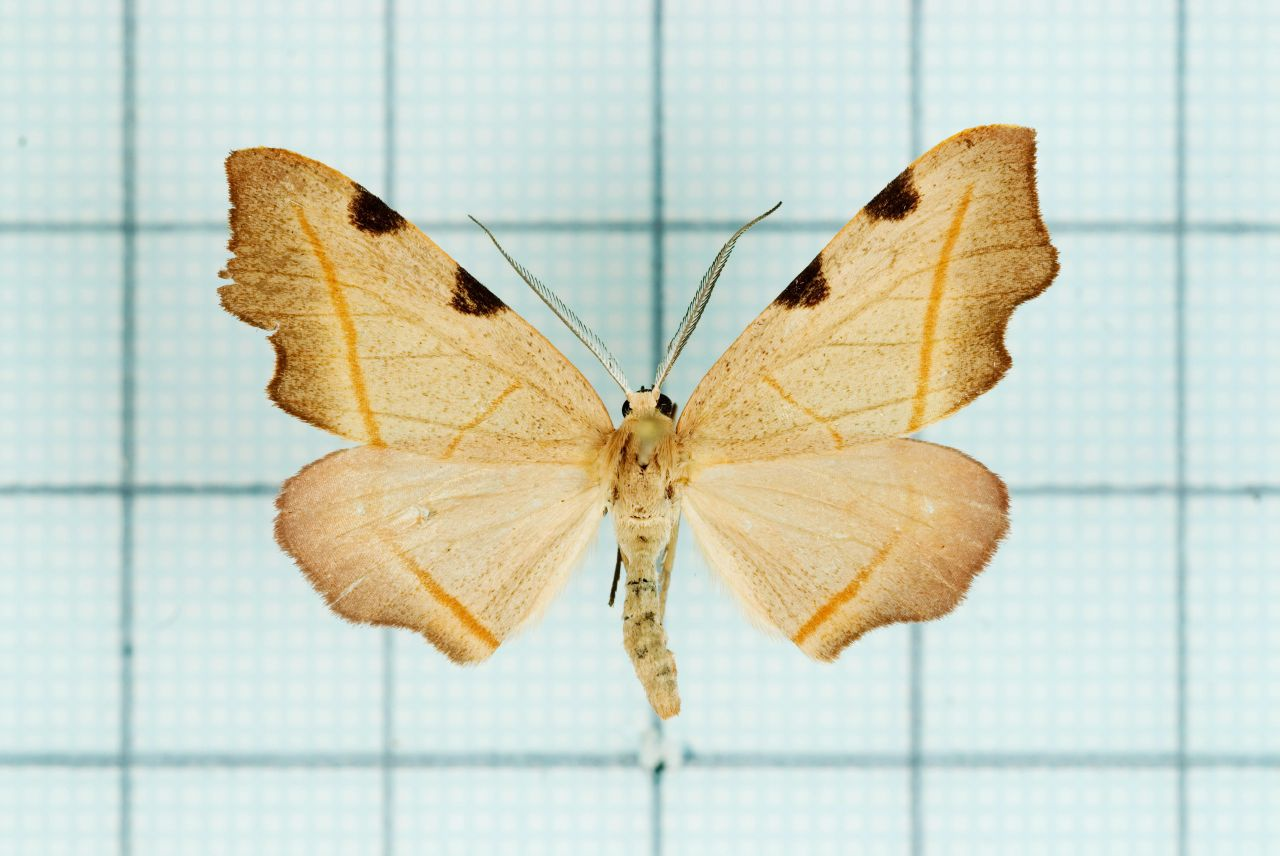

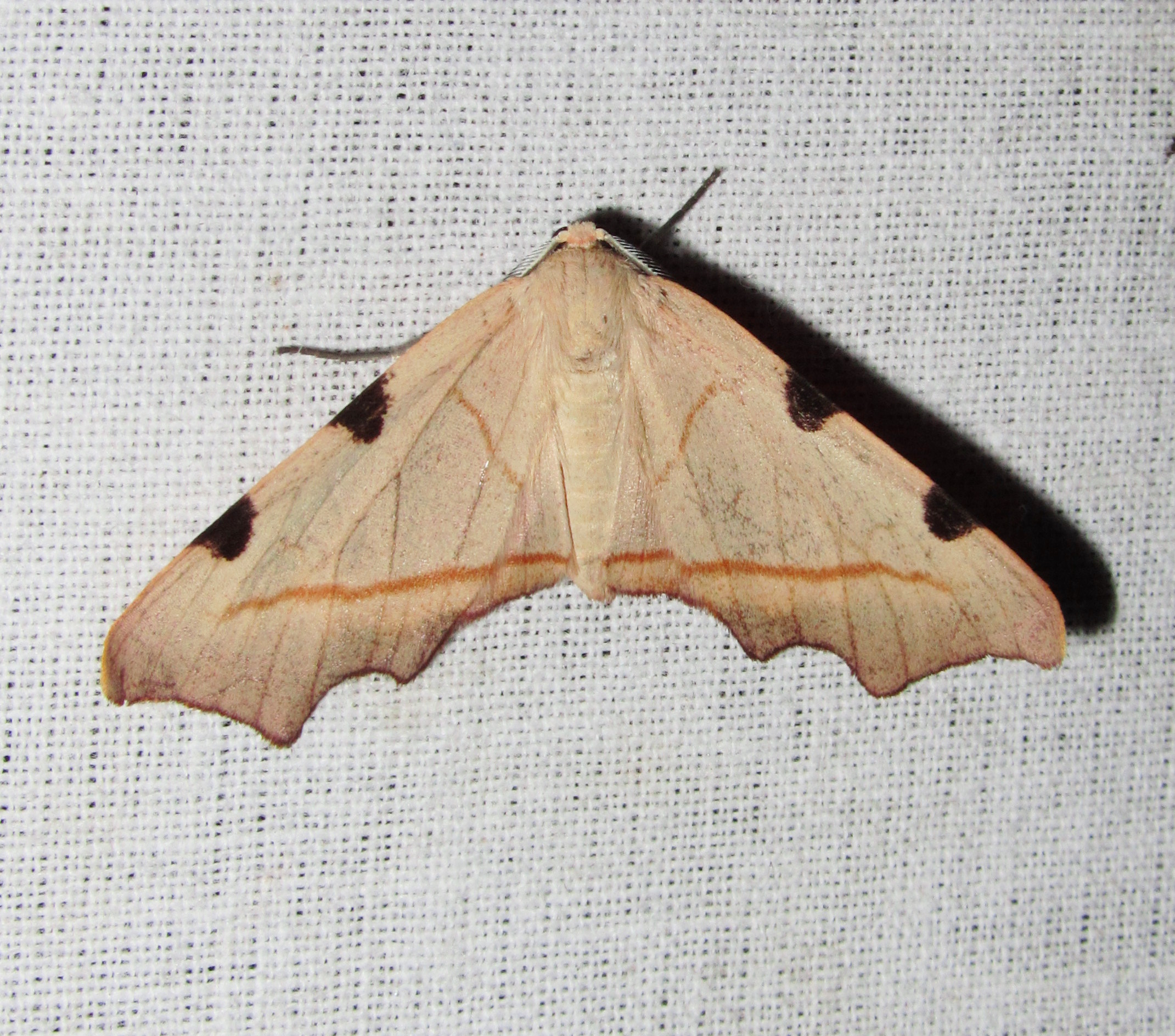

Scientific classification
- Domain: Eukaryota
- Kingdom: Animalia
- Phylum: Arthropoda
- Class: Insecta
- Order: Lepidoptera
- Family: Geometridae
- Genus: Hypochrosis
- Species: H. rufescens

Binomial name
- Hypochrosis rufescens (Butler, 1880)

Synonyms
- Pagrasa rufescens Butler, 1880

= Hypochrosis rufescens =

Species of moth

Hypochrosis rufescens is a moth of the family Geometridae first described by Arthur Gardiner Butler in 1880. It is found in India, China and Taiwan.
