= Dindica alaopis =

Scientific classification
- Kingdom: Animalia
- Phylum: Arthropoda
- Class: Insecta
- Order: Lepidoptera
- Family: Geometridae
- Genus: Dindica
- Species: D. alaopis

Binomial name
- Dindica alaopis L. B. Prout, 1932

Species of moth

Dindica alaopis is a moth of the family Geometridae first described by Louis Beethoven Prout in 1932. It is found on Borneo. The habitat consists of montane forests at altitudes ranging from 900 to 2,600 meters.
