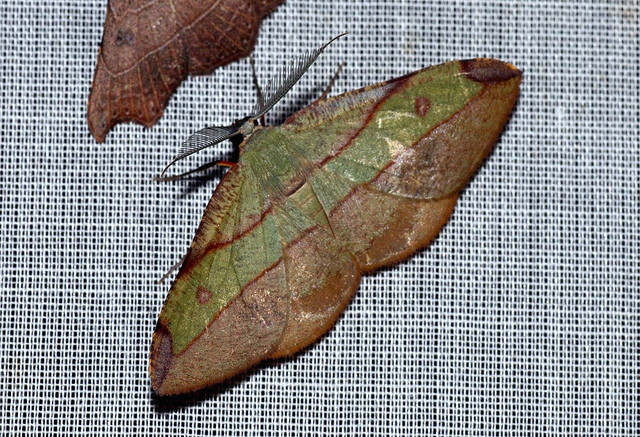
- Hypochrosis hyadaria bebaea from Malaya

Scientific classification
- Kingdom: Animalia
- Phylum: Arthropoda
- Class: Insecta
- Order: Lepidoptera
- Family: Geometridae
- Genus: Hypochrosis
- Species: H. hyadaria

Binomial name
- Hypochrosis hyadaria Guenée, 1857

Synonyms
- Marcala ignivorata Walker, [1863]; Marcala obliquaria Moore, 1888; Hypochrosis hiresia Swinhoe, 1901; Hypochrosis annulata Pagenstecher, 1896; Hypochrosis bebaea Prout, 1932; Oxydia korndoerfferi Snellen, 1877; Omiza columbaris Warren, 1896; Omiza lubricata Warren, 1899; Omiza subaurantiaca Warren, 1896

= Hypochrosis hyadaria =

Species of moth

Hypochrosis hyadaria is a geometer moth in the subfamily Ennominae described by Achille Guenée in 1857. The species has a wide range from India, Sri Lanka through Southeast Asia.

== Description ==
The wingspan of the male is 52 mm and the female's is 64 mm. Palpi porrect (extending forward), and do not reach beyond the frons. The body is a pale red, with a purplish tinge and with dark stria. Frons chestnut. Forewings with an oblique antemedial line and a small annulus at end of cell. An oblique postmedial line highly angled below apex, where it encloses a greyish lunule, running to middle of inner margin of hindwing but obsolete on costal area of hindwing, which is paler. The area between the lines of forewing often pale towards costa. Ventral side is rufous or orange yellow, often with an outer area of forewing rufous.

The species is a complex of species that are very similar in wing pattern, and can only be differentiated exactly by male genitalia differences.

== Subspecies ==
- H. h. annulata (Pagenstecher, 1896) — Philippines, Sulawesi
- H. h. bebaea (Prout, 1932) — Southeast Asia, Borneo
- H. h. korndoerfferi (Snellen, 1877) — Sumatra, Java, Bali
- H. h. lubricata (Warren, 1899) — Flores, Sumbawa
- H. h. subaurantiaca (Warren, 1896) — Timor
- H. h. form. stigmata (Smetacek, 2004) — Kumaun Himalayas
