= Dindica virescens =

Scientific classification
- Kingdom: Animalia
- Phylum: Arthropoda
- Class: Insecta
- Order: Lepidoptera
- Family: Geometridae
- Genus: Dindica
- Species: D. virescens

Binomial name
- Dindica virescens (Butler, 1878)

Synonyms
- Bylazora virescens Butler, 1878; Pseudoterpna koreana Alphéraky, 1897; Dindica virescens yuwanina Kawazoe & Ogata, [1963]

Species of moth

Dindica virescens is a moth of the family Geometridae first described by Arthur Gardiner Butler in 1878. It is found in Japan.

The wingspan is 35–42 mm.

The larvae feed on Lindera species.
