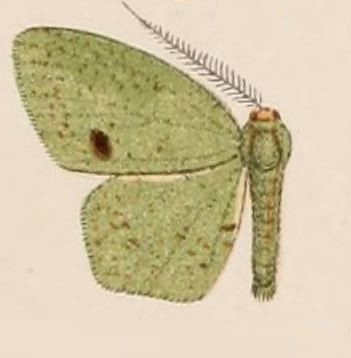

Scientific classification
- Kingdom: Animalia
- Phylum: Arthropoda
- Class: Insecta
- Order: Lepidoptera
- Family: Geometridae
- Genus: Heterolocha
- Species: H. hypoleuca

Binomial name
- Heterolocha hypoleuca (Hampson, 1907)

Synonyms
- Hypochrosis hypoleuca Hampson, 1907

= Heterolocha hypoleuca =

Species of moth

Heterolocha hypoleuca is a species of moth in the family Geometridae first described by George Hampson in 1907. It is found in India.
