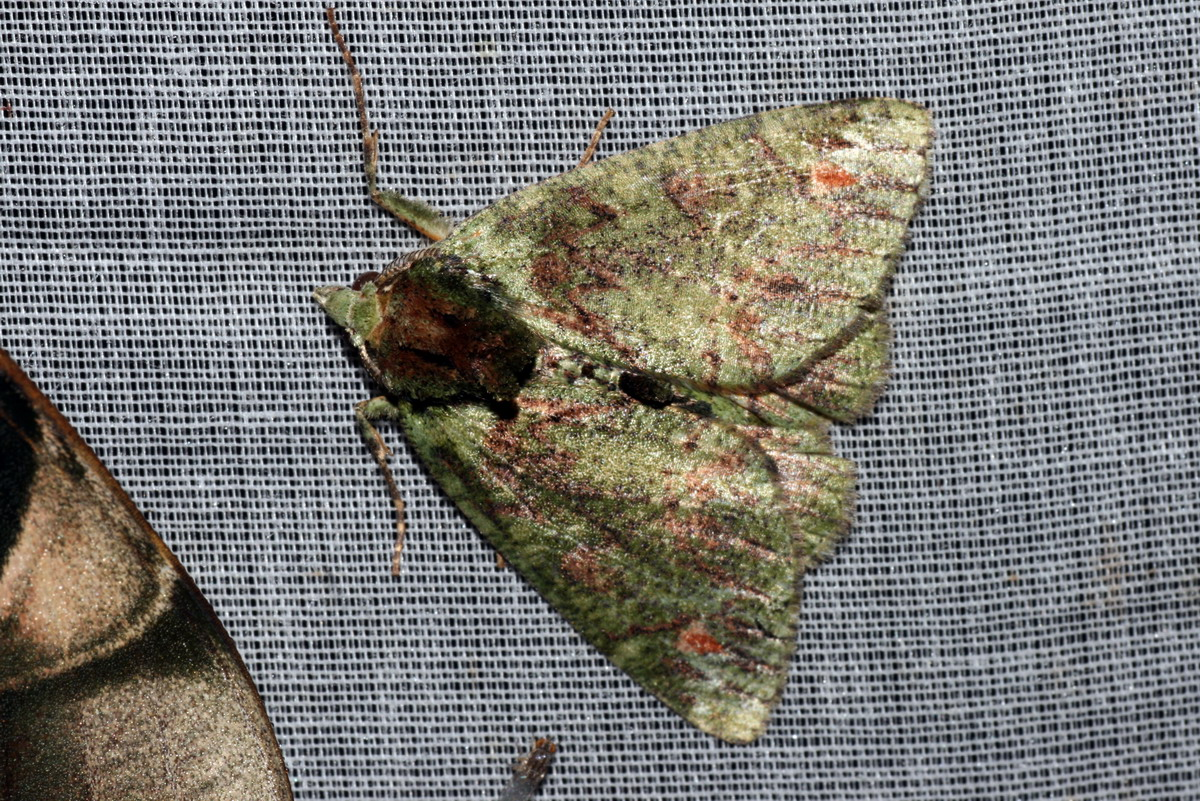

Scientific classification
- Kingdom: Animalia
- Phylum: Arthropoda
- Class: Insecta
- Order: Lepidoptera
- Family: Geometridae
- Genus: Dindica
- Species: D. olivacea

Binomial name
- Dindica olivacea Inoue, 1990

= Dindica olivacea =

Species of moth

Dindica olivacea is a moth of the family Geometridae first described by Hiroshi Inoue in 1990. It is found in the north-eastern Himalayas, south-eastern Asia, as well as on Borneo, Sumatra and the Philippines. The habitat consists of lowland forests.
