= Dindica wytsmani =

Scientific classification
- Kingdom: Animalia
- Phylum: Arthropoda
- Class: Insecta
- Order: Lepidoptera
- Family: Geometridae
- Genus: Dindica
- Species: D. wytsmani

Binomial name
- Dindica wytsmani L. B. Prout, 1927

Species of moth

Dindica wytsmani is a moth of the family Geometridae first described by Louis Beethoven Prout in 1927. It is found in Sikkim, India.
