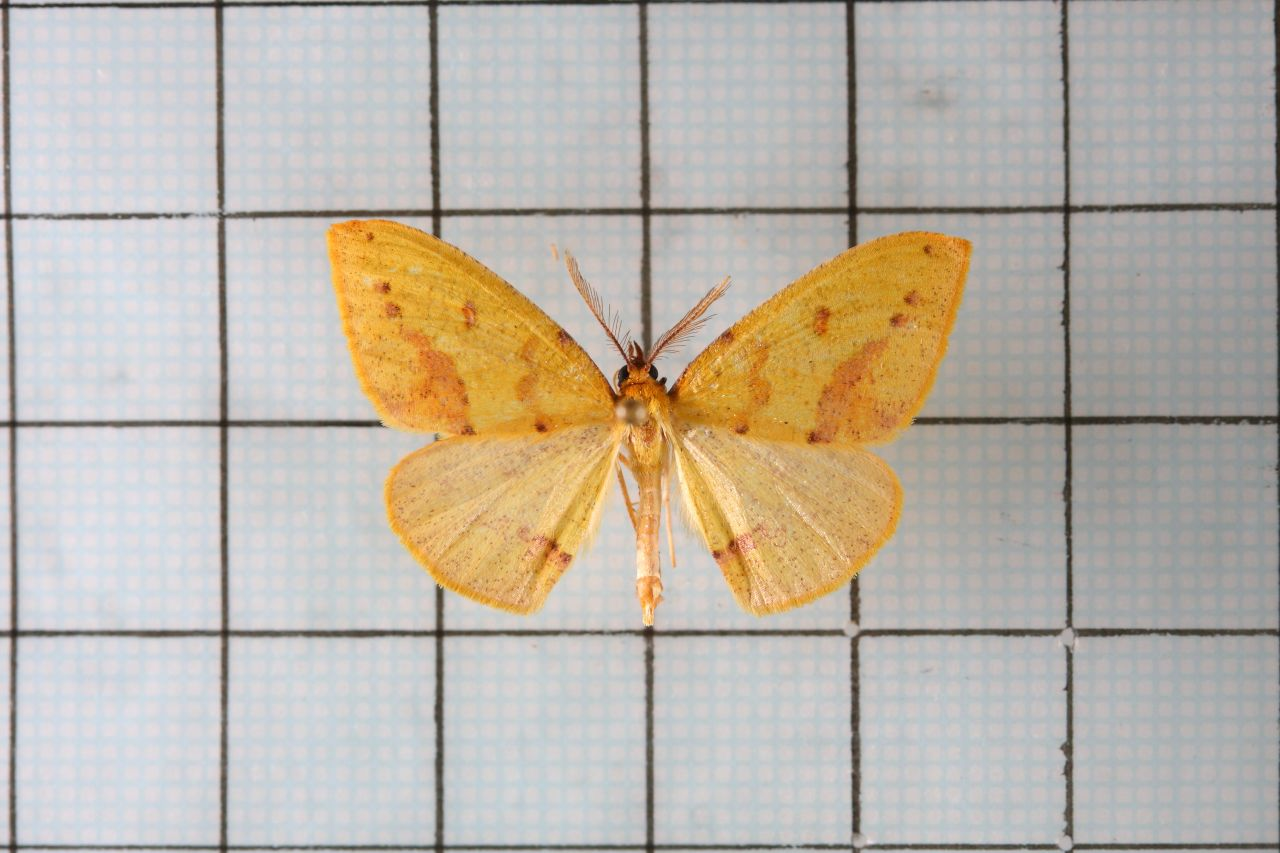

Scientific classification
- Domain: Eukaryota
- Kingdom: Animalia
- Phylum: Arthropoda
- Class: Insecta
- Order: Lepidoptera
- Family: Geometridae
- Genus: Heterolocha
- Species: H. arizana

Binomial name
- Heterolocha arizana Wileman, 1910

= Heterolocha arizana =

Species of moth

Heterolocha arizana is a species of moth in the family Geometridae. It is found in Taiwan.
