= Dindica hepatica =

Scientific classification
- Kingdom: Animalia
- Phylum: Arthropoda
- Class: Insecta
- Order: Lepidoptera
- Family: Geometridae
- Genus: Dindica
- Species: D. hepatica

Binomial name
- Dindica hepatica Inoue, 1990

Species of moth

Dindica hepatica is a moth of the family Geometridae first described by Hiroshi Inoue in 1990. It is found in China.
