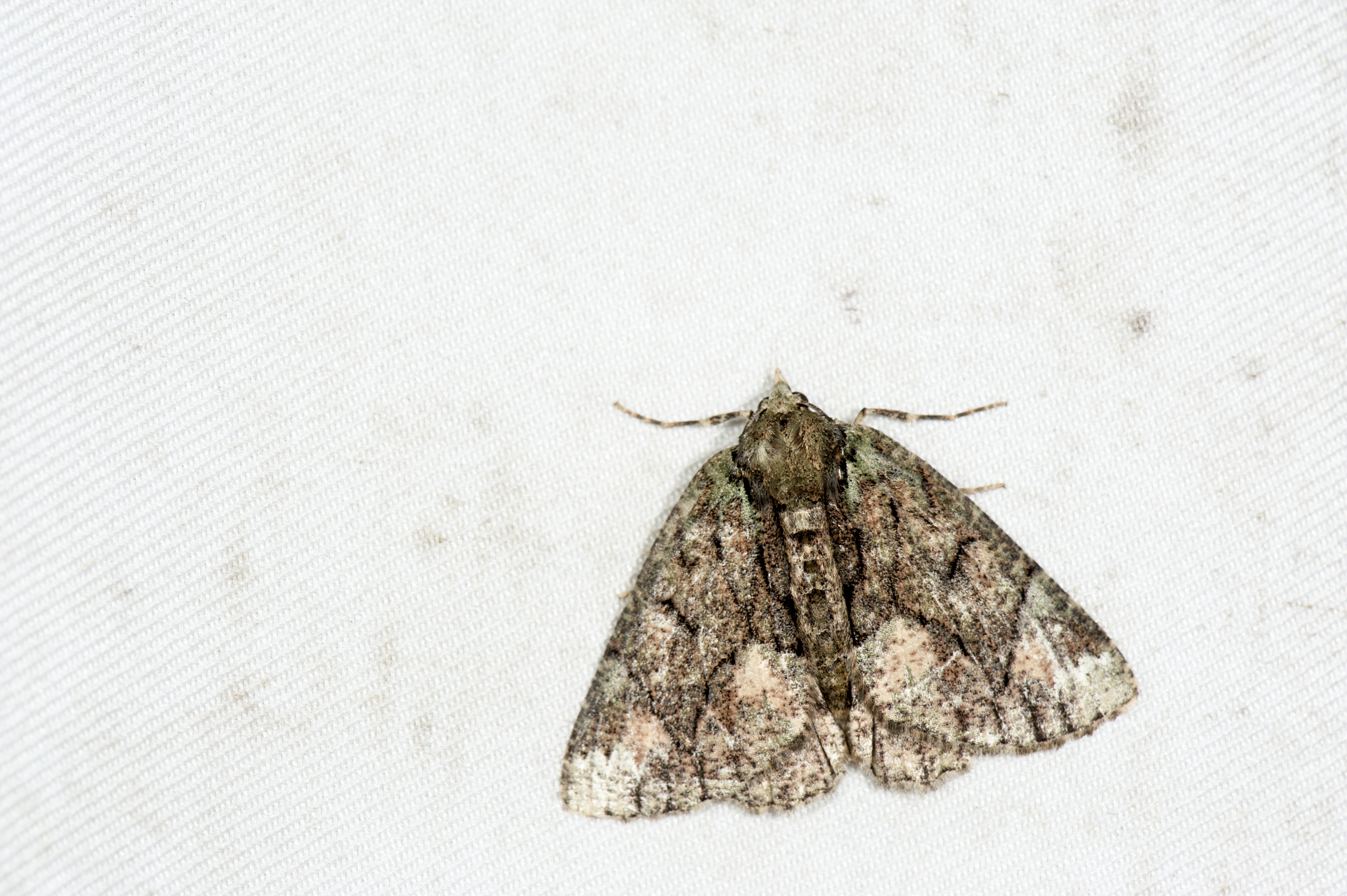

Scientific classification
- Kingdom: Animalia
- Phylum: Arthropoda
- Class: Insecta
- Order: Lepidoptera
- Family: Geometridae
- Genus: Dindica
- Species: D. wilemani

Binomial name
- Dindica wilemani L. B. Prout, 1927

= Dindica wilemani =

Species of moth

Dindica wilemani is a moth of the family Geometridae first described by Louis Beethoven Prout in 1927. It is found in Taiwan.
