= Dindica owadai =

Scientific classification
- Kingdom: Animalia
- Phylum: Arthropoda
- Class: Insecta
- Order: Lepidoptera
- Family: Geometridae
- Genus: Dindica
- Species: D. owadai

Binomial name
- Dindica owadai Inoue, 1990

Species of moth

Dindica owadai is a moth of the family Geometridae first described by Hiroshi Inoue in 1990. It is found in the Philippines.
