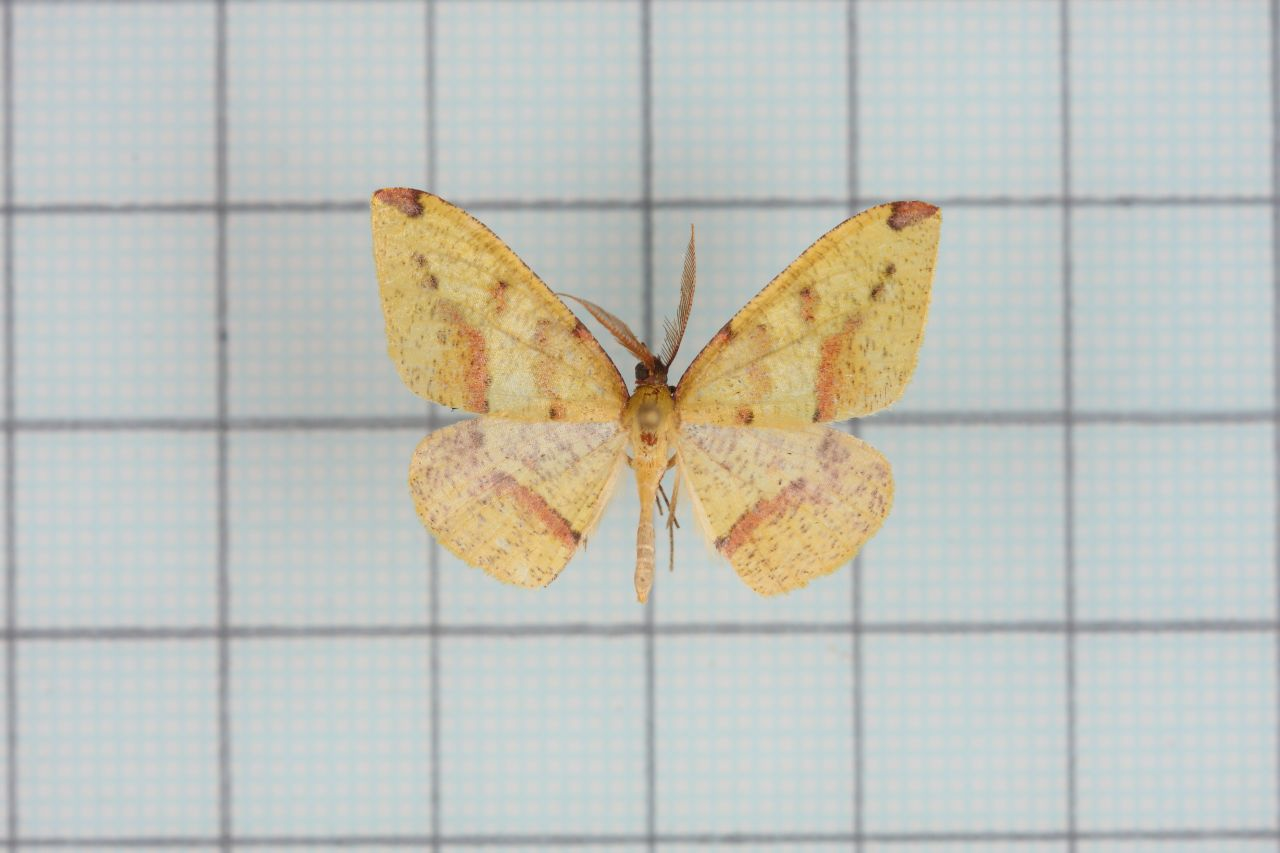

Scientific classification
- Kingdom: Animalia
- Phylum: Arthropoda
- Class: Insecta
- Order: Lepidoptera
- Family: Geometridae
- Genus: Heterolocha
- Species: H. coccinea

Binomial name
- Heterolocha coccinea Inoue, 1976

= Heterolocha coccinea =

Species of moth

Heterolocha coccinea is a species of moth in the family Geometridae first described by Hiroshi Inoue in 1976. It is found in Taiwan.

The wingspan is 23–29 mm.
