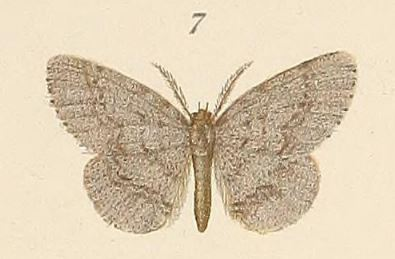

Scientific classification
- Domain: Eukaryota
- Kingdom: Animalia
- Phylum: Arthropoda
- Class: Insecta
- Order: Lepidoptera
- Family: Geometridae
- Genus: Hypochrosis
- Species: H. suffusata

Binomial name
- Hypochrosis suffusata Pagenstecher, 1907

= Hypochrosis suffusata =

Species of moth

Hypochrosis suffusata is a moth of the family Geometridae first described by Arnold Pagenstecher in 1907. It is found in south western Madagascar.

It has a wingspan of 28 mm.
