= Hypochrosis chlorozonaria =

Scientific classification
- Kingdom: Animalia
- Phylum: Arthropoda
- Class: Insecta
- Order: Lepidoptera
- Family: Geometridae
- Genus: Hypochrosis
- Species: H. chlorozonaria

Binomial name
- Hypochrosis chlorozonaria (Walker, 1860)

Synonyms
- Capasa chlorozonaria Walker, 1860; Marcala sulphurensis Moore, [1887]

Species of moth

Hypochrosis chlorozonaria is a moth of the family Geometridae first described by Francis Walker in 1860. It is found in Sri Lanka.
