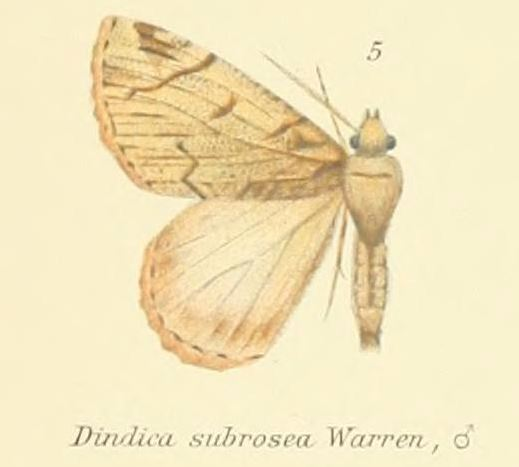

Scientific classification
- Kingdom: Animalia
- Phylum: Arthropoda
- Class: Insecta
- Order: Lepidoptera
- Family: Geometridae
- Genus: Dindica
- Species: D. subrosea

Binomial name
- Dindica subrosea (Warren, 1893)

Synonyms
- Perissolophia subrosea Warren, 1893; Perissolophia subsimilis Warren, 1898

= Dindica subrosea =

Species of moth

Dindica subrosea is a moth of the family Geometridae first described by William Warren in 1893. It is found in Sikkim, India.
