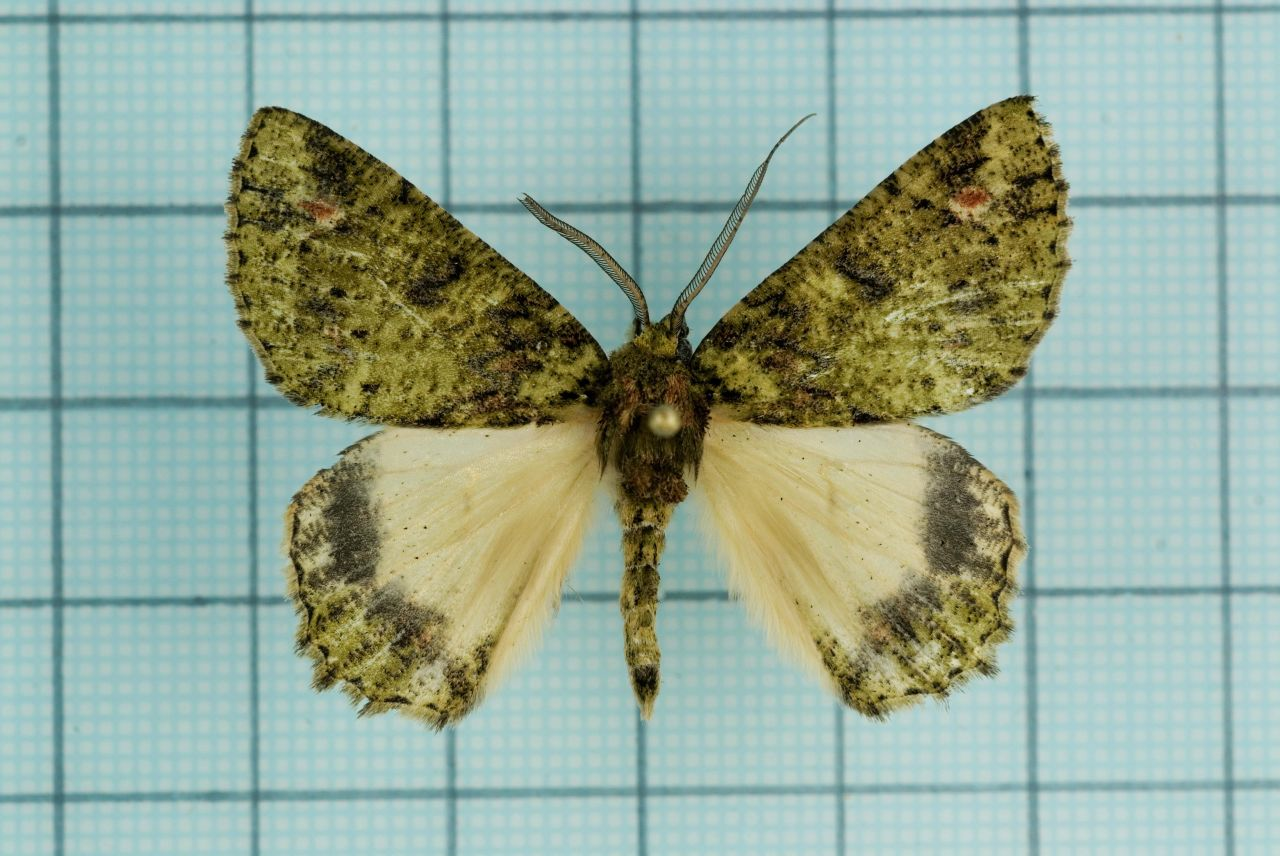

Scientific classification
- Kingdom: Animalia
- Phylum: Arthropoda
- Class: Insecta
- Order: Lepidoptera
- Family: Geometridae
- Genus: Dindica
- Species: D. taiwana

Binomial name
- Dindica taiwana Wileman, 1914

= Dindica taiwana =

Species of moth

Dindica taiwana is a moth of the family Geometridae. It is found in Taiwan.

The wingspan is 45–57 mm.
