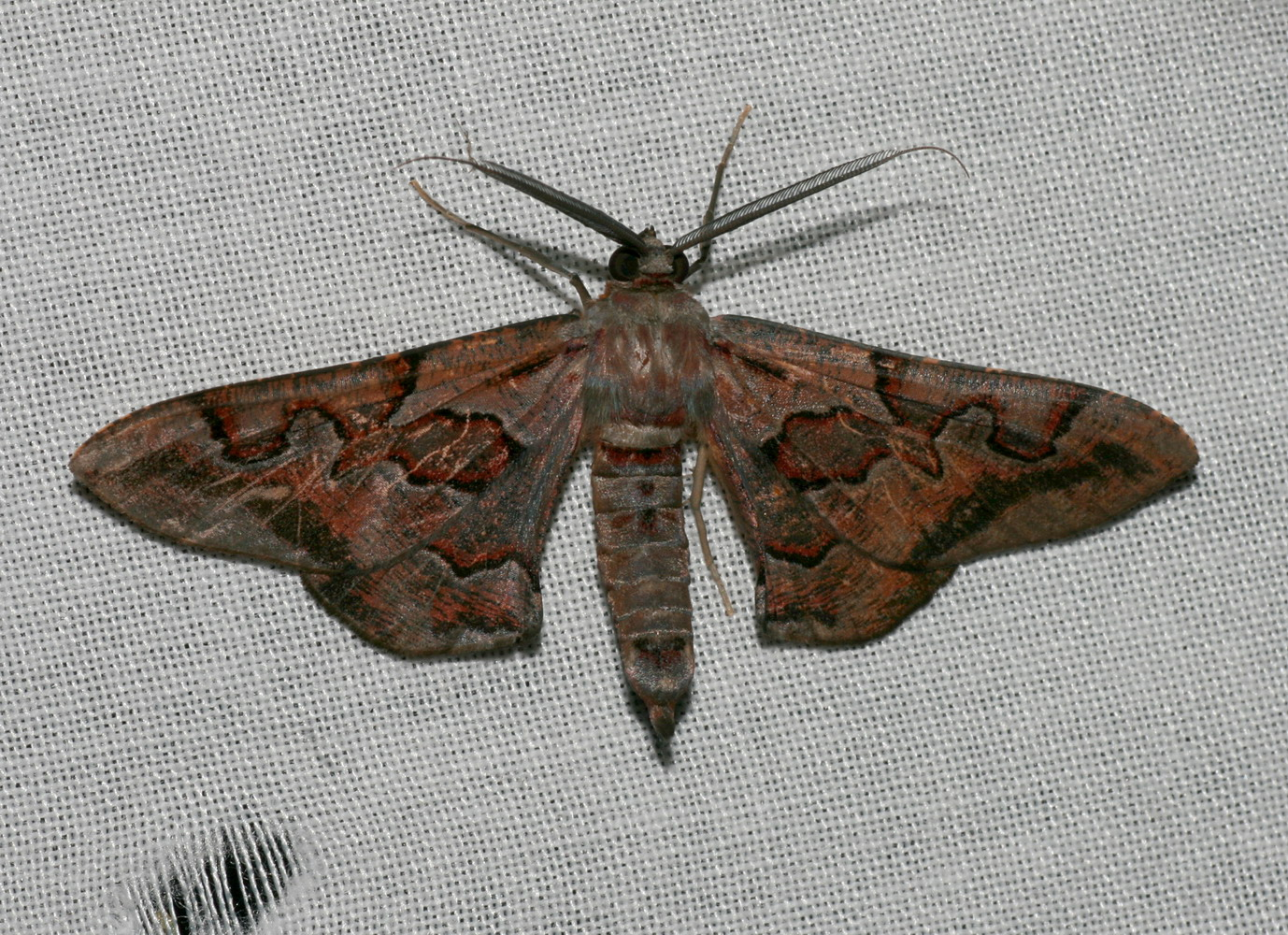
- Hypochrosis binexata

Scientific classification
- Kingdom: Animalia
- Phylum: Arthropoda
- Clade: Pancrustacea
- Class: Insecta
- Order: Lepidoptera
- Family: Geometridae
- Subfamily: Ennominae
- Genus: Hypochrosis; Guenée in Boisduval & Guenée, 1857

Synonyms
- Marcala Walker, [1863]; Patruissa Walker, [1863]; Phoenix Butler, 1880

= Hypochrosis =

Genus of moths

Hypochrosis is a genus of moths in the family Geometridae. It was erected by Achille Guenée in 1857.

== Description ==
Palpi usually not reaching beyond frons. Antennae bipectinate (comb like on both sides) in both sexes, the branches in the male longer than in the female. Claspers of the male very large. Foreleg with the process reaching beyond end of tibia and non-dilated hind tibia. Forewings with arched costa towards apex. Vein 3 from before angle of cell and veins 7, 8 and 9 stalked from before upper angle. Veins 10 and 11 stalked, where vein 11 being joined by a bar to vein 12, and sometimes vein 10 connected with veins 8 and 9. Hindwings with vein 3 from before angle of cell.

== Species ==
- Hypochrosis abstractaria Walker, [1863]
- Hypochrosis albodecorata Swinhoe, 1902
- Hypochrosis banakaria Plötz, 1880
- Hypochrosis binexata (Walker, [1863])
- Hypochrosis chlorozonaria Walker, 1860
- Hypochrosis cryptopyrrhata (Walker, [1863])
- Hypochrosis euphyes Prout, 1915
- Hypochrosis flavifusata
- Hypochrosis hyadaria Guenée, 1857
- Hypochrosis iris (Butler, 1880)
- Hypochrosis irrorata
- Hypochrosis praeaurata Prout, 1928
- Hypochrosis pyrrhophaeata (Walker, [1863])
- Hypochrosis rufescens (Butler, 1880)
- Hypochrosis sternaria Guenée, 1857
- Hypochrosis subrufa (Bastelberger, 1908)
- Hypochrosis suffusata Pagenstecher, 1907
- Hypochrosis waterstradti Holloway, 1976
