= Dindica semipallens =

Scientific classification
- Kingdom: Animalia
- Phylum: Arthropoda
- Class: Insecta
- Order: Lepidoptera
- Family: Geometridae
- Genus: Dindica
- Species: D. semipallens

Binomial name
- Dindica semipallens Inoue, 1990

Species of moth

Dindica semipallens is a moth of the family Geometridae first described by Hiroshi Inoue in 1990. It is found on Flores in the Lesser Sunda Islands of Indonesia.
