= Dindica para =

Scientific classification
- Kingdom: Animalia
- Phylum: Arthropoda
- Class: Insecta
- Order: Lepidoptera
- Family: Geometridae
- Genus: Dindica
- Species: D. para

Binomial name
- Dindica para C. Swinhoe, 1891

Synonyms
- Dindica erythropunctura Chu, 1981

Species of moth

Dindica para is a moth of the family Geometridae first described by Charles Swinhoe in 1891. It is found in India, Malaysia and China.

== Subspecies ==
- Dindica para para C. Swinhoe, 1891 (India, China)
- Dindica para malayana Inoue, 1990 (Malaysia)
