= Dindica discordia =

Scientific classification
- Kingdom: Animalia
- Phylum: Arthropoda
- Class: Insecta
- Order: Lepidoptera
- Family: Geometridae
- Genus: Dindica
- Species: D. discordia

Binomial name
- Dindica discordia Inoue, 1990

Species of moth

Dindica discordia is a moth of the family Geometridae first described by Hiroshi Inoue in 1990. It is found on Luzon and Palawan in the Philippines and on Sumatra in Indonesia.
