= Dindica sundae =

Scientific classification
- Kingdom: Animalia
- Phylum: Arthropoda
- Class: Insecta
- Order: Lepidoptera
- Family: Geometridae
- Genus: Dindica
- Species: D. sundae

Binomial name
- Dindica sundae L. B. Prout, 1935

Species of moth

Dindica sundae is a moth of the family Geometridae first described by Louis Beethoven Prout in 1935. It is found on Java and Bali.
