= Dindica pallens =

Scientific classification
- Kingdom: Animalia
- Phylum: Arthropoda
- Class: Insecta
- Order: Lepidoptera
- Family: Geometridae
- Genus: Dindica
- Species: D. pallens

Binomial name
- Dindica pallens Inoue, 1990

Species of moth

Dindica pallens is a moth of the family Geometridae first described by Hiroshi Inoue in 1990. It is found on the Philippines.
