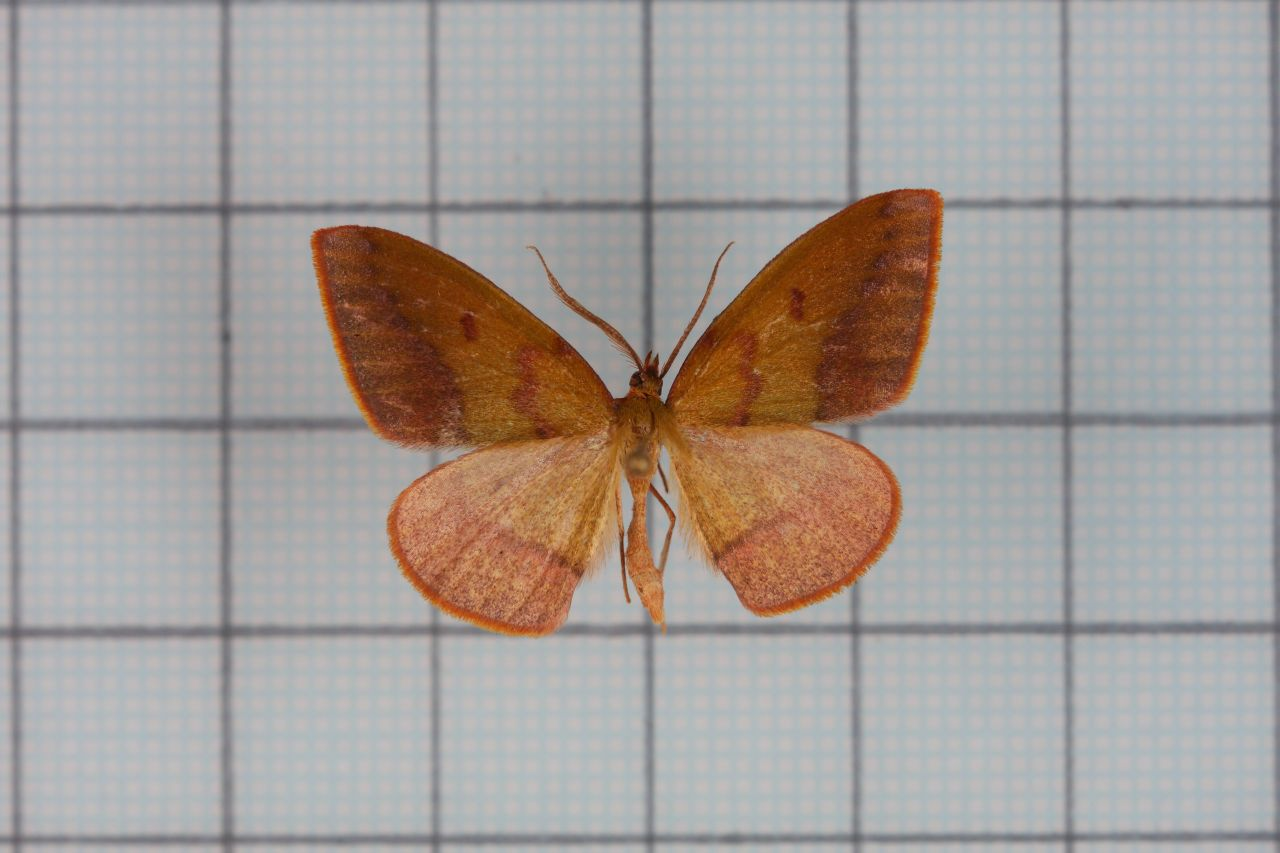
- Heterolocha marginata

Scientific classification
- Kingdom: Animalia
- Phylum: Arthropoda
- Clade: Pancrustacea
- Class: Insecta
- Order: Lepidoptera
- Family: Geometridae
- Genus: Heterolocha; Lederer, 1853

= Heterolocha =

Genus of moths

Heterolocha is a genus of moths in the family Geometridae (geometer moths).

== Taxonomy ==
The genus was described in 1853 by Julius Lederer, an Austrian entomologist who specializes in the study of lepidoterans.

=== Species ===
The genus contains numerous species. They are listed below:

- Heterolocha aristonaria (Walker, 1860)
- Heterolocha arizana Wileman, 1910
- Heterolocha biplagiata Bastelberger, 1909
- Heterolocha coccinea Inoue, 1976
- Heterolocha declinata Prout, 1928
- Heterolocha falconaria (Walker, 1866)
- Heterolocha hypoleuca Hampson, 1907
- Heterolocha laminaria (Herrich-Schäffer, [1852])
- Heterolocha lilacina (Bastelberger, 1909)
- Heterolocha lonicerae Prout, 1926
- Heterolocha marginata Wileman, 1910
- Heterolocha patalata Felder & Rogenhofer, 1875
- Heterolocha phoenicotaeniata (Kollar, 1844)
- Heterolocha polymorpha West, 1929
- Heterolocha polymorphoides Holloway, 1993
- Heterolocha pyreniata (Walker, 1866)
- Heterolocha sabulosa (Bastelberger, 1909)
- Heterolocha stulta (Butler, 1879)
- Heterolocha subroseata Warren, 1894
- Heterolocha taiwana Wileman, 1910
