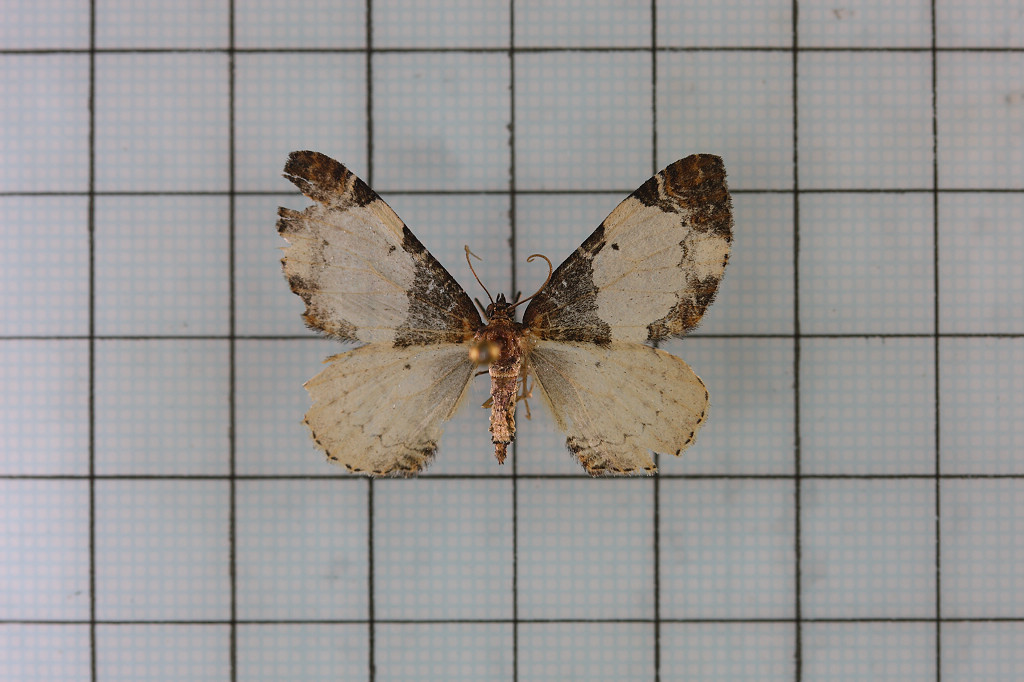
- Protonebula altera

Scientific classification
- Kingdom: Animalia
- Phylum: Arthropoda
- Class: Insecta
- Order: Lepidoptera
- Family: Geometridae
- Subfamily: Larentiinae
- Genus: Protonebula; Inoue, 1986

= Protonebula =

Genus of moths

Protonebula is a genus of moths in the family Geometridae.

== Species ==
- Protonebula altera (Bastelberger, 1911)
- Protonebula combusta (Swinhoe, 1894)
- Protonebula cupreata (Moore, 1868)
- Protonebula egregia Inoue, 1986
- Protonebula tripunctaria (Leech, 1897)
- Protonebula umbrifera (Butler, 1879)
