= Dindica glaucescens =

Scientific classification
- Kingdom: Animalia
- Phylum: Arthropoda
- Class: Insecta
- Order: Lepidoptera
- Family: Geometridae
- Genus: Dindica
- Species: D. glaucescens

Binomial name
- Dindica glaucescens Inoue, 1990

Species of moth

Dindica glaucescens is a moth of the family Geometridae first described by Hiroshi Inoue in 1990. It is found in Hunan, China.
