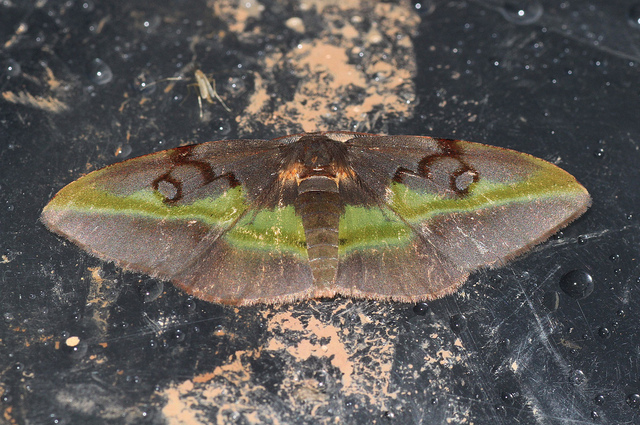
- From Borneo hill dipterocarp forest

Scientific classification
- Kingdom: Animalia
- Phylum: Arthropoda
- Class: Insecta
- Order: Lepidoptera
- Family: Geometridae
- Genus: Hypochrosis
- Species: H. cryptopyrrhata

Binomial name
- Hypochrosis cryptopyrrhata (Walker, [1863])

Synonyms
- Fascellina cryptopyrrhata Walker, [1863]; Omiza sublimbaria Warren, 1897

= Hypochrosis cryptopyrrhata =

Species of moth

Hypochrosis cryptopyrrhata is a geometer moth in the subfamily Ennominae first described by Francis Walker in 1863. The species can be found in lowland and lower montane forests in Borneo and Sumatra.

The larvae feed on Paraserianthes falcataria (= Falcataria moluccana).
