= Dindica tienmuensis =

Scientific classification
- Kingdom: Animalia
- Phylum: Arthropoda
- Class: Insecta
- Order: Lepidoptera
- Family: Geometridae
- Genus: Dindica
- Species: D. tienmuensis

Binomial name
- Dindica tienmuensis Chu, 1981

Species of moth

Dindica tienmuensis is a moth of the family Geometridae first described by Chu in 1981. It is found in Zhejiang, China.
