= Max Bastelberger =

Max Joseph Bastelberger (19 March 1851, Würzburg, Bavaria – 1 January 1916, Munich, Bavaria) was a German medical doctor and entomologist. He was specialized on geometrid moths and described 351 new taxa.

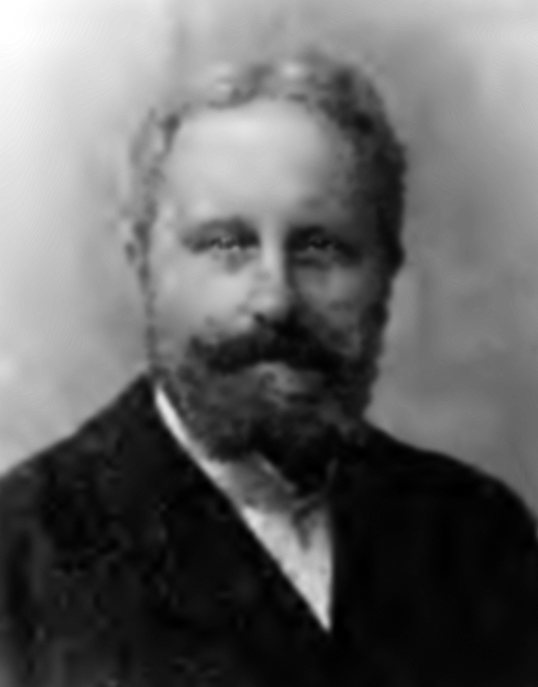
Max Bastelberger (1851-1916)

Species named in his honor include

- Alcis bastelbergeri
- Entephria bastelbergeri
- Dysphania bastelbergeri
- Eupithecia bastelbergeri
- Zamarada bastelbergeri

== Publications ==
- Max Bastelberger, 1905. Beschreibung neuer und Besprechung weniger bekannter Geometriden aus meiner Sammlung. - Entomologische Zeitschrift 19(14 (1. Suppl.)):77.
- Max Bastelberger, 1907. Neue afrikanische Geometriden aus meiner Sammlung. - Internationale Entomologische Zeitschrift, Guben 1:109, 119–120, 135–136, 157, 167–168.
- Max Bastelberger: Weitre Neubeschreibungen exotischer Geometriden in meiner Sammlung. Jahrbücher des Nassauischen Vereins für Naturkunde, 61: 78-87, Wiesbaden 1908.
- Max Bastelberger: Besprechung und Beschreibung einiger neuer oder sonst interessanter Arten von exotischen Geometriden im Naturhistorischen Museum zu Wiesbaden. Jahrbücher des Nassauischen Vereins für Naturkunde, 61: 72-77, Wiesbaden 1908
- Max Bastelberger: Beschreibung neuer exotischer Geometriden aus meiner Sammlung. Entomologische Zeitschrift, 22: 158-159, Stuttgart 1908.
