= Eupithecia discolor =

Scientific classification
- Kingdom: Animalia
- Phylum: Arthropoda
- Clade: Pancrustacea
- Class: Insecta
- Order: Lepidoptera
- Family: Geometridae
- Genus: Eupithecia
- Species: E. discolor

Binomial name
- Eupithecia discolor Vojnits, 1983

Species of moth

Eupithecia discolor is a moth in the family Geometridae. It is found in Nepal.

== Taxonomy ==
Inoue synonymised this species with Eupithecia rubridorsata in 2000. Further research concluded that it is in fact a good species.
