= Eupithecia particeps =

Scientific classification
- Kingdom: Animalia
- Phylum: Arthropoda
- Clade: Pancrustacea
- Class: Insecta
- Order: Lepidoptera
- Family: Geometridae
- Genus: Eupithecia
- Species: E. particeps

Binomial name
- Eupithecia particeps Vojnits, 1988

Synonyms
- Eupithecia orba Mironov & Galsworthy, 2004

Species of moth

Eupithecia particeps is a moth in the family Geometridae. It is found in Nepal, Pakistan, and Tibet (China).

== Taxonomy ==
It was formerly listed as a synonym of Eupithecia lobbichlerata, but reinstated as a species in 2008.

== Description ==
The wingspan is about 16 mm. The fore- and hindwings are pale buff.
