= Eupithecia egena =

Scientific classification
- Kingdom: Animalia
- Phylum: Arthropoda
- Clade: Pancrustacea
- Class: Insecta
- Order: Lepidoptera
- Family: Geometridae
- Genus: Eupithecia
- Species: E. egena

Binomial name
- Eupithecia egena Vojnits, 1984

Synonyms
- Eupithecia anteacta Vojnits, 1984; Eupithecia ficta Vojnits, 1984; Eupithecia seminuda Vojnits, 1984; Eupithecia sublasciva Vojnits, 1984

Species of moth

Eupithecia egena is a moth in the family Geometridae. It is found in China, India and Nepal. The species flies from mid-July to mid-September at an altitude between 1800 and 4000 meters above sea level.

Adults have grey-brown forewings and off-white hindwings. It resembles Eupithecia lasciva, but is larger. In addition, Eupithecia lasciva has an ochreous red patch in the distal area of the forewing and indistinct transverse lines, whereas in Eupithecia egena, the transverse lines are much more distinct and the red patch is smaller or entirely absent.
