= Eupithecia vivida =

Scientific classification
- Kingdom: Animalia
- Phylum: Arthropoda
- Clade: Pancrustacea
- Class: Insecta
- Order: Lepidoptera
- Family: Geometridae
- Genus: Eupithecia
- Species: E. vivida

Binomial name
- Eupithecia vivida Vojnits & De Laever, 1978

Synonyms
- Eupithecia producta Vojnits, 1981 (preocc. Eupithecia producta Bastelberger, 1911); Eupithecia wolfi Vojnits, 1985

Species of moth

Eupithecia vivida is a moth in the family Geometridae. It is found in Southwestern China (Yunnan, Tibet), northern India, and Afghanistan. It has two or three generations per year.
