= Eupithecia improba =

Scientific classification
- Kingdom: Animalia
- Phylum: Arthropoda
- Clade: Pancrustacea
- Class: Insecta
- Order: Lepidoptera
- Family: Geometridae
- Genus: Eupithecia
- Species: E. improba

Binomial name
- Eupithecia improba Vojnits, 1983

Species of moth

Eupithecia improba is a moth in the family Geometridae. It was first described by András Mátyás Vojnits in 1983. It is found in Nepal at elevations of 2,750–3,900 m (9,020–12,800 ft).

The wingspan is 19–21 mm (0.75–0.83 in) in males.
