= Eupithecia coniurata =

Scientific classification
- Kingdom: Animalia
- Phylum: Arthropoda
- Clade: Pancrustacea
- Class: Insecta
- Order: Lepidoptera
- Family: Geometridae
- Genus: Eupithecia
- Species: E. coniurata

Binomial name
- Eupithecia coniurata Vojnits, 1979

Species of moth

Eupithecia coniurata is a moth in the family Geometridae. It is found in China (Yunnan).
