= Eupithecia percuriosa =

Scientific classification
- Kingdom: Animalia
- Phylum: Arthropoda
- Clade: Pancrustacea
- Class: Insecta
- Order: Lepidoptera
- Family: Geometridae
- Genus: Eupithecia
- Species: E. percuriosa

Binomial name
- Eupithecia percuriosa Vojnits, 1994

Species of moth

Eupithecia percuriosa is a moth in the family Geometridae. It is found in South America.
