= Eupithecia meridiana =

Scientific classification
- Kingdom: Animalia
- Phylum: Arthropoda
- Clade: Pancrustacea
- Class: Insecta
- Order: Lepidoptera
- Family: Geometridae
- Genus: Eupithecia
- Species: E. meridiana

Binomial name
- Eupithecia meridiana Vojnits, 1994

Species of moth

Eupithecia meridiana is a moth in the family Geometridae. It is found in Chile (Aconcagua).

Adults of Eupithecia meridiana have sexual size differences and are characterized by their specific wing pattern.

The length of the forewings is about 10 mm for males and 11 mm for females. Adults are on wing in December.

== Etymology ==
The specific name is derived from meridianus (meaning southern).
