= Eupithecia cana =

Scientific classification
- Kingdom: Animalia
- Phylum: Arthropoda
- Clade: Pancrustacea
- Class: Insecta
- Order: Lepidoptera
- Family: Geometridae
- Genus: Eupithecia
- Species: E. cana

Binomial name
- Eupithecia cana Vojnits, 1994

Species of moth

Eupithecia cana is a moth in the family Geometridae. It is found in Chile (Coquimbo province).

The length of the forewings is 7.5–9 mm. Adults are on wing in November and December.

== Etymology ==
The specific name is derived from canus (meaning greyish white).
