= Eupithecia sacrosancta =

Scientific classification
- Kingdom: Animalia
- Phylum: Arthropoda
- Clade: Pancrustacea
- Class: Insecta
- Order: Lepidoptera
- Family: Geometridae
- Genus: Eupithecia
- Species: E. sacrosancta

Binomial name
- Eupithecia sacrosancta Vojnits, 1979

Species of moth

Eupithecia sacrosancta is a moth in the family Geometridae. It is found in Shaanxi, China.

The wingspan is about 19 mm (0.75 in) for males.
