= Eupithecia caduca =

Scientific classification
- Kingdom: Animalia
- Phylum: Arthropoda
- Clade: Pancrustacea
- Class: Insecta
- Order: Lepidoptera
- Family: Geometridae
- Genus: Eupithecia
- Species: E. caduca

Binomial name
- Eupithecia caduca Vojnits, 1984

Species of moth

Eupithecia caduca is a moth in the family Geometridae. It is found in China.
