= Eupithecia inveterata =

Scientific classification
- Kingdom: Animalia
- Phylum: Arthropoda
- Clade: Pancrustacea
- Class: Insecta
- Order: Lepidoptera
- Family: Geometridae
- Genus: Eupithecia
- Species: E. inveterata

Binomial name
- Eupithecia inveterata Vojnits, 1987

Synonyms
- Eupithecia trita Vojnits, 1977 (preocc.)

Species of moth

Eupithecia inveterata is a moth in the family Geometridae. It is found in Mongolia.
