= Eupithecia myoma =

Scientific classification
- Kingdom: Animalia
- Phylum: Arthropoda
- Clade: Pancrustacea
- Class: Insecta
- Order: Lepidoptera
- Family: Geometridae
- Genus: Eupithecia
- Species: E. myoma

Binomial name
- Eupithecia myoma Vojnits, 1988

Species of moth

Eupithecia myoma is a moth in the family Geometridae. It is found in Kyrghizstan. It is one of the moth species first described by Vojnits in 1988.

The length of the forewings is 18–18.5 mm for males and 17–21 mm for females.
