= Eupithecia balintzsolti =

Scientific classification
- Kingdom: Animalia
- Phylum: Arthropoda
- Clade: Pancrustacea
- Class: Insecta
- Order: Lepidoptera
- Family: Geometridae
- Genus: Eupithecia
- Species: E. balintzsolti

Binomial name
- Eupithecia balintzsolti Vojnits, 1987

Species of moth

Eupithecia balintzsolti is a moth in the family Geometridae. It is found in Nepal, Laos and Thailand.
