= Eupithecia atacama =

Scientific classification
- Kingdom: Animalia
- Phylum: Arthropoda
- Clade: Pancrustacea
- Class: Insecta
- Order: Lepidoptera
- Family: Geometridae
- Genus: Eupithecia
- Species: E. atacama

Binomial name
- Eupithecia atacama (Vojnits, 1985)

Synonyms
- Heteropithecia atacama Vojnits, 1985

Species of moth

Eupithecia atacama is a moth in the family Geometridae. It is found in the regions of Antofagasta (Antofagasta Province) and Atacama (Huasco Province) in Chile. The habitat consists of the North Coast and Intermediate Desert Biotic Provinces.

The length of the forewings is about 8.5–9 mm for males and 8.5–10 mm for females. Adults have been recorded on wing in September, October and November.
