= Eupithecia maculosa =

Scientific classification
- Kingdom: Animalia
- Phylum: Arthropoda
- Clade: Pancrustacea
- Class: Insecta
- Order: Lepidoptera
- Family: Geometridae
- Genus: Eupithecia
- Species: E. maculosa

Binomial name
- Eupithecia maculosa Vojnits, 1981

Synonyms
- Eupithecia flavitornata Herbulot, 1984

Species of moth

Eupithecia maculosa is a moth in the family Geometridae first described by András Mátyás Vojnits in 1981. It is found in Nepal, north-eastern India and Pakistan.
