= Eupithecia otiosa =

Scientific classification
- Kingdom: Animalia
- Phylum: Arthropoda
- Clade: Pancrustacea
- Class: Insecta
- Order: Lepidoptera
- Family: Geometridae
- Genus: Eupithecia
- Species: E. otiosa

Binomial name
- Eupithecia otiosa Vojnits, 1981

Species of moth

Eupithecia otiosa is a moth in the family Geometridae. It is found in Tibet.
