= Eupithecia emendata =

Scientific classification
- Kingdom: Animalia
- Phylum: Arthropoda
- Clade: Pancrustacea
- Class: Insecta
- Order: Lepidoptera
- Family: Geometridae
- Genus: Eupithecia
- Species: E. emendata

Binomial name
- Eupithecia emendata Vojnits, 1983

Species of moth

Eupithecia emendata is a moth in the family Geometridae. It was first described by András Mátyás Vojnits in 1983. It is found in Nepal at elevations of 2,750–3,500 m (9,020–11,480 ft).

The wingspan is 18 mm (0.71 in) in the holotype, a male, and 23 mm (0.91 in) in a female.
