= Eupithecia chapo =

Scientific classification
- Kingdom: Animalia
- Phylum: Arthropoda
- Clade: Pancrustacea
- Class: Insecta
- Order: Lepidoptera
- Family: Geometridae
- Genus: Eupithecia
- Species: E. chapo

Binomial name
- Eupithecia chapo Vojnits, 1992

Species of moth

Eupithecia chapo is a moth in the family Geometridae. It is found in Chile and/or Peru.
