= Eupithecia natalica =

Scientific classification
- Kingdom: Animalia
- Phylum: Arthropoda
- Clade: Pancrustacea
- Class: Insecta
- Order: Lepidoptera
- Family: Geometridae
- Genus: Eupithecia
- Species: E. natalica

Binomial name
- Eupithecia natalica Vojnits, 1994

Species of moth

Eupithecia natalica is a moth in the family Geometridae. It is found in South America.
