= Eupithecia matura =

Scientific classification
- Kingdom: Animalia
- Phylum: Arthropoda
- Clade: Pancrustacea
- Class: Insecta
- Order: Lepidoptera
- Family: Geometridae
- Genus: Eupithecia
- Species: E. matura

Binomial name
- Eupithecia matura Vojnits, 1981

Species of moth

Eupithecia matura is a moth in the family Geometridae. It is found in Nepal.
