= Eupithecia necessaria =

Scientific classification
- Kingdom: Animalia
- Phylum: Arthropoda
- Clade: Pancrustacea
- Class: Insecta
- Order: Lepidoptera
- Family: Geometridae
- Genus: Eupithecia
- Species: E. necessaria

Binomial name
- Eupithecia necessaria (Vojnits, 1977)

Synonyms
- Catarina necessaria Vojnits, 1977

Species of moth

Eupithecia necessaria is a moth in the family Geometridae. It is found in Mongolia.
