= Eupithecia omnigera =

Scientific classification
- Kingdom: Animalia
- Phylum: Arthropoda
- Clade: Pancrustacea
- Class: Insecta
- Order: Lepidoptera
- Family: Geometridae
- Genus: Eupithecia
- Species: E. omnigera

Binomial name
- Eupithecia omnigera Vojnits, 1982

Synonyms
- Eupithecia recentissima Vojnits, 1982

Species of moth

Eupithecia omnigera is a moth in the family Geometridae first described by András Mátyás Vojnits in 1982. It is found in the Pamir, Altai and Vantshu regions of central Asia.

The length of the forewings in males ranges between 17.5–26 mm and in females between 20–27 mm. There are two generations per year with adults on wing from April to June and again in July.
