= Eupithecia albuta =

Scientific classification
- Kingdom: Animalia
- Phylum: Arthropoda
- Clade: Pancrustacea
- Class: Insecta
- Order: Lepidoptera
- Family: Geometridae
- Genus: Eupithecia
- Species: E. albuta

Binomial name
- Eupithecia albuta Vojnits, 1992

Species of moth

Eupithecia albuta is a moth in the family Geometridae.
