= Eupithecia marmorea =

Scientific classification
- Kingdom: Animalia
- Phylum: Arthropoda
- Clade: Pancrustacea
- Class: Insecta
- Order: Lepidoptera
- Family: Geometridae
- Genus: Eupithecia
- Species: E. marmorea

Binomial name
- Eupithecia marmorea Vojnits, 1983

Species of moth

Eupithecia marmorea is a moth in the family Geometridae. It was first described by András Mátyás Vojnits in 1983. It is known from an elevation of about 3,100 m (10,200 ft) in Nepal.

The wingspan is 24 mm (0.94 in) in the female holotype.
