= Eupithecia hannemanni =

Scientific classification
- Kingdom: Animalia
- Phylum: Arthropoda
- Clade: Pancrustacea
- Class: Insecta
- Order: Lepidoptera
- Family: Geometridae
- Genus: Eupithecia
- Species: E. hannemanni

Binomial name
- Eupithecia hannemanni Vojnits & de Laever, 1973

Synonyms
- Eupithecia manca Vojnits, 1979

Species of moth

Eupithecia hannemanni is a moth in the family Geometridae. It is found in western China and north-western Pakistan.
