= Eupithecia dierli =

Scientific classification
- Kingdom: Animalia
- Phylum: Arthropoda
- Clade: Pancrustacea
- Class: Insecta
- Order: Lepidoptera
- Family: Geometridae
- Genus: Eupithecia
- Species: E. dierli

Binomial name
- Eupithecia dierli Vojnits, 1983

Species of moth

Eupithecia dierli is a moth in the family Geometridae. It was first described by András Mátyás Vojnits in 1983 and named after Wolfgang Dierl. It is found in Nepal at elevations of 1,600–2,600 m (5,200–8,500 ft).

The wingspan is 17–18 mm (0.67–0.71 in) in males and 18.5 mm (0.73 in) in a female.
