= Eupithecia falkneri =

Scientific classification
- Kingdom: Animalia
- Phylum: Arthropoda
- Clade: Pancrustacea
- Class: Insecta
- Order: Lepidoptera
- Family: Geometridae
- Genus: Eupithecia
- Species: E. falkneri

Binomial name
- Eupithecia falkneri Vojnits, 1978

Species of moth

Eupithecia falkneri is a moth in the family Geometridae. It is found in Algeria.
