= Eupithecia xanthomixta =

Scientific classification
- Kingdom: Animalia
- Phylum: Arthropoda
- Clade: Pancrustacea
- Class: Insecta
- Order: Lepidoptera
- Family: Geometridae
- Genus: Eupithecia
- Species: E. xanthomixta

Binomial name
- Eupithecia xanthomixta Vojnits, 1988

Species of moth

Eupithecia xanthomixta is a moth in the family Geometridae. It is found in Afghanistan and Iran.

== Subspecies ==
- Eupithecia xanthomixta xanthomixta
- Eupithecia xanthomixta derbendi Vojnits, 1988 (Iran)
