= Eupithecia procerissima =

Scientific classification
- Kingdom: Animalia
- Phylum: Arthropoda
- Clade: Pancrustacea
- Class: Insecta
- Order: Lepidoptera
- Family: Geometridae
- Genus: Eupithecia
- Species: E. procerissima

Binomial name
- Eupithecia procerissima Vojnits, 1994

Species of moth

Eupithecia procerissima is a moth in the family Geometridae. It is found in Chile (Santiago Province).

The length of the forewings is about 11.5 mm.
