= Eupithecia eszterkae =

Scientific classification
- Kingdom: Animalia
- Phylum: Arthropoda
- Clade: Pancrustacea
- Class: Insecta
- Order: Lepidoptera
- Family: Geometridae
- Genus: Eupithecia
- Species: E. eszterkae

Binomial name
- Eupithecia eszterkae Vojnits, 1976

Species of moth

Eupithecia eszterkae is a moth in the family Geometridae first described by András Mátyás Vojnits in 1976. It is found in Shaanxi, China.
