= Eupithecia pediba =

Scientific classification
- Kingdom: Animalia
- Phylum: Arthropoda
- Clade: Pancrustacea
- Class: Insecta
- Order: Lepidoptera
- Family: Geometridae
- Genus: Eupithecia
- Species: E. pediba

Binomial name
- Eupithecia pediba Vojnits, 1981

Synonyms
- Eupithecia epileptica Vojnits, 1984; Eupithecia acuminata Mironov & Galsworthy, 2004

Species of moth

Eupithecia pediba is a moth in the family Geometridae. It is found in eastern Tibet (Sichuan), and Yunnan, China. It occurs at a high altitude, between 4000 and 5000 meters above sea level, and is on wing from mid-June to mid-July.

The wingspan of females, based on the now-synonymized Eupithecia acuminata, is about 21 mm (0.83 in).
