= Eupithecia propagata =

Scientific classification
- Kingdom: Animalia
- Phylum: Arthropoda
- Clade: Pancrustacea
- Class: Insecta
- Order: Lepidoptera
- Family: Geometridae
- Genus: Eupithecia
- Species: E. propagata

Binomial name
- Eupithecia propagata L.B. Prout, 1926

Synonyms
- Eupithecia iracunda Vojnits, 1988; Eupithecia beneficiaria Vojnits, 1988; Eupithecia beneficaria Vojnits, 1988 (misspelling)

Species of moth

Eupithecia propagata is a moth in the family Geometridae. It is found in India, Nepal, Bhutan and China. It is on wing from late July to late October.

Adults have rusty brown forewings with a number of black and white markings, and off-white hindwings with a dark streak along the posterior edge and corner. It is smaller and darker than Eupithecia refertissima, which it otherwise resembles in outward appearance.
