= Eupithecia calientes =

Scientific classification
- Kingdom: Animalia
- Phylum: Arthropoda
- Clade: Pancrustacea
- Class: Insecta
- Order: Lepidoptera
- Family: Geometridae
- Genus: Eupithecia
- Species: E. calientes

Binomial name
- Eupithecia calientes Vojnits, 1992

Species of moth

Eupithecia calientes is a moth in the family Geometridae first described by András Mátyás Vojnits in 1992. It is found in Chile and/or Peru.
