= Eupithecia damnosa =

Scientific classification
- Kingdom: Animalia
- Phylum: Arthropoda
- Clade: Pancrustacea
- Class: Insecta
- Order: Lepidoptera
- Family: Geometridae
- Genus: Eupithecia
- Species: E. damnosa

Binomial name
- Eupithecia damnosa Vojnits, 1983

Species of moth

Eupithecia damnosa is a moth in the family Geometridae. It was first described by András Mátyás Vojnits in 1983. It is known from an elevation of 2,600 m (8,500 ft) in Nepal.

The wingspan is 19 mm (0.75 in) in the male holotype.
