= Eupithecia fervida =

Scientific classification
- Kingdom: Animalia
- Phylum: Arthropoda
- Clade: Pancrustacea
- Class: Insecta
- Order: Lepidoptera
- Family: Geometridae
- Genus: Eupithecia
- Species: E. fervida

Binomial name
- Eupithecia fervida Vojnits, 1984

Species of moth

Eupithecia fervida is a moth in the family Geometridae first described by András Mátyás Vojnits in 1984. It is found in China.
