= Eupithecia demissa =

Scientific classification
- Kingdom: Animalia
- Phylum: Arthropoda
- Clade: Pancrustacea
- Class: Insecta
- Order: Lepidoptera
- Family: Geometridae
- Genus: Eupithecia
- Species: E. demissa

Binomial name
- Eupithecia demissa Vojnits, 1994

Species of moth

Eupithecia demissa is a moth in the family Geometridae. It is found in Chile (Malleco Province).

The length of the forewings is about 7 mm. Adults are on wing in February.

== Etymology ==
The specific name is derived from demissus (meaning humble).
