= Eupithecia invicta =

Scientific classification
- Kingdom: Animalia
- Phylum: Arthropoda
- Clade: Pancrustacea
- Class: Insecta
- Order: Lepidoptera
- Family: Geometridae
- Genus: Eupithecia
- Species: E. invicta

Binomial name
- Eupithecia invicta Vojnits, 1981

Synonyms
- Eupithecia acuta Vojnits, 1983

Species of moth

Eupithecia invicta is a moth in the family Geometridae. It is found in Nepal, India (Kumaon, Meghalaya), China (Yunnan, Shanxi), Vietnam and Thailand.
