= Eupithecia impolita =

Scientific classification
- Kingdom: Animalia
- Phylum: Arthropoda
- Clade: Pancrustacea
- Class: Insecta
- Order: Lepidoptera
- Family: Geometridae
- Genus: Eupithecia
- Species: E. impolita

Binomial name
- Eupithecia impolita Vojnits, 1980

Species of moth

Eupithecia impolita is a moth in the family Geometridae. It is found in China (Shansi).
