= Eupithecia sublata =

Scientific classification
- Kingdom: Animalia
- Phylum: Arthropoda
- Clade: Pancrustacea
- Class: Insecta
- Order: Lepidoptera
- Family: Geometridae
- Genus: Eupithecia
- Species: E. sublata

Binomial name
- Eupithecia sublata Vojnits, 1994

Species of moth

Eupithecia sublata is a moth in the family Geometridae first described by András Mátyás Vojnits in 1994. It is found in Tanzania.
