= Eupithecia iterata =

Scientific classification
- Kingdom: Animalia
- Phylum: Arthropoda
- Clade: Pancrustacea
- Class: Insecta
- Order: Lepidoptera
- Family: Geometridae
- Genus: Eupithecia
- Species: E. iterata

Binomial name
- Eupithecia iterata Vojnits, 1980

Species of moth

Eupithecia iterata is a moth in the family Geometridae first described by András Mátyás Vojnits in 1980. It is found in Tibet.
