= Eupithecia cuneata =

Scientific classification
- Kingdom: Animalia
- Phylum: Arthropoda
- Clade: Pancrustacea
- Class: Insecta
- Order: Lepidoptera
- Family: Geometridae
- Genus: Eupithecia
- Species: E. cuneata

Binomial name
- Eupithecia cuneata Vojnits, 1984

Synonyms
- Eupithecia proba Mironov & Galsworthy, 2004

Species of moth

Eupithecia cuneata is a moth in the family Geometridae. It is found in China (Yunnan), Myanmar, and Thailand.

The wingspan of females, based on the now-synonymized Eupithecia proba, is about 17–18 mm (0.67–0.71 in).
