= Eupithecia proprivata =

Scientific classification
- Kingdom: Animalia
- Phylum: Arthropoda
- Clade: Pancrustacea
- Class: Insecta
- Order: Lepidoptera
- Family: Geometridae
- Genus: Eupithecia
- Species: E. proprivata

Binomial name
- Eupithecia proprivata Vojnits, 1982

Synonyms
- Eupithecia costisignata ab. privata Dietze, 1910

Species of moth

Eupithecia proprivata is a moth in the family Geometridae. It is found in central Asia.
