= Eupithecia dolosa =

Scientific classification
- Kingdom: Animalia
- Phylum: Arthropoda
- Clade: Pancrustacea
- Class: Insecta
- Order: Lepidoptera
- Family: Geometridae
- Genus: Eupithecia
- Species: E. dolosa

Binomial name
- Eupithecia dolosa (Vojnits, 1977)

Synonyms
- Catarina dolosa Vojnits, 1977

Species of moth

Eupithecia dolosa is a moth in the family Geometridae. It is found in Mongolia.
