= Eupithecia contraria =

Scientific classification
- Kingdom: Animalia
- Phylum: Arthropoda
- Clade: Pancrustacea
- Class: Insecta
- Order: Lepidoptera
- Family: Geometridae
- Genus: Eupithecia
- Species: E. contraria

Binomial name
- Eupithecia contraria Vojnits, 1983

Synonyms
- Eupithecia fuscoferruginea Inoue, 1987

Species of moth

Eupithecia contraria is a moth in the family Geometridae. It is found in Pakistan and Nepal.
