= Eupithecia hysterica =

Scientific classification
- Kingdom: Animalia
- Phylum: Arthropoda
- Clade: Pancrustacea
- Class: Insecta
- Order: Lepidoptera
- Family: Geometridae
- Genus: Eupithecia
- Species: E. hysterica

Binomial name
- Eupithecia hysterica Vojnits, 1988

Species of moth

Eupithecia hysterica is a moth in the family Geometridae. It is found in Tajikistan.

The length of the forewings is 21–23 mm for males and 24–26 mm for females.
