= Eupithecia lasciva =

Scientific classification
- Kingdom: Animalia
- Phylum: Arthropoda
- Clade: Pancrustacea
- Class: Insecta
- Order: Lepidoptera
- Family: Geometridae
- Genus: Eupithecia
- Species: E. lasciva

Binomial name
- Eupithecia lasciva Vojnits, 1980

Synonyms
- Eupithecia fragmentaria Vojnits, 1984; Eupithecia depressa Vojnits, 1984; Eupithecia depressa disiuncta Vojnits, 1984; Eupithecia benigna Vojnits, 1984

Species of moth

Eupithecia lasciva is a moth in the family Geometridae. It is found in China, where it is known from Tibet, Qinghai, Gansu, Shanxi, Shaanxi, Sichuan, and Yunnan. In Yunnan, specimens have been collected at altitudes up to ca. 4500 meters. Adults are on wing in April, and again from mid-June to mid-September.

Adults have somewhat narrowed, dark grey forewings with a small brown discal spot and an ochre or reddish-ochre patch below it, but which otherwise have mostly inconspicuous markings. Hindwings are off-white and darker near the inner margin and posterior corner.
