= Eupithecia lobbichlerata =

Scientific classification
- Domain: Eukaryota
- Kingdom: Animalia
- Phylum: Arthropoda
- Class: Insecta
- Order: Lepidoptera
- Family: Geometridae
- Genus: Eupithecia
- Species: E. lobbichlerata

Binomial name
- Eupithecia lobbichlerata Schutze, 1961

Species of moth

Eupithecia lobbichlerata is a moth in the family Geometridae. It is found in Nepal.
