= Eupithecia rubridorsata =

Scientific classification
- Kingdom: Animalia
- Phylum: Arthropoda
- Class: Insecta
- Order: Lepidoptera
- Family: Geometridae
- Genus: Eupithecia
- Species: E. rubridorsata

Binomial name
- Eupithecia rubridorsata Hampson, 1895

Synonyms
- Eupithecia acerba Vojnits, 1984; Eupithecia circumscriptrix Vojnits, 1983

Species of moth

Eupithecia rubridorsata is a moth in the family Geometridae. It is found in India (Sikkim), Nepal, and China.
