= András Mátyás Vojnits =

Hungarian naturalist and entomologist

- Born: 2 January 1941; Budapest, Hungary
- Died: 5 April 2021
- Known for: Research on moths, particularly the tribe Eupitheciini
- Scientific career
- Fields: Natural history, entomology
- Author abbrev. (zoology): Vojnits

András Mátyás Vojnits (2 January 1941 – 5 April 2021) was a Hungarian naturalist and entomologist.

== Biography ==
Vojnits was born in Budapest on 2 January 1941. He became a curator at the Hungarian Natural History Museum in 1965 and remained associated with the institution throughout his scientific career. His principal area of specialization was the study of moths, particularly members of the Eupitheciini, a tribe within the family Geometridae.

Vojnits described a number of zoological taxa, and the author abbreviation Vojnits is used to indicate him as the author of scientific names in zoological nomenclature.

He died on 5 April 2021.

== See also ==
- Taxa named by András Mátyás Vojnits
