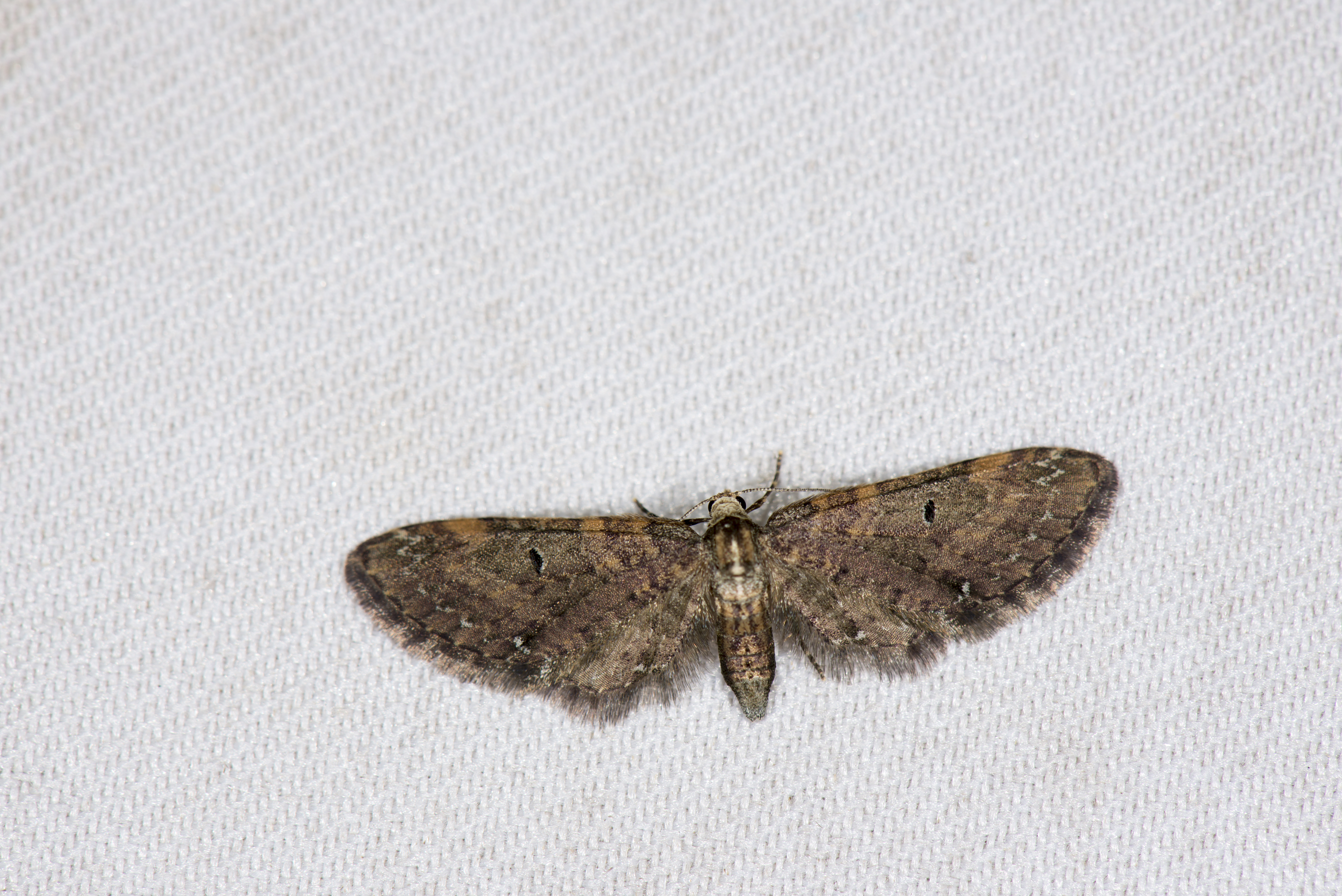

Scientific classification
- Kingdom: Animalia
- Phylum: Arthropoda
- Clade: Pancrustacea
- Class: Insecta
- Order: Lepidoptera
- Family: Geometridae
- Genus: Eupithecia
- Species: E. convexa

Binomial name
- Eupithecia convexa Inoue, 1988

= Eupithecia convexa =

Species of moth

Eupithecia convexa is a moth in the family Geometridae. It is found in Taiwan and Thailand.
