= Eupithecia dealbata =

Scientific classification
- Kingdom: Animalia
- Phylum: Arthropoda
- Class: Insecta
- Order: Lepidoptera
- Family: Geometridae
- Genus: Eupithecia
- Species: E. dealbata

Binomial name
- Eupithecia dealbata Inoue, 1988

Species of moth

Eupithecia dealbata is a moth in the family Geometridae. It is found in Taiwan.
