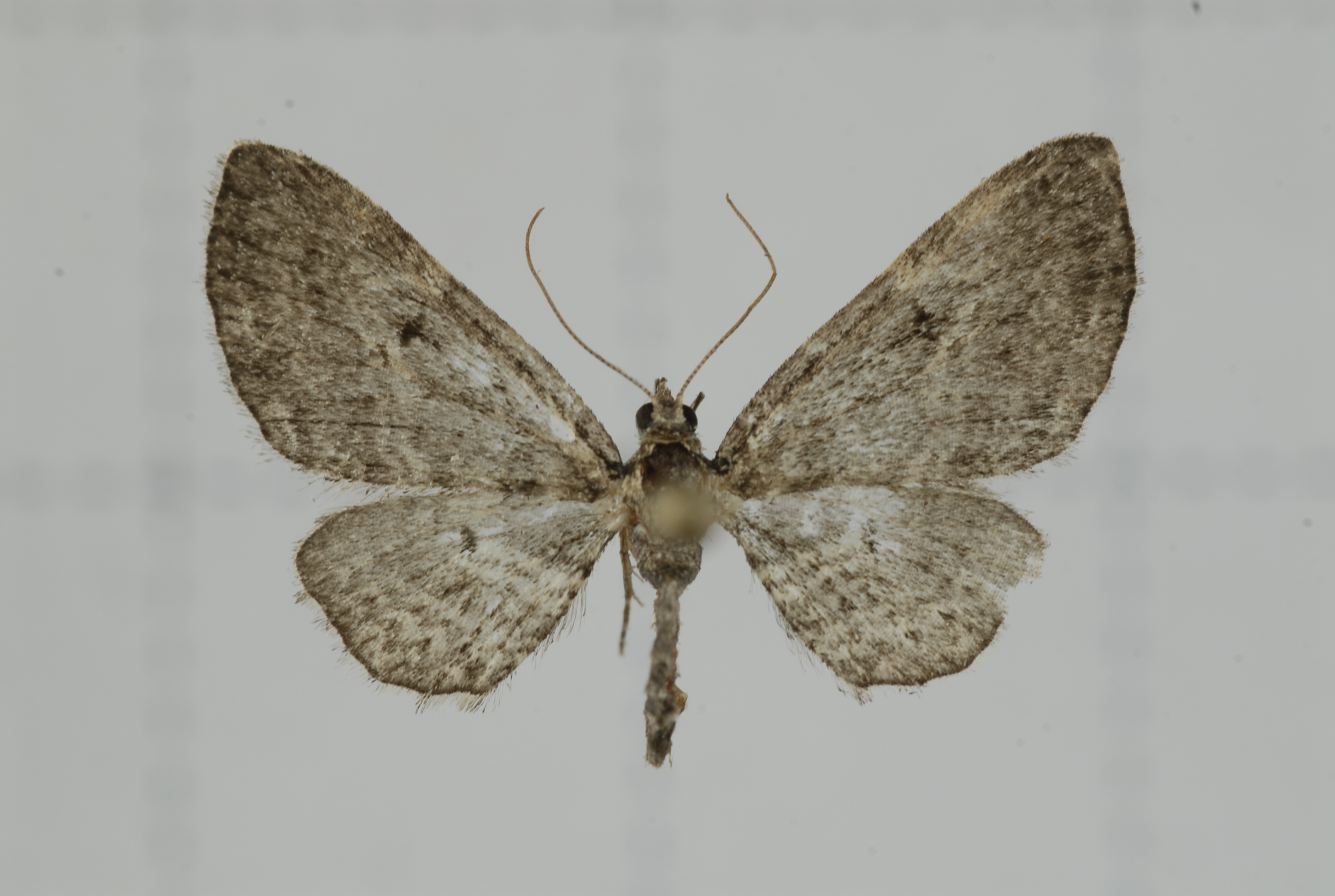

Scientific classification
- Kingdom: Animalia
- Phylum: Arthropoda
- Class: Insecta
- Order: Lepidoptera
- Family: Geometridae
- Genus: Eupithecia
- Species: E. hashimotoi

Binomial name
- Eupithecia hashimotoi Inoue, 1988

= Eupithecia hashimotoi =

Species of moth

Eupithecia hashimotoi is a moth in the family Geometridae. It is found in Taiwan.
