= Eupithecia supersophia =

Scientific classification
- Kingdom: Animalia
- Phylum: Arthropoda
- Class: Insecta
- Order: Lepidoptera
- Family: Geometridae
- Genus: Eupithecia
- Species: E. supersophia

Binomial name
- Eupithecia supersophia Inoue, 1987

Species of moth

Eupithecia supersophia is a moth in the family Geometridae. It is found in Nepal.
