= Eupithecia nishizawai =

Scientific classification
- Kingdom: Animalia
- Phylum: Arthropoda
- Class: Insecta
- Order: Lepidoptera
- Family: Geometridae
- Genus: Eupithecia
- Species: E. nishizawai

Binomial name
- Eupithecia nishizawai Inoue, 1988

Species of moth

Eupithecia nishizawai is a moth in the family Geometridae first described by Hiroshi Inoue in 1988. It is found in Taiwan.
