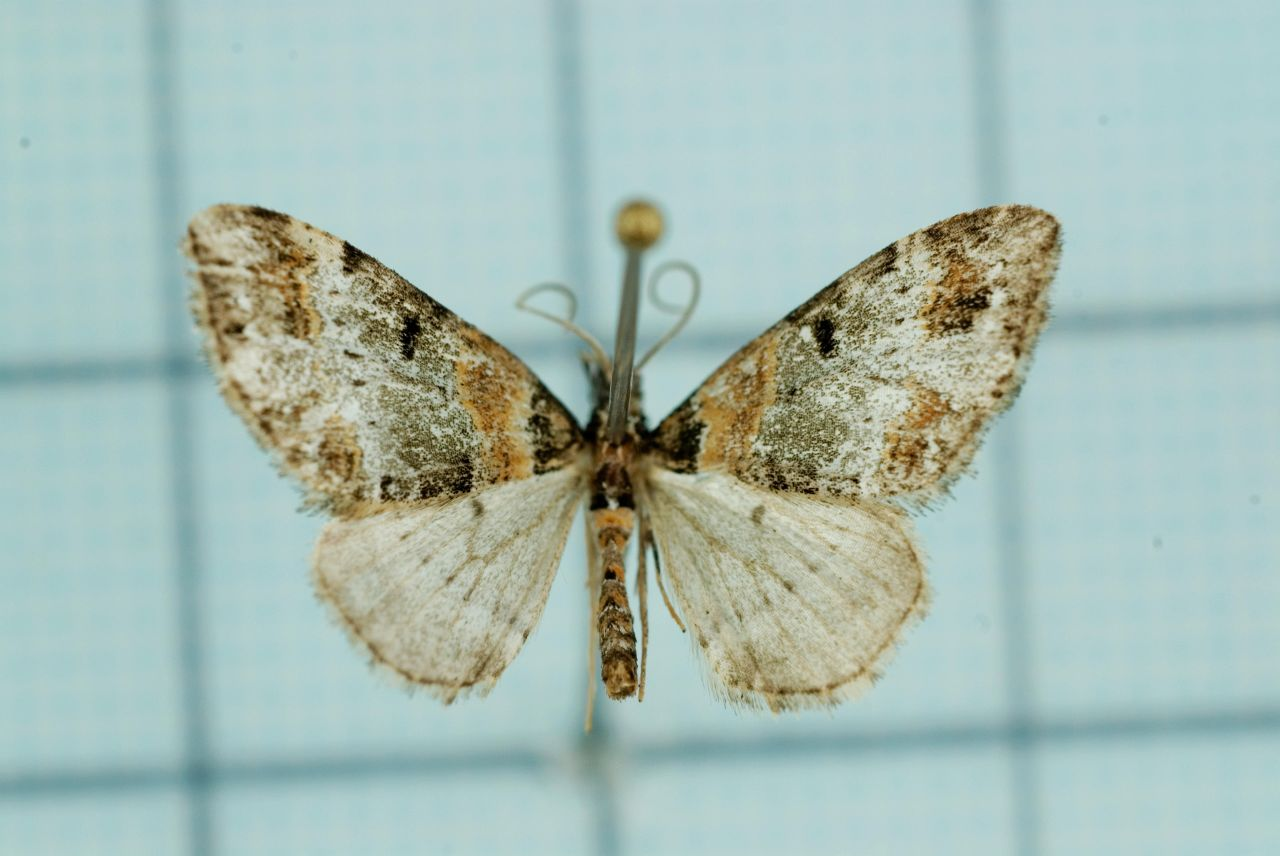

Scientific classification
- Kingdom: Animalia
- Phylum: Arthropoda
- Class: Insecta
- Order: Lepidoptera
- Family: Geometridae
- Genus: Eupithecia
- Species: E. kudoi

Binomial name
- Eupithecia kudoi Inoue, 1983

= Eupithecia kudoi =

Species of moth

Eupithecia kudoi is a moth in the family Geometridae. It is found in Taiwan and Vietnam.
