= Eupithecia lactibasis =

Scientific classification
- Kingdom: Animalia
- Phylum: Arthropoda
- Class: Insecta
- Order: Lepidoptera
- Family: Geometridae
- Genus: Eupithecia
- Species: E. lactibasis

Binomial name
- Eupithecia lactibasis Inoue, 2000

Species of moth

Eupithecia lactibasis is a moth in the family Geometridae. It is found in north- India (Darjeeling) and Nepal.
