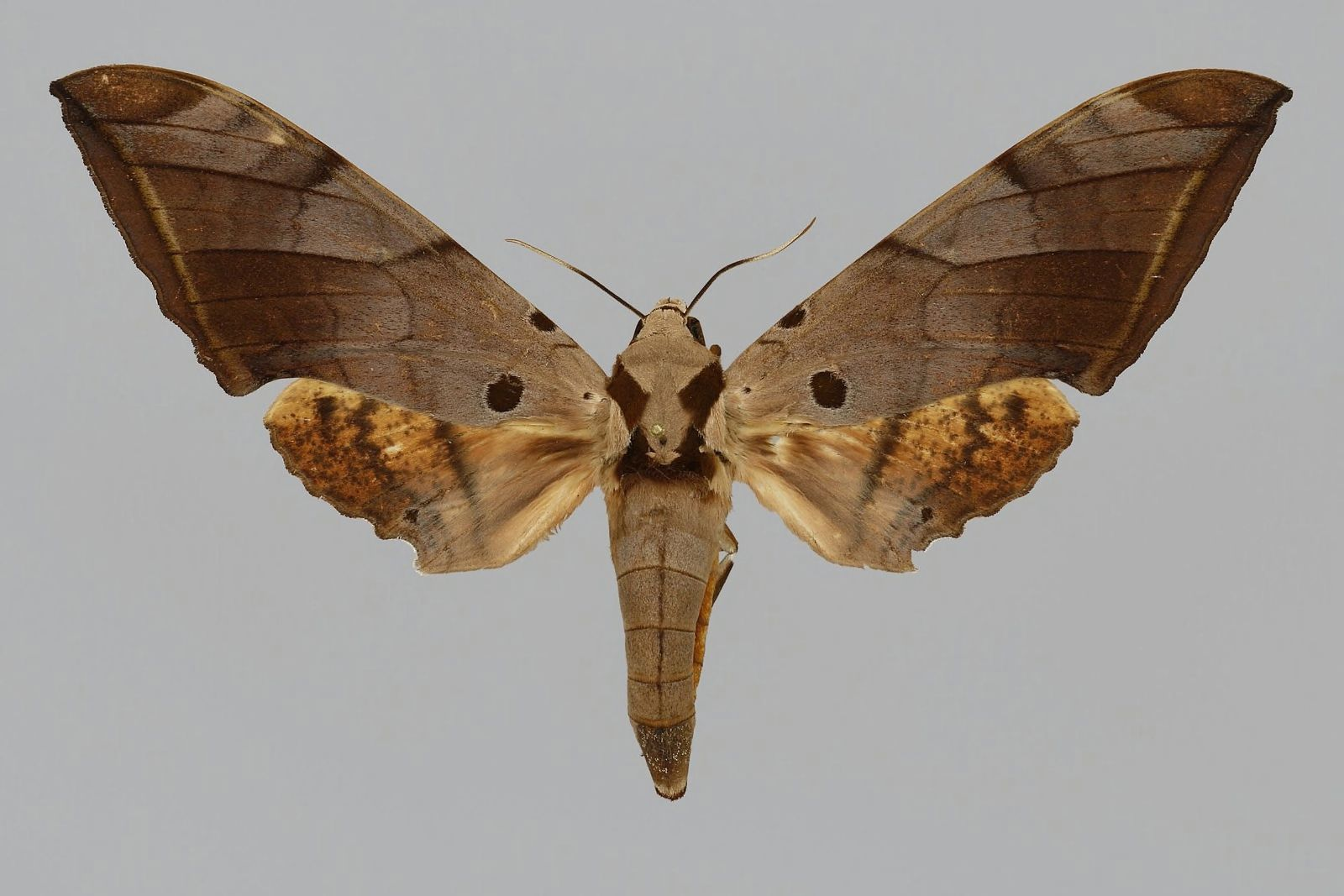
- Female

Scientific classification
- Kingdom: Animalia
- Phylum: Arthropoda
- Class: Insecta
- Order: Lepidoptera
- Family: Sphingidae
- Genus: Ambulyx
- Species: A. pseudoclavata

Binomial name
- Ambulyx pseudoclavata Inoue, 1996

= Ambulyx pseudoclavata =

Species of moth

Ambulyx pseudoclavata is a species of moth of the family Sphingidae. It is known from Thailand.
