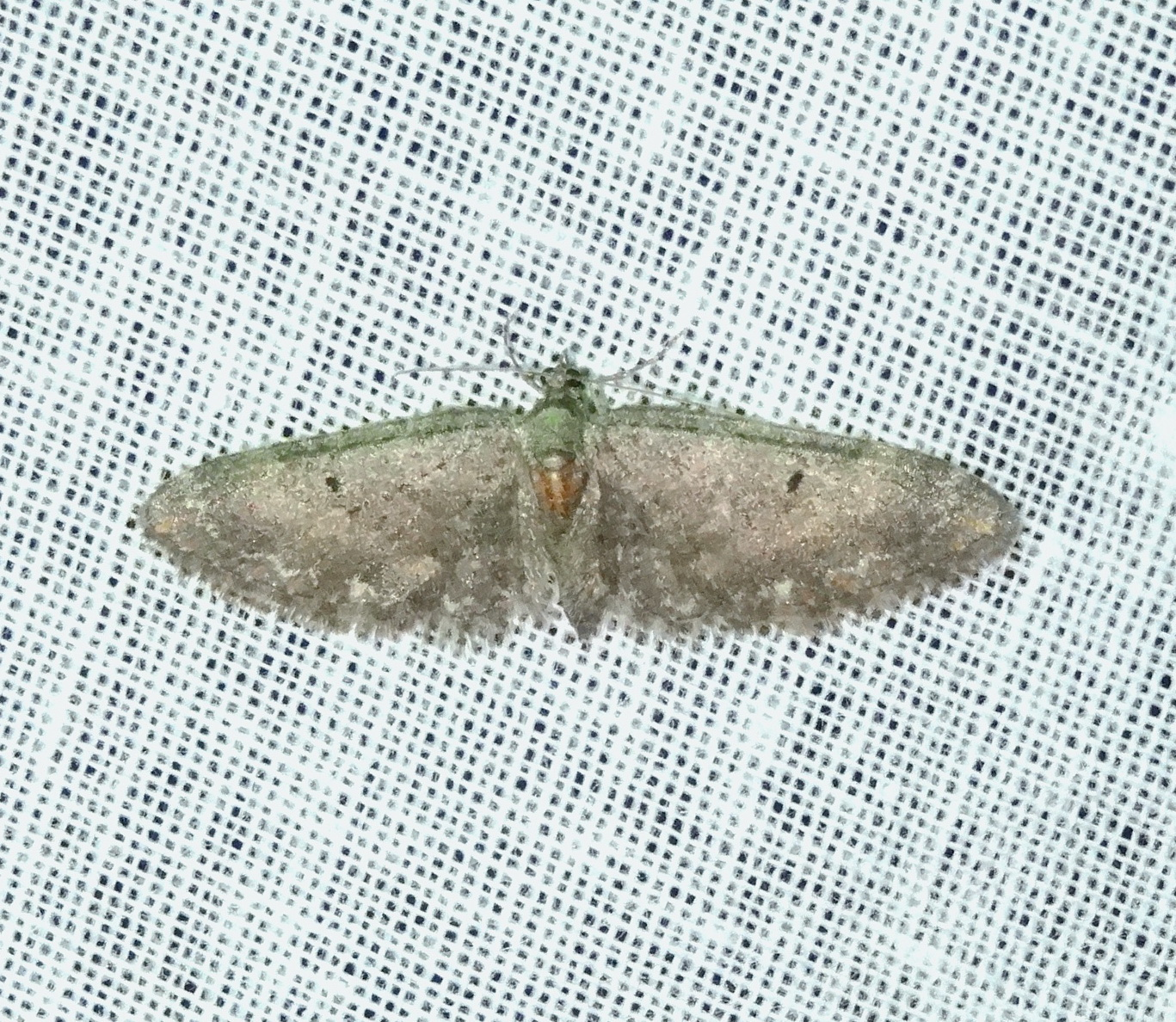

Scientific classification
- Kingdom: Animalia
- Phylum: Arthropoda
- Class: Insecta
- Order: Lepidoptera
- Family: Geometridae
- Genus: Eupithecia
- Species: E. megaproterva

Binomial name
- Eupithecia megaproterva Inoue, 1988

= Eupithecia megaproterva =

Species of moth

Eupithecia megaproterva is a moth in the family Geometridae. It is found in Japan and Taiwan.
