= Eupithecia exrubicunda =

Scientific classification
- Kingdom: Animalia
- Phylum: Arthropoda
- Class: Insecta
- Order: Lepidoptera
- Family: Geometridae
- Genus: Eupithecia
- Species: E. exrubicunda

Binomial name
- Eupithecia exrubicunda Inoue, 1988

Species of moth

Eupithecia exrubicunda is a moth in the family Geometridae. It is endemic to Taiwan where it occurs at high elevations (2,600–2,760 m (8,530–9,060 ft) above sea level).
