= Eupithecia karnaliensis =

Scientific classification
- Kingdom: Animalia
- Phylum: Arthropoda
- Class: Insecta
- Order: Lepidoptera
- Family: Geometridae
- Genus: Eupithecia
- Species: E. karnaliensis

Binomial name
- Eupithecia karnaliensis Inoue, 2000

Species of moth

Eupithecia karnaliensis is a moth in the family Geometridae. It is found in Afghanistan, the Great Western Himalaya Mountains (Jammu & Kashmir) and Nepal. It is found at altitudes between 2,200 and 3,200 meters.
