= Eupithecia chui =

Scientific classification
- Kingdom: Animalia
- Phylum: Arthropoda
- Class: Insecta
- Order: Lepidoptera
- Family: Geometridae
- Genus: Eupithecia
- Species: E. chui

Binomial name
- Eupithecia chui Inoue, 1970

Species of moth

Eupithecia chui is a moth in the family Geometridae. It is found in Taiwan.
