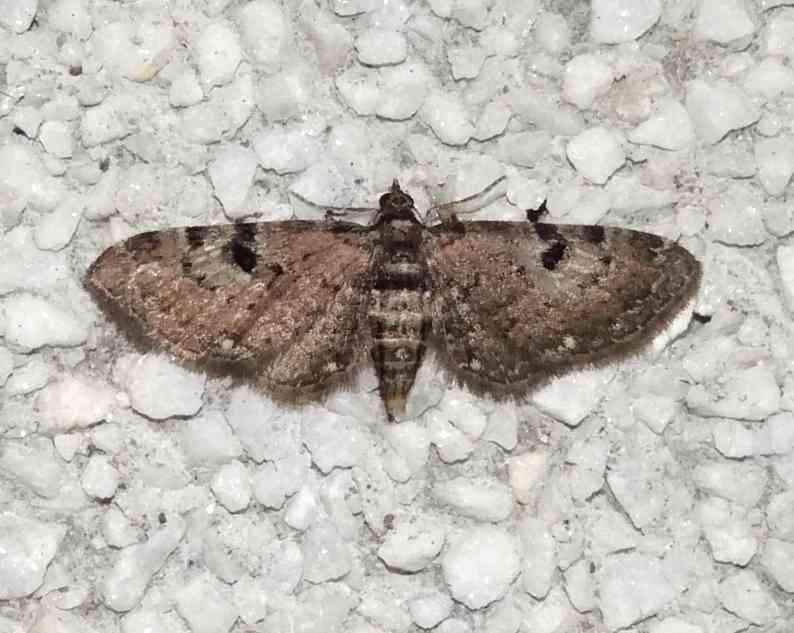

Scientific classification
- Kingdom: Animalia
- Phylum: Arthropoda
- Class: Insecta
- Order: Lepidoptera
- Family: Geometridae
- Genus: Eupithecia
- Species: E. yazakii

Binomial name
- Eupithecia yazakii Inoue, 1988

= Eupithecia yazakii =

Species of moth

Eupithecia yazakii is a moth in the family Geometridae. It is found in Japan and Taiwan.
