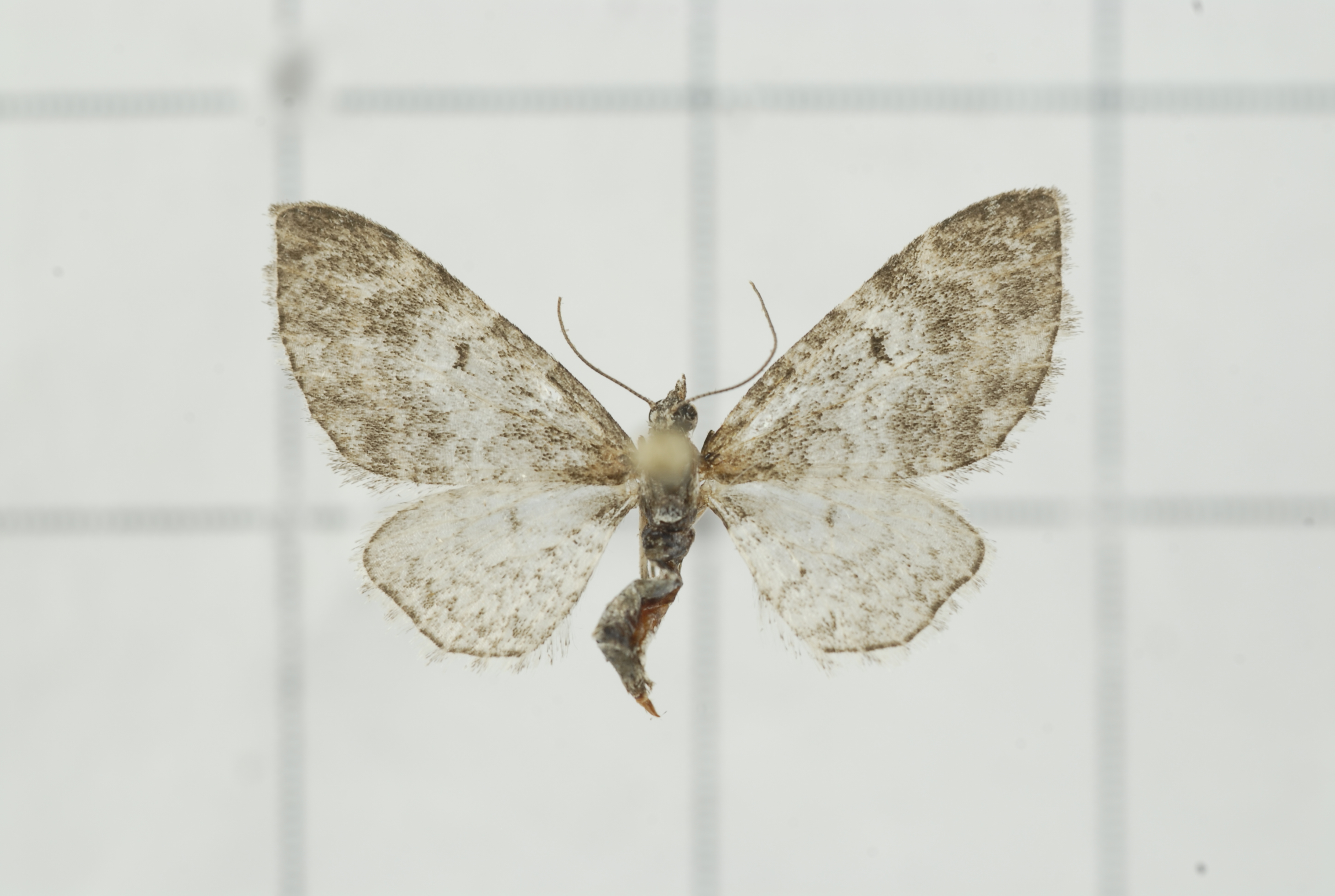

Scientific classification
- Kingdom: Animalia
- Phylum: Arthropoda
- Class: Insecta
- Order: Lepidoptera
- Family: Geometridae
- Genus: Eupithecia
- Species: E. yoshimotoi

Binomial name
- Eupithecia yoshimotoi Inoue, 1988

= Eupithecia yoshimotoi =

Species of moth

Eupithecia yoshimotoi is a moth in the family Geometridae. It is found in Taiwan.
