= Eupithecia vojnitsi =

Scientific classification
- Kingdom: Animalia
- Phylum: Arthropoda
- Class: Insecta
- Order: Lepidoptera
- Family: Geometridae
- Genus: Eupithecia
- Species: E. vojnitsi

Binomial name
- Eupithecia vojnitsi Inoue, 2000

Synonyms
- Eupithecia tenebricosa Vojnits, 1983 (Preocc. Eupithecia selinata f. tenebricosa Dietze, 1910)

Species of moth

Eupithecia vojnitsi is a moth in the family Geometridae. It is found in Nepal.
