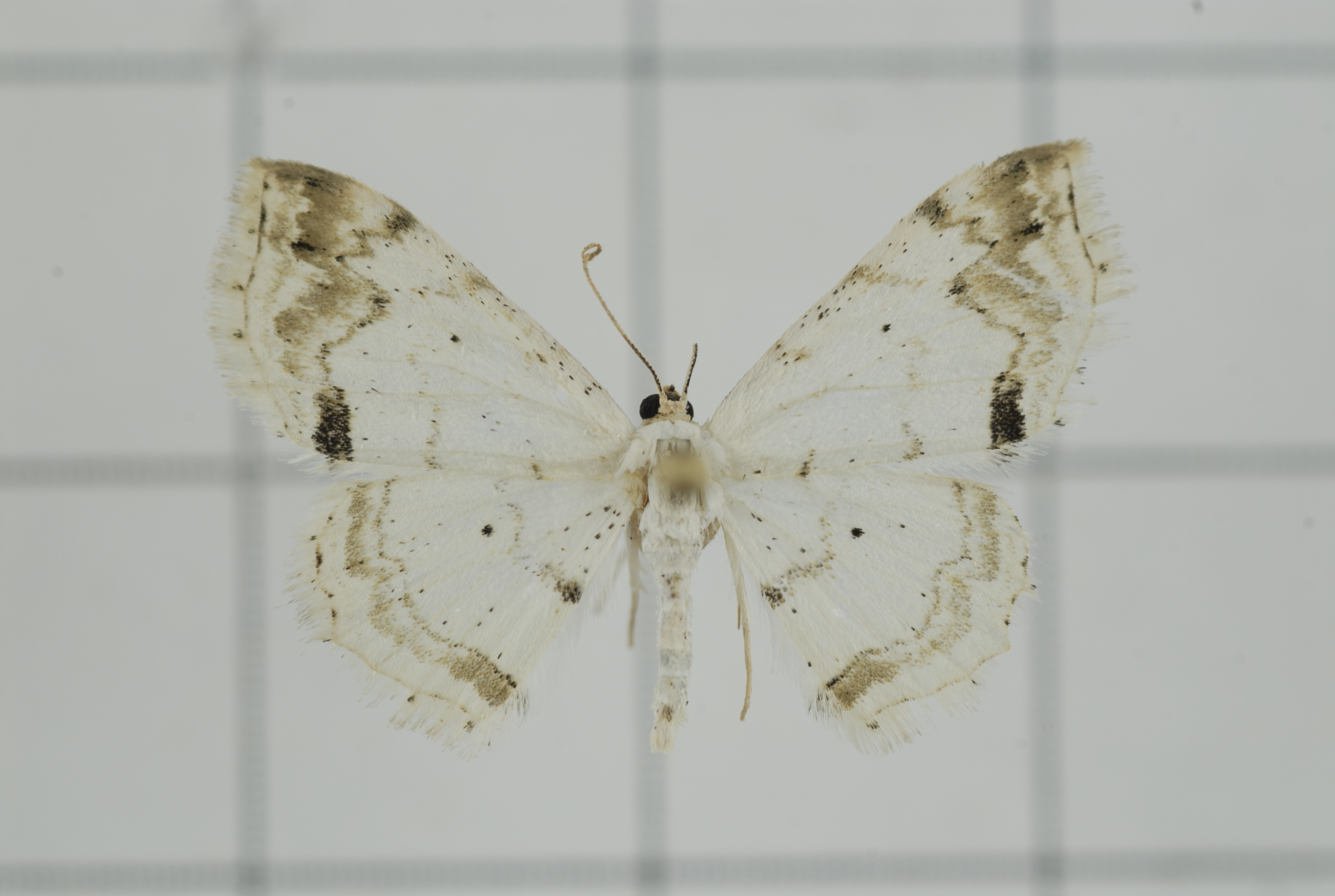

Scientific classification
- Kingdom: Animalia
- Phylum: Arthropoda
- Class: Insecta
- Order: Lepidoptera
- Family: Geometridae
- Genus: Scopula
- Species: S. yamanei

Binomial name
- Scopula yamanei Inoue, 1978

= Scopula yamanei =

Species of geometer moth in subfamily Sterrhinae

Scopula yamanei is a moth of the family Geometridae. It is found in Taiwan.
