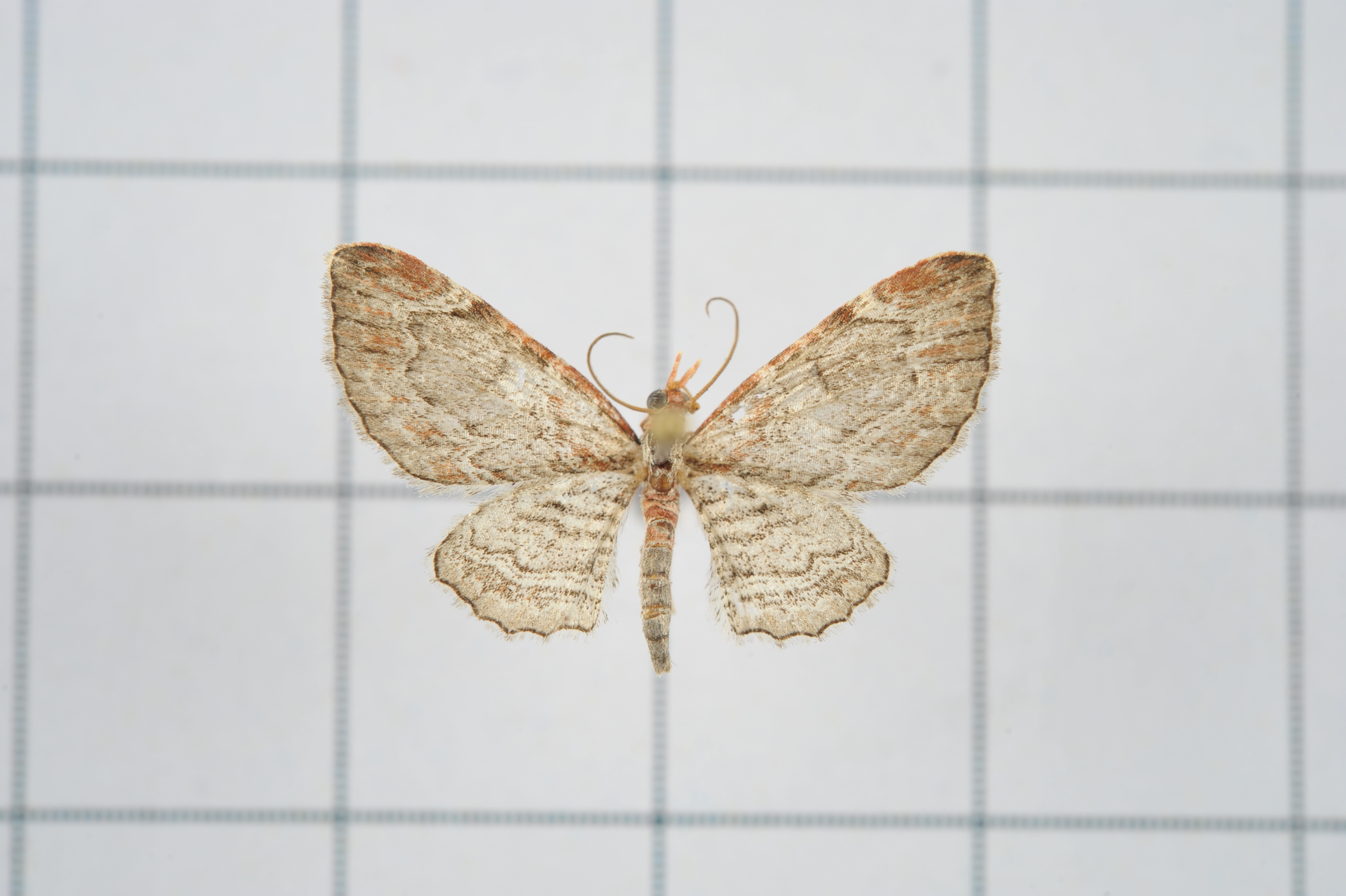

Scientific classification
- Kingdom: Animalia
- Phylum: Arthropoda
- Class: Insecta
- Order: Lepidoptera
- Family: Geometridae
- Genus: Eupithecia
- Species: E. costalis

Binomial name
- Eupithecia costalis Walker, 1863

Synonyms
- Leiocera ferrisparsata Hampson, 1893; Pena costalis

= Eupithecia costalis =

Species of moth

Eupithecia costalis is a moth in the family Geometridae first described by Francis Walker in 1863. It is widespread in the tropical and subtropical lowland regions of east and south-east Asia, from Taiwan to India, Sri Lanka Borneo, to Hong Kong.

== Description ==
Its wingspan is about 22 mm. The palpi have the second joint reaching far beyond the frontal tuft. Forewings with no tuft of raised scales on discocellulars. In the female, the body is cinereous white. The palpi, head, collar and forelegs bright rusty. Abdomen with a rusty band on first segment. Forewings with rusty costa. Some fuscous found on sub-costal nervure. A waved sub-basal dark line and double dark-edged pale antemedial and postmedial bands can be seen. Postmedial bands are excurved beyond cell, dentate outwards on veins 6 and 4, and inwards below vein 2. Two irregularly dentate medial lines present. The outer area rusty, turning to brown at the margin. A pale waved submarginal line. Hindwings with four waved lines on basal half. A double dark-edged postmedial pale band incurved beyond cell. Both wings with fine marginal line.
