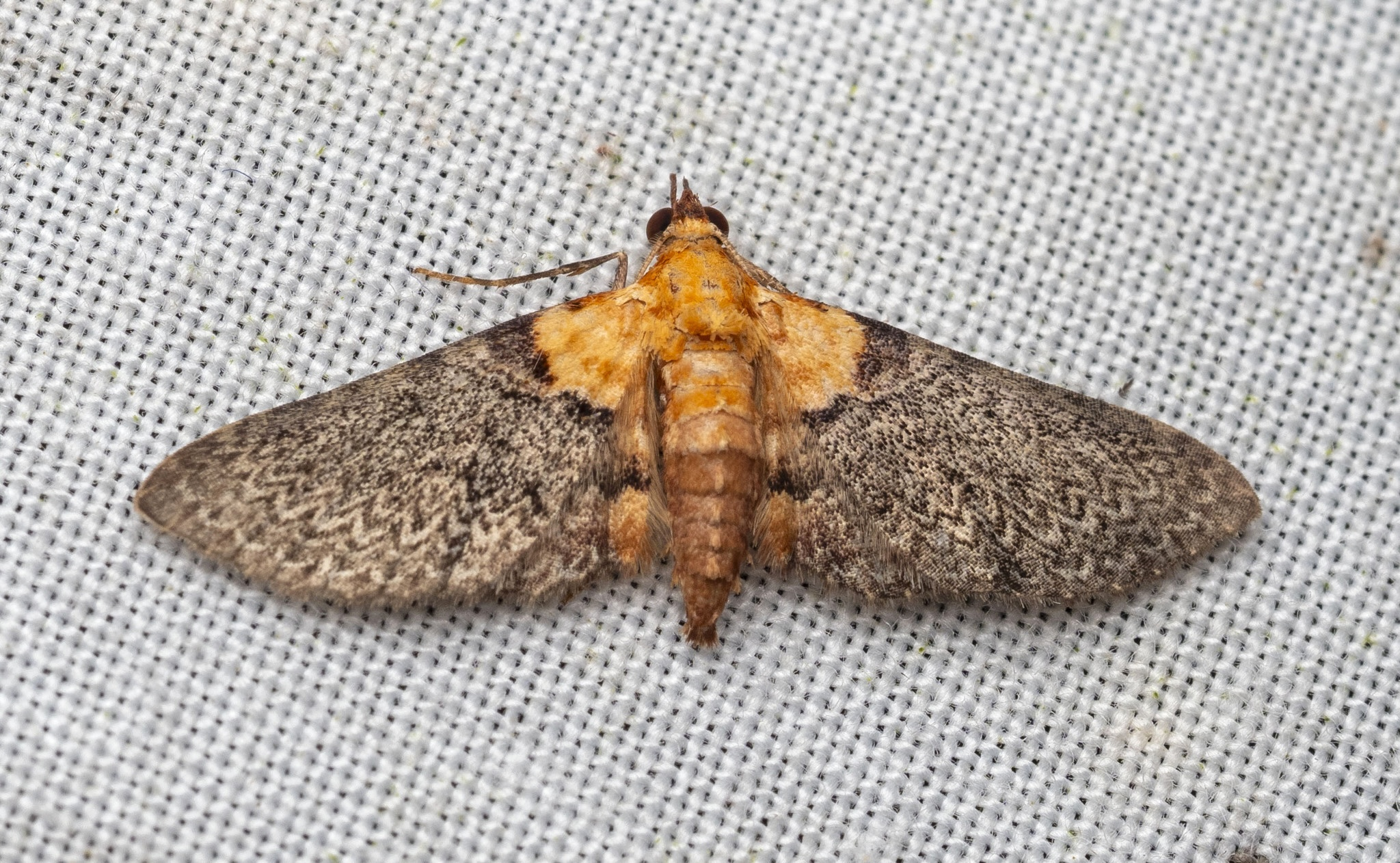
- Dorsal view of Eupithecia cuneilineata

Scientific classification
- Kingdom: Animalia
- Phylum: Arthropoda
- Clade: Pancrustacea
- Class: Insecta
- Order: Lepidoptera
- Family: Geometridae
- Genus: Eupithecia
- Species: E. cuneilineata

Binomial name
- Eupithecia cuneilineata (Warren, 1905)

Synonyms
- Tephroclystia cuneilineata Warren, 1905

= Eupithecia cuneilineata =

Species of moth

Eupithecia cuneilineata is a species of moth in the family Geometridae. It is found in Western South America, including Colombia, Ecuador, and Peru.

== Description ==
The wingspan is approximately 24 mm. The head, thorax, and abdomen, as well as basal area of the forewings and the inner margin of the hindwings, are dull orange. The rest of the wings are patterned darker and lighter grey with lunulate lines.
