= Eupithecia eduardi =

Scientific classification
- Kingdom: Animalia
- Phylum: Arthropoda
- Clade: Pancrustacea
- Class: Insecta
- Order: Lepidoptera
- Family: Geometridae
- Genus: Eupithecia
- Species: E. eduardi

Binomial name
- Eupithecia eduardi Mironov & Ratzel, 2012

Synonyms
- Eupithecia inquinata Schütze, 1961 (preocc. Eupithecia inquinata D. S. Fletcher, 1950)

Species of moth

Eupithecia eduardi is a moth in the family Geometridae. It was described by Vladimir G. Mironov and Ulrich Ratzel in 2012 and it is found in Iran.
