= Eupithecia inquinata =

Scientific classification
- Domain: Eukaryota
- Kingdom: Animalia
- Phylum: Arthropoda
- Class: Insecta
- Order: Lepidoptera
- Family: Geometridae
- Genus: Eupithecia
- Species: E. inquinata

Binomial name
- Eupithecia inquinata D. S. Fletcher, 1950

Species of moth

Eupithecia inquinata is a moth in the family Geometridae. It was described by David Stephen Fletcher in 1950 and it is found in Ethiopia.
