= Eupithecia kuldschaensis =

Scientific classification
- Domain: Eukaryota
- Kingdom: Animalia
- Phylum: Arthropoda
- Class: Insecta
- Order: Lepidoptera
- Family: Geometridae
- Genus: Eupithecia
- Species: E. kuldschaensis

Binomial name
- Eupithecia kuldschaensis Staudinger, 1892

Synonyms
- Eupithecia kuldshaensis Viidalepp, 1988 (misspelling); Eupithecia aporia Vojnits, 1975

Species of moth

Eupithecia kuldschaensis is a moth in the family Geometridae. It is found in Mongolia, China and south-east Kazakhstan. It has been found at an altitude between 1200 and 2000 meters, and is on wing in a single generation from mid-June to mid-July.

Both fore- and hindwings are a pale ochre tinged with some grey, with the hindwings slightly paler than the forewings. On both wings, the terminal area is darkened with a weak and wavy subterminal line, which is white on the forewing and whitish on the hindwing. The forewing's costal area is pale grey.
