= Eupithecia mallecoensis =

Scientific classification
- Kingdom: Animalia
- Phylum: Arthropoda
- Class: Insecta
- Order: Lepidoptera
- Family: Geometridae
- Genus: Eupithecia
- Species: E. mallecoensis

Binomial name
- Eupithecia mallecoensis Rindge, 1987

Species of moth

Eupithecia mallecoensis is a moth in the family Geometridae. It is found in the regions of Maule (Curico, Talca and Cauquenes provinces), BioBio (the Province of Bio-Bio), Araucania (Malleco Province) and Los Lagos (Osorno and Chiloe provinces) in Chile. The habitat consists of the Central Coastal Cordillera, Northern Valdivian Forest and the Valdivian Forest biotic provinces.

The length of the forewings is about 9.5 mm for males and 9–10 mm for females. Adults have been recorded on wing from November to February.

== Etymology ==
The specific name is based on the type locality.
