= Eupithecia frequens =

Scientific classification
- Kingdom: Animalia
- Phylum: Arthropoda
- Class: Insecta
- Order: Lepidoptera
- Family: Geometridae
- Genus: Eupithecia
- Species: E. frequens

Binomial name
- Eupithecia frequens Butler, 1882

Species of moth

Eupithecia frequens is a moth in the family Geometridae. It is found in the regions of Coquimbo (El Qui Province), Valparaiso (Aconcagua Province), Santiago (Santiago Province), Maule (Curico, Talca, Cauquenes, and Linares provinces) and Los Lagos (Valdivia Province) in Chile. The habitat consists of the Coquimban Desert, Central Andean Cordillera, Central Valley and Northern Valdivian Forest biotic provinces.

The length of the forewings is about 8.5 mm for males and 8.5-9.5 mm for females. Adults have been recorded on wing from September to January and in April and June.
