= Eupithecia pucatrihue =

Scientific classification
- Kingdom: Animalia
- Phylum: Arthropoda
- Class: Insecta
- Order: Lepidoptera
- Family: Geometridae
- Genus: Eupithecia
- Species: E. pucatrihue

Binomial name
- Eupithecia pucatrihue Rindge, 1987

Species of moth

Eupithecia pucatrihue is a moth in the family Geometridae. It is found in the regions of Santiago (Santiago Province), Araucania (Malleco and Cautin provinces) and Los Lagos (Osomo Province) in Chile. The habitat consists of the Central Valley, the Northern Valdivian Forest and the Valdivian Forest biotic provinces.

The length of the forewings is about 10 mm for males and 9–10.5 mm for females. Adults have been recorded on wing in October, December, February and March.

== Etymology ==
The specific name is based on the type locality.
