= Eupithecia picada =

Scientific classification
- Kingdom: Animalia
- Phylum: Arthropoda
- Class: Insecta
- Order: Lepidoptera
- Family: Geometridae
- Genus: Eupithecia
- Species: E. picada

Binomial name
- Eupithecia picada Rindge, 1987

Species of moth

Eupithecia picada is a moth in the family Geometridae. It is found in the regions of Biobio (Nuble Province), Araucania (Cautin Province) and Los Lagos (Valdivia, Osorno, Llanquihue, and Chiloe provinces) in Chile. The habitat consists of the Northern Valdivian Forest and the Valdivian Forest biotic provinces.

The length of the forewings is about 10.5 mm for males and 9–11 mm for females. Adults have been recorded on wing in December, January, February and March.

== Etymology ==
The specific name is based on the type locality.
