= Eupithecia yelchoensis =

Scientific classification
- Kingdom: Animalia
- Phylum: Arthropoda
- Class: Insecta
- Order: Lepidoptera
- Family: Geometridae
- Genus: Eupithecia
- Species: E. yelchoensis

Binomial name
- Eupithecia yelchoensis Rindge, 1987

Species of moth

Eupithecia yelchoensis is a moth in the family Geometridae. It is found in the regions of Biobio (Nuble Province) and Los Lagos (Llanquihue and Paleno provinces) in Chile. The habitat consists of the Northern Valdivian and Valdivian Forest Biotic provinces.

The length of the forewings is about 8.5 mm for males and 8.5–9 mm for females. Adults have been recorded on wing in December and January.

== Etymology ==
The specific name is based on the type locality, with the suffix -ensis added.
