= Eupithecia spurcata =

Scientific classification
- Kingdom: Animalia
- Phylum: Arthropoda
- Class: Insecta
- Order: Lepidoptera
- Family: Geometridae
- Genus: Eupithecia
- Species: E. spurcata

Binomial name
- Eupithecia spurcata (Warren, 1904)

Synonyms
- Tephroclystia spurcata Warren, 1904; Neopithecia akerbergsi Vojnits, 1985

Species of insect

Eupithecia spurcata is a moth in the family Geometridae. It is found in the regions of Araucania (Malleco and Cautin provinces) and Los Lagos (Valdivia, Osorno, and Chiloe provinces) in Chile.

The length of the forewings is about 9.5–11 mm for males and 9.5–12 mm for females. Adults have been recorded on wing in September, December, January, February and April.
