= Eupithecia deverrata =

Scientific classification
- Domain: Eukaryota
- Kingdom: Animalia
- Phylum: Arthropoda
- Class: Insecta
- Order: Lepidoptera
- Family: Geometridae
- Genus: Eupithecia
- Species: E. deverrata

Binomial name
- Eupithecia deverrata Dietze, 1910

Synonyms
- Eupithecia lecerfi Prout, 1928

Species of moth

Eupithecia deverrata is a moth in the family Geometridae. It is found from Morocco to Lebanon.

The wingspan is about 17.5 mm.

== Subspecies ==
- Eupithecia deverrata deverrata
- Eupithecia deverrata lecerfi Prout, 1928 (Morocco)
- Eupithecia deverrata prouti Zerny, 1933 (Lebanon)
