= Eupithecia pamirica =

Scientific classification
- Domain: Eukaryota
- Kingdom: Animalia
- Phylum: Arthropoda
- Class: Insecta
- Order: Lepidoptera
- Family: Geometridae
- Genus: Eupithecia
- Species: E. pamirica

Binomial name
- Eupithecia pamirica Viidalepp, 1988

Species of moth

Eupithecia pamirica is a moth in the family Geometridae. It is found in Afghanistan, Tajikistan (the Darvazsky Mountains, Ghissarsky Mountains and south-western Pamirs), Kyrgyzstan (the Tchatkal Nature Reserve) and Pakistan (the Deosai Mountains, the Great Western Himalaya Mountains and the Karakoram Mountains). It is found at altitudes between 1,800 and 3,500 meters.
