= Eupithecia caburgua =

Scientific classification
- Kingdom: Animalia
- Phylum: Arthropoda
- Class: Insecta
- Order: Lepidoptera
- Family: Geometridae
- Genus: Eupithecia
- Species: E. caburgua

Binomial name
- Eupithecia caburgua Rindge, 1987

Species of moth

Eupithecia caburgua is a moth in the family Geometridae. It is found in the regions of Santiago (Santiago Province), Araucania (Cautin Province) and Los Lagos (Osorno Province) in Chile. The habitat consists of the Central Valley, Northern Valdivian Forest and the Valdivian Forest biotic provinces.

The length of the forewings is about 8.5–9 mm for females. Adults have been recorded on wing in October, January and February.

== Etymology ==
The specific name is based on the type locality.
