= Eupithecia rosalia =

Scientific classification
- Kingdom: Animalia
- Phylum: Arthropoda
- Class: Insecta
- Order: Lepidoptera
- Family: Geometridae
- Genus: Eupithecia
- Species: E. rosalia

Binomial name
- Eupithecia rosalia Butler, 1882

Synonyms
- Propithecia kristenseni Vojnits, 1985

Species of moth

Eupithecia rosalia is a moth in the family Geometridae. It is found in the regions of Araucania (Malleco Province) and Los Lagos (Valdivia and Osorno provinces) in Chile. The habitat consists of the Northern Valdivian Forest and Valdivian Forest biotic provinces.

The length of the forewings is about 8.5–10 mm for males and 9 mm for females. Adults have been recorded on wing from November to February.
