= Eupithecia atacamaensis =

Scientific classification
- Kingdom: Animalia
- Phylum: Arthropoda
- Class: Insecta
- Order: Lepidoptera
- Family: Geometridae
- Genus: Eupithecia
- Species: E. atacamaensis

Binomial name
- Eupithecia atacamaensis Rindge, 1987

Species of moth

Eupithecia atacamaensis is a moth in the family Geometridae. It is found in the regions of Atacama (Huasco Province) and Coquimbo (El Qui Province) in Chile. The habitat consists of the Intermediate Desert and Coquimban Desert Biotic Provinces.

The length of the forewings is about 8.5 mm for males and 8.5–9 mm for females. Adults have been recorded on wing in October and February.

== Etymology ==
The specific name is derived from the type locality.
