= Eupithecia hilariata =

Scientific classification
- Domain: Eukaryota
- Kingdom: Animalia
- Phylum: Arthropoda
- Class: Insecta
- Order: Lepidoptera
- Family: Geometridae
- Genus: Eupithecia
- Species: E. hilariata

Binomial name
- Eupithecia hilariata Dietze, 1908

Species of moth

Eupithecia hilariata is a moth in the family Geometridae. It is found in Afghanistan, Turkmenistan (the Kugitang Mountains), Uzbekistan (the Karzhan Tau Mountains and Chimgan Mountains), Tajikistan (the Pamirs Mountains), Kyrgyzstan (the Tien-Shan Mountains), the mountains of southern and south-eastern Kazakhstan and north-western China (Xinjiang).
