= Eupithecia hastaria =

Scientific classification
- Domain: Eukaryota
- Kingdom: Animalia
- Phylum: Arthropoda
- Class: Insecta
- Order: Lepidoptera
- Family: Geometridae
- Genus: Eupithecia
- Species: E. hastaria

Binomial name
- Eupithecia hastaria (Warren, 1906)

Synonyms
- Tephroclystia hastaria Warren, 1906; Eupithecia hastaria nebulata D. S. Fletcher, 1953 (preocc.)

Species of moth

Eupithecia hastaria is a moth in the family Geometridae described by William Warren in 1906. It is found in Brazil and Argentina.

== Subspecies ==
- Eupithecia hastaria hastaria
- Eupithecia hastaria tango Kocak, 2004
