= Eupithecia subtilis =

Scientific classification
- Domain: Eukaryota
- Kingdom: Animalia
- Phylum: Arthropoda
- Class: Insecta
- Order: Lepidoptera
- Family: Geometridae
- Genus: Eupithecia
- Species: E. subtilis

Binomial name
- Eupithecia subtilis Dietze, 1910

Synonyms
- Eupithecia staudingeri f. subtilis Dietze, 1910; Eupithecia tonu Viidalepp, 1988; Eupithecia tona

Species of moth

Eupithecia subtilis is a moth in the family Geometridae. It is found in Afghanistan, Iran, Uzbekistan, Kyrgyzstan, Tajikistan and Pakistan. It is found at altitudes between 1,500 and 3,500 meters.
