= Eupithecia praesignata =

Scientific classification
- Domain: Eukaryota
- Kingdom: Animalia
- Phylum: Arthropoda
- Class: Insecta
- Order: Lepidoptera
- Family: Geometridae
- Genus: Eupithecia
- Species: E. praesignata

Binomial name
- Eupithecia praesignata Bohatsch, 1893

Synonyms
- Eupithecia insignata Bohatsch, 1893 (preocc. Phalaena Geometra insignata Hübner, 1789)

Species of moth

Eupithecia praesignata is a moth in the family Geometridae. It is found in Afghanistan, Uzbekistan, Tajikistan, Kyrgyzstan, north-western China (Xinjiang), Jammu & Kashmir and India (the Ladakh Mountains).
