= Eupithecia rubellata =

Scientific classification
- Kingdom: Animalia
- Phylum: Arthropoda
- Class: Insecta
- Order: Lepidoptera
- Family: Geometridae
- Genus: Eupithecia
- Species: E. rubellata

Binomial name
- Eupithecia rubellata Dietze, 1904

Synonyms
- Eupithecia rubellata f. deserticola Dietze, 1910; Eupithecia rubellata f. mediopunctata Dietze, 1910; Eupithecia rubellata f. scotaeata Dietze, 1910; Eupithecia invenusta Vojnits, 1977

Species of moth

Eupithecia rubellata is a moth in the family Geometridae, which is found in Central Asia, including Tibet, Mongolia and the western Himalayas.
