= Eupithecia luteonigra =

Scientific classification
- Domain: Eukaryota
- Kingdom: Animalia
- Phylum: Arthropoda
- Class: Insecta
- Order: Lepidoptera
- Family: Geometridae
- Genus: Eupithecia
- Species: E. luteonigra

Binomial name
- Eupithecia luteonigra (Warren, 1907)

Synonyms
- Tephroclystia luteonigra Warren, 1907

Species of moth

Eupithecia luteonigra is a moth in the family Geometridae. It is found in Peru.

The forewings are buff, crossed obliquely by lines, which in places are darkened by blackish scales, the costal area above subcostal vein always remaining buff. The hindwings are whiter, crossed by six curved darker lines, marked black on the veins.
