= Eupithecia rufivenata =

Scientific classification
- Domain: Eukaryota
- Kingdom: Animalia
- Phylum: Arthropoda
- Class: Insecta
- Order: Lepidoptera
- Family: Geometridae
- Genus: Eupithecia
- Species: E. rufivenata

Binomial name
- Eupithecia rufivenata (Warren, 1907)

Synonyms
- Tephroclystia rufivenata Warren, 1907

Species of moth

Eupithecia rufivenata is a moth in the family Geometridae. It is found in Peru.

The wingspan is about 20 mm. The forewings are pale olive from the base to the central fascia, with a dark curved line close to the base. The hindwings are luteous grey, with traces of straight dark grey lines, plain only on the inner margin.
