= Eupithecia horismoides =

Scientific classification
- Kingdom: Animalia
- Phylum: Arthropoda
- Class: Insecta
- Order: Lepidoptera
- Family: Geometridae
- Genus: Eupithecia
- Species: E. horismoides

Binomial name
- Eupithecia horismoides Rindge, 1987

Species of moth

Eupithecia horismoides is a moth in the family Geometridae. It is found in the regions of Araucania (Cautin Province) and Los Lagos (the provinces of Osorno, Llanquihue, and Chiloe) in Chile. The habitat consists of the Northern Valdivian Forest and Valdivian Forest Biotic provinces.

The length of the forewings is about 14–16 mm for males and 14.5-16.5 mm for females.
