= Eupithecia trigenuata =

Scientific classification
- Domain: Eukaryota
- Kingdom: Animalia
- Phylum: Arthropoda
- Class: Insecta
- Order: Lepidoptera
- Family: Geometridae
- Genus: Eupithecia
- Species: E. trigenuata

Binomial name
- Eupithecia trigenuata (Warren, 1904)

Synonyms
- Tephroclystia trigenuata Warren, 1904

Species of moth

Eupithecia trigenuata is a moth in the family Geometridae. It is found in Peru.

The wingspan is about 25 mm. The forewings are pale ashy grey, but darker grey along the hindmargin. The lines are black and thicker towards the costa. The hindwings are whitish grey, with traces of black lines.
