= Eupithecia nepalata =

Scientific classification
- Kingdom: Animalia
- Phylum: Arthropoda
- Clade: Pancrustacea
- Class: Insecta
- Order: Lepidoptera
- Family: Geometridae
- Genus: Eupithecia
- Species: E. nepalata

Binomial name
- Eupithecia nepalata Schütze, 1961

Synonyms
- Eupithecia abundeli Vojnits, 1988; Eupithecia petrensis Mironov, 1989

Species of moth

Eupithecia nepalata is a moth in the family Geometridae. It is found in Nepal, Afghanistan, Tajikistan, northern Pakistan, northern India, and Yunnan (Southwestern China). The habitat consists of mountainous areas.
