= Eupithecia maule =

Scientific classification
- Kingdom: Animalia
- Phylum: Arthropoda
- Class: Insecta
- Order: Lepidoptera
- Family: Geometridae
- Genus: Eupithecia
- Species: E. maule

Binomial name
- Eupithecia maule Rindge, 1987

Species of moth

Eupithecia maule is a moth of the family Geometridae. It is found in the regions of Antofagasta (Antofagasta Province) and Maule (Cauquenes Province) in Chile. The habitat consists of the Northern Coast and the Central Valley biotic provinces.

The length of the forewings is about 8 mm for both males and females. Adults have been recorded on wing in October and January.

== Etymology ==
The specific name is based on the type locality.
