= Eupithecia sticticata =

Scientific classification
- Domain: Eukaryota
- Kingdom: Animalia
- Phylum: Arthropoda
- Class: Insecta
- Order: Lepidoptera
- Family: Geometridae
- Genus: Eupithecia
- Species: E. sticticata

Binomial name
- Eupithecia sticticata (Warren, 1907)

Synonyms
- Tephroclystia sticticata Warren, 1907

Species of moth

Eupithecia sticticata is a moth in the family Geometridae. It is found in Peru.

The wingspan is about 22 mm. The forewings are olive-grey, powdered with fine whitish scales. The lines are very fine, brown and marked by blackish dots on the veins. The hindwings are pale luteous.
