= Eupithecia tenuiscripta =

Scientific classification
- Domain: Eukaryota
- Kingdom: Animalia
- Phylum: Arthropoda
- Class: Insecta
- Order: Lepidoptera
- Family: Geometridae
- Genus: Eupithecia
- Species: E. tenuiscripta

Binomial name
- Eupithecia tenuiscripta (Warren, 1907)

Synonyms
- Emmesocoma tenuiscripta Warren, 1907

Species of moth

Eupithecia tenuiscripta is a moth in the family Geometridae found in New Guinea.

The wingspan is about 19 mm, and the forewings are brownish fuscous tinged with greenish. The hindwings are pale grey, with traces of darker grey curved lines.
