= Eupithecia coquimbo =

Scientific classification
- Kingdom: Animalia
- Phylum: Arthropoda
- Class: Insecta
- Order: Lepidoptera
- Family: Geometridae
- Genus: Eupithecia
- Species: E. coquimbo

Binomial name
- Eupithecia coquimbo Rindge, 1991

Species of moth

Eupithecia coquimbo is a moth in the family Geometridae. It is found the Region of Coquimbo (El Qui Province) in Chile. The habitat consists of the Coquimban Desert Biotic Province.

The length of the forewings is about 11 mm for males and 10.5 mm for females. Adults have been recorded on wing in October and November.

== Etymology ==
The specific name is based on the type locality.
