= Eupithecia encoensis =

Scientific classification
- Kingdom: Animalia
- Phylum: Arthropoda
- Class: Insecta
- Order: Lepidoptera
- Family: Geometridae
- Genus: Eupithecia
- Species: E. encoensis

Binomial name
- Eupithecia encoensis Rindge, 1987

Species of moth

Eupithecia encoensis is a moth in the family Geometridae. It is found in the Region of Los Lagos (Valdivia and Osorno provinces) in Chile. The habitat consists of the Valdivian Forest Biotic Province.

The length of the forewings is about 11–11.5 mm for females. Adults have been recorded on wing in January and February.

== Etymology ==
The specific name is based on the type locality.
