= Eupithecia melanograpta =

Scientific classification
- Domain: Eukaryota
- Kingdom: Animalia
- Phylum: Arthropoda
- Class: Insecta
- Order: Lepidoptera
- Family: Geometridae
- Genus: Eupithecia
- Species: E. melanograpta

Binomial name
- Eupithecia melanograpta (Warren, 1907)

Synonyms
- Tephroclystia melanograpta Warren, 1907

Species of moth

Eupithecia melanograpta is a moth in the family Geometridae. It is found in Peru.

The wingspan is about 15 mm. The forewings are dingy grey with a slight luteous tinge, crossed by darker grey lines. The hindwings are dingy grey, with the base paler.
