= Eupithecia yangana =

Scientific classification
- Domain: Eukaryota
- Kingdom: Animalia
- Phylum: Arthropoda
- Class: Insecta
- Order: Lepidoptera
- Family: Geometridae
- Genus: Eupithecia
- Species: E. yangana

Binomial name
- Eupithecia yangana Dognin, 1899

Synonyms
- Tephroclystia galenaria Warren, 1907

Species of moth

Eupithecia yangana is a moth in the family Geometridae. It is found in Ecuador and Peru.

The wingspan is about 24 mm. The forewings are pale grey, crossed by darker grey lines, forming blackish dashes on the veins. The hindwings are paler grey, without markings towards the costa.
