= Eupithecia convallata =

Scientific classification
- Domain: Eukaryota
- Kingdom: Animalia
- Phylum: Arthropoda
- Class: Insecta
- Order: Lepidoptera
- Family: Geometridae
- Genus: Eupithecia
- Species: E. convallata

Binomial name
- Eupithecia convallata Brandt, 1938

Synonyms
- Eupithecia harenosa f. convallata Brandt, 1938

Species of moth

Eupithecia convallata is a moth in the family Geometridae. It is found in Afghanistan and Iran.

== Subspecies ==
- Eupithecia convallata convallata (Iran)
- Eupithecia convallata terricolor Vojnits, 1988 (Afghanistan)
