= Eupithecia corralensis =

Scientific classification
- Kingdom: Animalia
- Phylum: Arthropoda
- Class: Insecta
- Order: Lepidoptera
- Family: Geometridae
- Genus: Eupithecia
- Species: E. corralensis

Binomial name
- Eupithecia corralensis (Butler, 1882)

Synonyms
- Helastia corralensis Butler, 1882

Species of moth

Eupithecia corralensis is a moth in the family Geometridae. It is found in the Region of Los Lagos (Valdivia Province) in Chile. The habitat consists of the northern end of the Valdivian Forest Biotic Province.

The length of the forewings is about 8 mm for males. Adults have been recorded on wing in February.
