= Eupithecia placens =

Scientific classification
- Domain: Eukaryota
- Kingdom: Animalia
- Phylum: Arthropoda
- Class: Insecta
- Order: Lepidoptera
- Family: Geometridae
- Genus: Eupithecia
- Species: E. placens

Binomial name
- Eupithecia placens (Warren, 1906)

Synonyms
- Eucymatoge placens Warren, 1906

Species of moth

Eupithecia placens is a moth in the family Geometridae. It is found in New Guinea.

The wingspan is about 22–24 mm (0.87–0.94 in). The forewings are whitish green overlaid with grey. The hindwings are whitish grey with traces of lines and a paler submarginal band.
