= Eupithecia submiranda =

Scientific classification
- Domain: Eukaryota
- Kingdom: Animalia
- Phylum: Arthropoda
- Class: Insecta
- Order: Lepidoptera
- Family: Geometridae
- Genus: Eupithecia
- Species: E. submiranda

Binomial name
- Eupithecia submiranda (Warren, 1906)

Synonyms
- Tephroclystia submiranda Warren, 1906

Species of moth

Eupithecia submiranda is a moth in the family Geometridae. It is found in Suriname.

The wingspan is about 18 mm. The forewings are dingy olive-ochreous. The markings are dull dark grey. The hindwings are similar, but the grey markings are much duller.
