= Eupithecia oroba =

Scientific classification
- Domain: Eukaryota
- Kingdom: Animalia
- Phylum: Arthropoda
- Class: Insecta
- Order: Lepidoptera
- Family: Geometridae
- Genus: Eupithecia
- Species: E. oroba

Binomial name
- Eupithecia oroba H. Druce, 1893

Species of moth

Eupithecia oroba is a moth in the family Geometridae. It was described by Herbert Druce in 1893. It is known from eastern Mexico (Jalapa), Guatemala, and Panama.

The wingspan is about 25 mm (1 in). The forewings and hindwings are pale fawn-colored and crossed by fine indistinct waved brown lines.
