= Eupithecia coetulata =

Scientific classification
- Kingdom: Animalia
- Phylum: Arthropoda
- Clade: Pancrustacea
- Class: Insecta
- Order: Lepidoptera
- Family: Geometridae
- Genus: Eupithecia
- Species: E. coetulata

Binomial name
- Eupithecia coetulata Prout, 1916

Species of moth

Eupithecia coetulata is a moth in the family Geometridae. It is found in Peru.

The wingspan is 24 mm for males and 28 mm for females. The forewings rather glossy white, with mostly weak fuscous irroration. The markings are fuscous mixed with black. The hindwings are white, with about seven lines of more or less confluent spots.
