= Eupithecia petrohue =

Scientific classification
- Kingdom: Animalia
- Phylum: Arthropoda
- Class: Insecta
- Order: Lepidoptera
- Family: Geometridae
- Genus: Eupithecia
- Species: E. petrohue

Binomial name
- Eupithecia petrohue Rindge, 1987

Species of moth

Eupithecia petrohue is a moth in the family Geometridae. It is found in the Los Lagos Region (Llanquihue Province) in Chile. The habitat consists of the Valdivian Forest Biotic Province.

The length of the forewings is about 8.5 mm for males. Adults have been recorded on wing in January.

== Etymology ==
The specific name is based on the type locality.
