= Eupithecia aysenae =

Scientific classification
- Kingdom: Animalia
- Phylum: Arthropoda
- Class: Insecta
- Order: Lepidoptera
- Family: Geometridae
- Genus: Eupithecia
- Species: E. aysenae

Binomial name
- Eupithecia aysenae Rindge, 1987

Species of moth

Eupithecia aysenae is a moth in the family Geometridae. It is found in the Region of Campo (Coyhaique Province) in Chile. The habitat consists of the Aysen Cordillera Biotic Province.

The length of the forewings is about 9.5 mm for females. Adults have been recorded on wing in January.

== Etymology ==
The specific name is based on the type locality.
