= Eupithecia regulella =

Scientific classification
- Domain: Eukaryota
- Kingdom: Animalia
- Phylum: Arthropoda
- Class: Insecta
- Order: Lepidoptera
- Family: Geometridae
- Genus: Eupithecia
- Species: E. regulella

Binomial name
- Eupithecia regulella (Warren, 1907)

Synonyms
- Tephroclystia regulella Warren, 1907

Species of moth

Eupithecia regulella is a moth in the family Geometridae. It is found in Peru.

The wingspan is about 22 mm (0.87 in). The forewings are olive ochreous, crossed by a regular series of blackish grey lines. The hindwings are similar to the forewings.
