= Eupithecia brandti =

Scientific classification
- Kingdom: Animalia
- Phylum: Arthropoda
- Clade: Pancrustacea
- Class: Insecta
- Order: Lepidoptera
- Family: Geometridae
- Genus: Eupithecia
- Species: E. brandti

Binomial name
- Eupithecia brandti Ratzel & Mironov, 2012

Synonyms
- Eupithecia ssaadiata (manuscript name)

Species of moth

Eupithecia brandti is a moth in the family Geometridae. It is found in Iran (Fars).

The wingspan is about 17 mm.

== Etymology ==
The species is named in honour of the brothers Fred and Wilhelm Brandt.
