= Eupithecia anticura =

Scientific classification
- Kingdom: Animalia
- Phylum: Arthropoda
- Class: Insecta
- Order: Lepidoptera
- Family: Geometridae
- Genus: Eupithecia
- Species: E. anticura

Binomial name
- Eupithecia anticura Rindge, 1987

Species of moth

Eupithecia anticura is a moth in the family Geometridae. It is found in the Region of Los Lagos (Osorno Province) in Chile. The habitat consists of the Valdivian Forest Biotic Province.

The length of the forewings is about 8.5 mm for females. Adults have been recorded on wing in January.

== Etymology ==
The specific name is based on the type locality.
