= Eupithecia microptilota =

Scientific classification
- Domain: Eukaryota
- Kingdom: Animalia
- Phylum: Arthropoda
- Class: Insecta
- Order: Lepidoptera
- Family: Geometridae
- Genus: Eupithecia
- Species: E. microptilota

Binomial name
- Eupithecia microptilota (Warren, 1904)

Synonyms
- Chloroclystis microptilota Warren, 1904

Species of moth

Eupithecia microptilota is a moth in the family Geometridae. It is found in Peru.

The wingspan is about 15–17 mm. The forewings are pale greyish green with black lines. The hindwings whitish, without markings but with a long fringe.
