= Eupithecia halosydne =

Scientific classification
- Kingdom: Animalia
- Phylum: Arthropoda
- Clade: Pancrustacea
- Class: Insecta
- Order: Lepidoptera
- Family: Geometridae
- Genus: Eupithecia
- Species: E. halosydne

Binomial name
- Eupithecia halosydne Prout, 1922

Species of moth

Eupithecia halosydne is a moth in the family Geometridae. It is found on the Juan Fernandez Islands in Chile.

The length of the forewings is about 8–9 mm for females. The forewings are pale ochraceous brown. The hindwings are slightly paler than forewings. Adults have been recorded on wing in March.
