= Eupithecia mejala =

Scientific classification
- Domain: Eukaryota
- Kingdom: Animalia
- Phylum: Arthropoda
- Class: Insecta
- Order: Lepidoptera
- Family: Geometridae
- Genus: Eupithecia
- Species: E. mejala

Binomial name
- Eupithecia mejala Dognin, 1899

Synonyms
- Tephroclystia cymaenata Bastelberger, 1908; Tephroclystia infrequens Warren, 1906; Eupithecia producta Bastelberger, 1911

Species of moth

Eupithecia mejala is a moth in the family Geometridae. It is found in Ecuador, Bolivia and Peru.
