= Eupithecia fessa =

Scientific classification
- Kingdom: Animalia
- Phylum: Arthropoda
- Clade: Pancrustacea
- Class: Insecta
- Order: Lepidoptera
- Family: Geometridae
- Genus: Eupithecia
- Species: E. fessa

Binomial name
- Eupithecia fessa Mironov & Galsworthy, 2010

Synonyms
- Eupithecia pallescens Inoue, 2000 (preocc. by Eupithecia sinnosaria f. pallescens Dietze, 1910)

Species of moth

Eupithecia fessa is a moth in the family Geometridae. It is found in India (Darjeeling) and Nepal.
