= Eupithecia ochrosoma =

Scientific classification
- Domain: Eukaryota
- Kingdom: Animalia
- Phylum: Arthropoda
- Class: Insecta
- Order: Lepidoptera
- Family: Geometridae
- Genus: Eupithecia
- Species: E. ochrosoma

Binomial name
- Eupithecia ochrosoma (Warren, 1904)

Synonyms
- Eucymatoge ochrosoma Warren, 1904

Species of moth

Eupithecia ochrosoma is a moth in the family Geometridae. It is found in Peru.

The forewings are dull dark olive cinereous, with no distinct lines or markings. The hindwings are similar.
