= Eupithecia tenoensis =

Scientific classification
- Kingdom: Animalia
- Phylum: Arthropoda
- Class: Insecta
- Order: Lepidoptera
- Family: Geometridae
- Genus: Eupithecia
- Species: E. tenoensis

Binomial name
- Eupithecia tenoensis Rindge, 1987

Species of moth

Eupithecia tenoensis is a moth in the family Geometridae. It is found in the Region of Maule (Curico Province) in Chile. The habitat consists of either the Central Valley or the Northern Valdivian Forest biotic provinces.

The length of the forewings is about 8 mm for males. Adults have been recorded on wing in November.
