= Eupithecia versiplaga =

Scientific classification
- Domain: Eukaryota
- Kingdom: Animalia
- Phylum: Arthropoda
- Class: Insecta
- Order: Lepidoptera
- Family: Geometridae
- Genus: Eupithecia
- Species: E. versiplaga

Binomial name
- Eupithecia versiplaga (Warren, 1905)

Synonyms
- Eucymatoge versiplaga Warren, 1905

Species of moth

Eupithecia versiplaga is a moth in the family Geometridae. It is found in Peru.

The forewings are chalk-white and the markings are black. The hindwings are dull grey, with traces of darker cross-lines.
