= Eupithecia bandurriasae =

Scientific classification
- Kingdom: Animalia
- Phylum: Arthropoda
- Class: Insecta
- Order: Lepidoptera
- Family: Geometridae
- Genus: Eupithecia
- Species: E. bandurriasae

Binomial name
- Eupithecia bandurriasae Rindge, 1991

Species of moth

Eupithecia bandurriasae is a moth in the family Geometridae. It is found the Region of Campo (Coihaique Province) in Chile. The habitat consists of the Valdivian Forest Biotic Province.

The length of the forewings is about 8.5 mm for females. Adults have been recorded on wing in December.
