= Eupithecia viduata =

Scientific classification
- Domain: Eukaryota
- Kingdom: Animalia
- Phylum: Arthropoda
- Class: Insecta
- Order: Lepidoptera
- Family: Geometridae
- Genus: Eupithecia
- Species: E. viduata

Binomial name
- Eupithecia viduata (Warren, 1907)

Synonyms
- Tephroclystia viduata Warren, 1907

Species of moth

Eupithecia viduata is a moth in the family Geometridae. It is found in Peru.

The wingspan is about 27 mm. The forewings are blackish grey. The hindwings are paler and more transparent towards the costa.
