= Eupithecia anemica =

Scientific classification
- Kingdom: Animalia
- Phylum: Arthropoda
- Class: Insecta
- Order: Lepidoptera
- Family: Geometridae
- Genus: Eupithecia
- Species: E. anemica

Binomial name
- Eupithecia anemica Viidalepp, 1988

Synonyms
- Eupithecia anemica illustrata Kaila & Viidalepp, 1996

Species of moth

Eupithecia anemica is a moth in the family Geometridae. It is found in the mountains of southern Kazakhstan, Uzbekistan, Kirghizstan, Tajikistan and Pakistan.
