= Eupithecia achyrdaghica =

Scientific classification
- Domain: Eukaryota
- Kingdom: Animalia
- Phylum: Arthropoda
- Class: Insecta
- Order: Lepidoptera
- Family: Geometridae
- Genus: Eupithecia
- Species: E. achyrdaghica

Binomial name
- Eupithecia achyrdaghica Wehrli, 1929

Species of geometer moth

Eupithecia achyrdaghica is a moth in the family Geometridae first described by Eugen Wehrli in 1929. It is found in Turkey and Syria.

Wehrli gave a wingspan of 16–17 mm.
