= Eupithecia bifasciata =

Scientific classification
- Kingdom: Animalia
- Phylum: Arthropoda
- Clade: Pancrustacea
- Class: Insecta
- Order: Lepidoptera
- Family: Geometridae
- Genus: Eupithecia
- Species: E. bifasciata

Binomial name
- Eupithecia bifasciata (Warren, 1900)

Synonyms
- Dolichopyge bifasciata Warren, 1900; Eucymatoge segnis Schaus, 1929

Species of moth

Eupithecia bifasciata is a moth in the family Geometridae. It is found in Panama and Brazil.
