= Eupithecia canchasae =

Scientific classification
- Kingdom: Animalia
- Phylum: Arthropoda
- Class: Insecta
- Order: Lepidoptera
- Family: Geometridae
- Genus: Eupithecia
- Species: E. canchasae

Binomial name
- Eupithecia canchasae Rindge, 1987

Species of moth

Eupithecia canchasae is a moth in the family Geometridae. It is found in the region Santiago (Santiago Province) in Chile. The habitat consists of the Central Valley Biotic Province.

The length of the forewings is about 7.5 mm for males. Adults have been recorded on wing in December.
