= Eupithecia peguensis =

Scientific classification
- Kingdom: Animalia
- Phylum: Arthropoda
- Clade: Pancrustacea
- Class: Insecta
- Order: Lepidoptera
- Family: Geometridae
- Genus: Eupithecia
- Species: E. peguensis

Binomial name
- Eupithecia peguensis L.B. Prout, 1958

Synonyms
- Eupithecia torva Vojnits, 1983

Species of moth

Eupithecia peguensis is a moth in the family Geometridae. It is found in Nepal, Thailand, Vietnam (Upper Tonkin) and Myanmar.
