= Eupithecia cohorticula =

Scientific classification
- Domain: Eukaryota
- Kingdom: Animalia
- Phylum: Arthropoda
- Class: Insecta
- Order: Lepidoptera
- Family: Geometridae
- Genus: Eupithecia
- Species: E. cohorticula

Binomial name
- Eupithecia cohorticula Dietze, 1910

Species of moth

Eupithecia cohorticula is a moth in the family Geometridae. It is found in Kyrgyzstan. It has been recorded at elevations of 1,600–2,600 m (5,200–8,500 ft) above sea level flying in June–July.
