= Eupithecia recintoensis =

Scientific classification
- Kingdom: Animalia
- Phylum: Arthropoda
- Class: Insecta
- Order: Lepidoptera
- Family: Geometridae
- Genus: Eupithecia
- Species: E. recintoensis

Binomial name
- Eupithecia recintoensis Rindge, 1987

Species of moth

Eupithecia recintoensis is a moth in the family Geometridae. It is found in the Region of Biobio (Nuble Province) in Chile. The habitat consists of the Northern Valdivian Forest Biotic Province.

The length of the forewings is about 7 mm for females.
