= Eupithecia tabestana =

Scientific classification
- Kingdom: Animalia
- Phylum: Arthropoda
- Clade: Pancrustacea
- Class: Insecta
- Order: Lepidoptera
- Family: Geometridae
- Genus: Eupithecia
- Species: E. tabestana

Binomial name
- Eupithecia tabestana Mironov & Ratzel, 2012

Species of moth

Eupithecia tabestana is a moth in the family Geometridae. It is found in eastern Afghanistan, northern Pakistan, and central Nepal.

The wingspan is 15–17 mm (0.59–0.67 in).
