= Eupithecia undulataria =

Scientific classification
- Domain: Eukaryota
- Kingdom: Animalia
- Phylum: Arthropoda
- Class: Insecta
- Order: Lepidoptera
- Family: Geometridae
- Genus: Eupithecia
- Species: E. undulataria

Binomial name
- Eupithecia undulataria (Turati, 1934)

Synonyms
- Tephroclystia undulataria Turati, 1934; Tephroclystia aequistriaria Turati & Kruger, 1936

Species of moth

Eupithecia undulataria is a moth in the family Geometridae. It is found in Libya.
