= Eupithecia assimilis =

Scientific classification
- Domain: Eukaryota
- Kingdom: Animalia
- Phylum: Arthropoda
- Class: Insecta
- Order: Lepidoptera
- Family: Geometridae
- Genus: Eupithecia
- Species: E. assimilis

Binomial name
- Eupithecia assimilis (Warren, 1906)

Synonyms
- Sebastia assimilis Warren, 1906; Sebastia deldaria Warren, 1906

Species of moth

Eupithecia assimilis is a moth in the family Geometridae. It is found in French Guiana and Brazil.
