= Eupithecia concepcion =

Scientific classification
- Kingdom: Animalia
- Phylum: Arthropoda
- Class: Insecta
- Order: Lepidoptera
- Family: Geometridae
- Genus: Eupithecia
- Species: E. concepcion

Binomial name
- Eupithecia concepcion Rindge, 1991

Species of moth

Eupithecia concepcion is a moth in the family Geometridae. It is found the Region of Biobio (Concepcion Province) in Chile. The habitat consists of the Northern Valdivian Forest Biotic Province.

The length of the forewings is about 10 mm for females.
