= Eupithecia zagrosata =

Scientific classification
- Domain: Eukaryota
- Kingdom: Animalia
- Phylum: Arthropoda
- Class: Insecta
- Order: Lepidoptera
- Family: Geometridae
- Genus: Eupithecia
- Species: E. zagrosata

Binomial name
- Eupithecia zagrosata Mironov & Ratzel, 2012

Species of moth

Eupithecia zagrosata is a moth in the family Geometridae. It is found in Iran (the Zagros Mountains).

The wingspan is 18.5–21 millimetres (0.73–0.83 in).
