= Eupithecia spinibarbata =

Scientific classification
- Kingdom: Animalia
- Phylum: Arthropoda
- Clade: Pancrustacea
- Class: Insecta
- Order: Lepidoptera
- Family: Geometridae
- Genus: Eupithecia
- Species: E. spinibarbata

Binomial name
- Eupithecia spinibarbata Mironov & Galsworthy, 2010

Species of moth

Eupithecia spinibarbata is a moth in the family Geometridae. It is found in India (Darjeeling).

The wingspan is about 19 mm. The forewings are pale whitish grey.
