= Eupithecia feliscaudata =

Scientific classification
- Domain: Eukaryota
- Kingdom: Animalia
- Phylum: Arthropoda
- Class: Insecta
- Order: Lepidoptera
- Family: Geometridae
- Genus: Eupithecia
- Species: E. feliscaudata

Binomial name
- Eupithecia feliscaudata D. S. Fletcher, 1956

Species of moth

Eupithecia feliscaudata is a moth in the family Geometridae described by David Stephen Fletcher in 1956. It is found in Tanzania (it was described from Mount Kilimanjaro).
