= Eupithecia leucenthesis =

Scientific classification
- Kingdom: Animalia
- Phylum: Arthropoda
- Clade: Pancrustacea
- Class: Insecta
- Order: Lepidoptera
- Family: Geometridae
- Genus: Eupithecia
- Species: E. leucenthesis

Binomial name
- Eupithecia leucenthesis L.B. Prout, 1926

Synonyms
- Eupithecia albicans Vojnits, 1981

Species of moth

Eupithecia leucenthesis is a moth in the family Geometridae. It is found in northern Myanmar and Nepal.
