= Eupithecia russeola =

Scientific classification
- Domain: Eukaryota
- Kingdom: Animalia
- Phylum: Arthropoda
- Class: Insecta
- Order: Lepidoptera
- Family: Geometridae
- Genus: Eupithecia
- Species: E. russeola

Binomial name
- Eupithecia russeola L.B. Prout, 1926

Species of moth

Eupithecia russeola is a moth in the family Geometridae. It is found in northern Myanmar and northern Thailand.

Eupithecia russeola is a medium-sized species with orange-brown forewings and much paler hindwings.
