= Eupithecia efferata =

Scientific classification
- Kingdom: Animalia
- Phylum: Arthropoda
- Clade: Pancrustacea
- Class: Insecta
- Order: Lepidoptera
- Family: Geometridae
- Genus: Eupithecia
- Species: E. efferata

Binomial name
- Eupithecia efferata Mironov & Ratzel, 2008

Species of moth

Eupithecia efferata is a moth in the family Geometridae. It is found in Pakistan.

The wingspan is about 17.5–19 mm. The forewings are pale grey and the hindwings are whitish grey.
