= Eupithecia vinibua =

Scientific classification
- Kingdom: Animalia
- Phylum: Arthropoda
- Clade: Pancrustacea
- Class: Insecta
- Order: Lepidoptera
- Family: Geometridae
- Genus: Eupithecia
- Species: E. vinibua

Binomial name
- Eupithecia vinibua Mironov & Galsworthy, 2008

Species of moth

Eupithecia vinibua is a moth in the family Geometridae. It is found in Kashmir.

The wingspan is about 15.5 mm. The fore- and hindwings are dark greyish brown.
