= Eupithecia erecticoma =

Scientific classification
- Domain: Eukaryota
- Kingdom: Animalia
- Phylum: Arthropoda
- Class: Insecta
- Order: Lepidoptera
- Family: Geometridae
- Genus: Eupithecia
- Species: E. erecticoma

Binomial name
- Eupithecia erecticoma (Warren, 1907)

Synonyms
- Tephroclystia erecticoma Warren, 1907

Species of moth

Eupithecia erecticoma is a moth in the family Geometridae first described by William Warren in 1907. It is found in Peru.
