= Eupithecia maleformata =

Scientific classification
- Domain: Eukaryota
- Kingdom: Animalia
- Phylum: Arthropoda
- Class: Insecta
- Order: Lepidoptera
- Family: Geometridae
- Genus: Eupithecia
- Species: E. maleformata

Binomial name
- Eupithecia maleformata (Warren, 1895)

Synonyms
- Sebastia maleformata Warren, 1895; Sebastia humerata Warren, 1906

Species of moth

Eupithecia maleformata is a moth in the family Geometridae. It is found in Brazil.
