= Eupithecia panda =

Scientific classification
- Domain: Eukaryota
- Kingdom: Animalia
- Phylum: Arthropoda
- Class: Insecta
- Order: Lepidoptera
- Family: Geometridae
- Genus: Eupithecia
- Species: E. panda

Binomial name
- Eupithecia panda H. Druce, 1893

Synonyms
- Tephroclystia brunneicosta Warren, 1904

Species of moth

Eupithecia panda is a moth in the family Geometridae first described by Herbert Druce in 1893. It is found in Costa Rica and Peru.
