= Eupithecia vetula =

Scientific classification
- Kingdom: Animalia
- Phylum: Arthropoda
- Clade: Pancrustacea
- Class: Insecta
- Order: Lepidoptera
- Family: Geometridae
- Genus: Eupithecia
- Species: E. vetula

Binomial name
- Eupithecia vetula Mironov & Ratzel, 2008

Species of moth

Eupithecia vetula is a moth in the family Geometridae. It is found in Pakistan, northern India, and Afghanistan.

The wingspan is 16–20 mm (0.63–0.79 in).
