= Eupithecia cunina =

Scientific classification
- Domain: Eukaryota
- Kingdom: Animalia
- Phylum: Arthropoda
- Class: Insecta
- Order: Lepidoptera
- Family: Geometridae
- Genus: Eupithecia
- Species: E. cunina

Binomial name
- Eupithecia cunina (H. Druce, 1893)

Synonyms
- Psaliodes cunina H. Druce, 1893

Species of moth

Eupithecia cunina is a moth in the family Geometridae first described by Herbert Druce in 1893. It is found in Guatemala.
