= Eupithecia sexpunctata =

Scientific classification
- Domain: Eukaryota
- Kingdom: Animalia
- Phylum: Arthropoda
- Class: Insecta
- Order: Lepidoptera
- Family: Geometridae
- Genus: Eupithecia
- Species: E. sexpunctata

Binomial name
- Eupithecia sexpunctata (Dognin, 1902)

Synonyms
- Tephroclystia sexpunctata Dognin, 1902

Species of moth

Eupithecia sexpunctata is a moth in the family Geometridae. It is found in Ecuador.
