= Eupithecia brunneomarginata =

Scientific classification
- Kingdom: Animalia
- Phylum: Arthropoda
- Clade: Pancrustacea
- Class: Insecta
- Order: Lepidoptera
- Family: Geometridae
- Genus: Eupithecia
- Species: E. brunneomarginata

Binomial name
- Eupithecia brunneomarginata Mironov & Galsworthy, 2008

Species of moth

Eupithecia brunneomarginata is a moth in the family Geometridae. It is found in Pakistan.

The wingspan is about 17.5–19 mm.
