= Eupithecia rufipalpata =

Scientific classification
- Domain: Eukaryota
- Kingdom: Animalia
- Phylum: Arthropoda
- Class: Insecta
- Order: Lepidoptera
- Family: Geometridae
- Genus: Eupithecia
- Species: E. rufipalpata

Binomial name
- Eupithecia rufipalpata (Dognin, 1902)

Synonyms
- Tephroclystia rufipalpata Dognin, 1902

Species of moth

Eupithecia rufipalpata is a moth in the family Geometridae. It is found in Colombia.
