= Eupithecia stigmatophora =

Scientific classification
- Domain: Eukaryota
- Kingdom: Animalia
- Phylum: Arthropoda
- Class: Insecta
- Order: Lepidoptera
- Family: Geometridae
- Genus: Eupithecia
- Species: E. stigmatophora

Binomial name
- Eupithecia stigmatophora (Dognin, 1914)

Synonyms
- Tephroclystia stigmatophora Dognin, 1914

Species of moth

Eupithecia stigmatophora is a moth in the family Geometridae. It is found in Colombia.
