= Eupithecia albigutta =

Scientific classification
- Kingdom: Animalia
- Phylum: Arthropoda
- Clade: Pancrustacea
- Class: Insecta
- Order: Lepidoptera
- Family: Geometridae
- Genus: Eupithecia
- Species: E. albigutta

Binomial name
- Eupithecia albigutta L.B. Prout, 1958

Synonyms
- Eupithecia pulla Vojnits, 1988

Species of moth

Eupithecia albigutta is a moth in the family Geometridae. It is found in the Himalaya and Taiwan.
