= Eupithecia collineata =

Scientific classification
- Domain: Eukaryota
- Kingdom: Animalia
- Phylum: Arthropoda
- Class: Insecta
- Order: Lepidoptera
- Family: Geometridae
- Genus: Eupithecia
- Species: E. collineata

Binomial name
- Eupithecia collineata (Warren, 1906)

Synonyms
- Tephroclystia collineata Warren, 1906; Eupithecia argica Prout, 1910

Species of moth

Eupithecia collineata is a moth in the family Geometridae. It is found in Argentina.
