= Eupithecia elimata =

Scientific classification
- Domain: Eukaryota
- Kingdom: Animalia
- Phylum: Arthropoda
- Class: Insecta
- Order: Lepidoptera
- Family: Geometridae
- Genus: Eupithecia
- Species: E. elimata

Binomial name
- Eupithecia elimata Dietze, 1906

Synonyms
- Eupithecia sebdouensis Dietze, 1910

Species of moth

Eupithecia elimata is a moth in the family Geometridae first described by Karl Dietze in 1906. It is found in Algeria.
