= Eupithecia rhombipennis =

Scientific classification
- Kingdom: Animalia
- Phylum: Arthropoda
- Clade: Pancrustacea
- Class: Insecta
- Order: Lepidoptera
- Family: Geometridae
- Genus: Eupithecia
- Species: E. rhombipennis

Binomial name
- Eupithecia rhombipennis (Prout, 1911)

Synonyms
- Tephroclystia rhombipennis Prout, 1911

Species of moth

Eupithecia rhombipennis is a moth in the family Geometridae. It is found in Colombia.
