= Eupithecia erectinota =

Scientific classification
- Domain: Eukaryota
- Kingdom: Animalia
- Phylum: Arthropoda
- Class: Insecta
- Order: Lepidoptera
- Family: Geometridae
- Genus: Eupithecia
- Species: E. erectinota

Binomial name
- Eupithecia erectinota (Warren, 1904)

Synonyms
- Tephroclystia erectinota Warren, 1904

Species of moth

Eupithecia erectinota is a moth in the family Geometridae first described by William Warren in 1904. It is found in Peru.
