= Eupithecia idaeoides =

Scientific classification
- Kingdom: Animalia
- Phylum: Arthropoda
- Clade: Pancrustacea
- Class: Insecta
- Order: Lepidoptera
- Family: Geometridae
- Genus: Eupithecia
- Species: E. idaeoides

Binomial name
- Eupithecia idaeoides Mironov & Galsworthy, 2010

Species of moth

Eupithecia idaeoides is a moth in the family Geometridae. It is found in southern India (West Bengal and Sikkim).

The wingspan is about 16 mm.
