= Eupithecia bullata =

Scientific classification
- Domain: Eukaryota
- Kingdom: Animalia
- Phylum: Arthropoda
- Class: Insecta
- Order: Lepidoptera
- Family: Geometridae
- Genus: Eupithecia
- Species: E. bullata

Binomial name
- Eupithecia bullata (Warren, 1895)

Synonyms
- Dochephora bullata Warren, 1895; Dochephora nudata Warren, 1906

Species of moth

Eupithecia bullata is a moth in the family Geometridae. It is found in Brazil.
