= Eupithecia minimaria =

Scientific classification
- Domain: Eukaryota
- Kingdom: Animalia
- Phylum: Arthropoda
- Class: Insecta
- Order: Lepidoptera
- Family: Geometridae
- Genus: Eupithecia
- Species: E. minimaria

Binomial name
- Eupithecia minimaria (Turati, 1927)

Synonyms
- Tephroclystia minimaria Turati, 1927

Species of moth

Eupithecia minimaria is a moth in the family Geometridae first described by Turati in 1927. It is found in Libya.
