= Eupithecia pallidicosta =

Scientific classification
- Domain: Eukaryota
- Kingdom: Animalia
- Phylum: Arthropoda
- Class: Insecta
- Order: Lepidoptera
- Family: Geometridae
- Genus: Eupithecia
- Species: E. pallidicosta

Binomial name
- Eupithecia pallidicosta (Warren, 1904)

Synonyms
- Tephroclystia pallidicosta Warren, 1904

Species of moth

Eupithecia pallidicosta is a moth in the family Geometridae. It is found in Peru.
