= Eupithecia phaea =

Scientific classification
- Kingdom: Animalia
- Phylum: Arthropoda
- Clade: Pancrustacea
- Class: Insecta
- Order: Lepidoptera
- Family: Geometridae
- Genus: Eupithecia
- Species: E. phaea

Binomial name
- Eupithecia phaea Mironov & Galsworthy, 2008

Species of moth

Eupithecia phaea is a moth in the family Geometridae. It is found in Mongolia.

The wingspan is about 19 mm. The fore and hindwings are pale whitish grey.
