= Eupithecia scortillata =

Scientific classification
- Domain: Eukaryota
- Kingdom: Animalia
- Phylum: Arthropoda
- Class: Insecta
- Order: Lepidoptera
- Family: Geometridae
- Genus: Eupithecia
- Species: E. scortillata

Binomial name
- Eupithecia scortillata Dietze, 1904

Synonyms
- Eupithecia subscortillata Viidalepp, 1988

Species of moth

Eupithecia scortillata is a moth in the family Geometridae, found in Iran and Kyrgyzstan.
