= Eupithecia chilensis =

Scientific classification
- Kingdom: Animalia
- Phylum: Arthropoda
- Class: Insecta
- Order: Lepidoptera
- Family: Geometridae
- Genus: Eupithecia
- Species: E. chilensis

Binomial name
- Eupithecia chilensis Kemal & Kocak, 2004

Synonyms
- Eupithecia rindgei Vojnits, 1992 (preocc. McDunnough, 1949)

Species of moth

Eupithecia chilensis is a moth in the family Geometridae. It is found in Chile.
