= Eupithecia hormiga =

Scientific classification
- Domain: Eukaryota
- Kingdom: Animalia
- Phylum: Arthropoda
- Class: Insecta
- Order: Lepidoptera
- Family: Geometridae
- Genus: Eupithecia
- Species: E. hormiga

Binomial name
- Eupithecia hormiga Dognin, 1899

Synonyms
- Tephroclystia conigera Bastelberger, 1908

Species of moth

Eupithecia hormiga is a moth in the family Geometridae. It is found in Ecuador and Bolivia.
