= Eupithecia inoueata =

Scientific classification
- Kingdom: Animalia
- Phylum: Arthropoda
- Clade: Pancrustacea
- Class: Insecta
- Order: Lepidoptera
- Family: Geometridae
- Genus: Eupithecia
- Species: E. inoueata

Binomial name
- Eupithecia inoueata Galsworthy & Mironov, 2005

Species of moth

Eupithecia inoueata is a moth in the family Geometridae. It is found in Nepal, north-eastern India and Bhutan.

The wingspan is about 20 mm.
