= Eupithecia furvipennis =

Scientific classification
- Domain: Eukaryota
- Kingdom: Animalia
- Phylum: Arthropoda
- Class: Insecta
- Order: Lepidoptera
- Family: Geometridae
- Genus: Eupithecia
- Species: E. furvipennis

Binomial name
- Eupithecia furvipennis (Dognin, 1906)

Synonyms
- Tephroclystia furvipennis Dognin, 1906

Species of moth

Eupithecia furvipennis is a moth in the family Geometridae. It is found in Argentina.
