= Eupithecia singhalensis =

Scientific classification
- Kingdom: Animalia
- Phylum: Arthropoda
- Clade: Pancrustacea
- Class: Insecta
- Order: Lepidoptera
- Family: Geometridae
- Genus: Eupithecia
- Species: E. singhalensis

Binomial name
- Eupithecia singhalensis Mironov & Galsworthy, 2010

Species of moth

Eupithecia singhalensis is a moth in the family Geometridae. It is found in Sri Lanka.

The moth's wingspan is about 18.5 mm.
