= Eupithecia infestata =

Scientific classification
- Domain: Eukaryota
- Kingdom: Animalia
- Phylum: Arthropoda
- Class: Insecta
- Order: Lepidoptera
- Family: Geometridae
- Genus: Eupithecia
- Species: E. infestata

Binomial name
- Eupithecia infestata C. Swinhoe, 1890

Species of moth

Eupithecia infestata is a moth in the family Geometridae first described by Charles Swinhoe in 1890. It is found in the hills of southern India.

The wingspan is about 21 mm.
