= Eupithecia longifimbria =

Scientific classification
- Domain: Eukaryota
- Kingdom: Animalia
- Phylum: Arthropoda
- Class: Insecta
- Order: Lepidoptera
- Family: Geometridae
- Genus: Eupithecia
- Species: E. longifimbria

Binomial name
- Eupithecia longifimbria (Warren, 1897)

Synonyms
- Tephroclystia longifimbria Warren, 1897

Species of moth

Eupithecia longifimbria is a moth in the family Geometridae. It is found in Brazil.
