= Eupithecia atromaculata =

Scientific classification
- Domain: Eukaryota
- Kingdom: Animalia
- Phylum: Arthropoda
- Class: Insecta
- Order: Lepidoptera
- Family: Geometridae
- Genus: Eupithecia
- Species: E. atromaculata

Binomial name
- Eupithecia atromaculata (Warren, 1907)

Synonyms
- Tephroclystia atromaculata Warren, 1907

Species of moth

Eupithecia atromaculata is a moth in the family Geometridae. It is found in Peru.
