= Eupithecia corticata =

Scientific classification
- Domain: Eukaryota
- Kingdom: Animalia
- Phylum: Arthropoda
- Class: Insecta
- Order: Lepidoptera
- Family: Geometridae
- Genus: Eupithecia
- Species: E. corticata

Binomial name
- Eupithecia corticata D. S. Fletcher, 1950

Species of moth

Eupithecia corticata is a moth in the family Geometridae described by David Stephen Fletcher in 1950. It is found in the Democratic Republic of the Congo and Uganda.
