= Eupithecia marmaricata =

Scientific classification
- Domain: Eukaryota
- Kingdom: Animalia
- Phylum: Arthropoda
- Class: Insecta
- Order: Lepidoptera
- Family: Geometridae
- Genus: Eupithecia
- Species: E. marmaricata

Binomial name
- Eupithecia marmaricata (Turati, 1922)

Synonyms
- Tephroclystia marmaricata Turati, 1922

Species of moth

Eupithecia marmaricata is a moth in the family Geometridae. It is found in Libya.
