= Eupithecia albirasa =

Scientific classification
- Domain: Eukaryota
- Kingdom: Animalia
- Phylum: Arthropoda
- Class: Insecta
- Order: Lepidoptera
- Family: Geometridae
- Genus: Eupithecia
- Species: E. albirasa

Binomial name
- Eupithecia albirasa (Warren, 1905)

Synonyms
- Perizoma albirasa Warren, 1905

Species of moth

Eupithecia albirasa is a moth in the family Geometridae. It is found in Peru and Ecuador.
