= Eupithecia bestia =

Scientific classification
- Kingdom: Animalia
- Phylum: Arthropoda
- Clade: Pancrustacea
- Class: Insecta
- Order: Lepidoptera
- Family: Geometridae
- Genus: Eupithecia
- Species: E. bestia

Binomial name
- Eupithecia bestia Mironov & Galsworthy, 2008

Species of moth

Eupithecia bestia is a moth in the family Geometridae. It is found in Pakistan (the Karakoram Mountains).

The wingspan is about 22 mm.
