= Eupithecia jacksoni =

Scientific classification
- Kingdom: Animalia
- Phylum: Arthropoda
- Clade: Pancrustacea
- Class: Insecta
- Order: Lepidoptera
- Family: Geometridae
- Genus: Eupithecia
- Species: E. jacksoni

Binomial name
- Eupithecia jacksoni D. S. Fletcher, 1956

Species of moth

Eupithecia jacksoni is a moth in the family Geometridae. It was described by David Stephen Fletcher in 1956 and it is found in Kenya.
