= Eupithecia nusret =

Scientific classification
- Domain: Eukaryota
- Kingdom: Animalia
- Phylum: Arthropoda
- Class: Insecta
- Order: Lepidoptera
- Family: Geometridae
- Genus: Eupithecia
- Species: E. nusret

Binomial name
- Eupithecia nusret Kocak, 2004

Synonyms
- Eupithecia placens Schaus, 1913 (preocc.)

Species of moth

Eupithecia nusret is a moth in the family Geometridae. It is found in Costa Rica.
