= Eupithecia saphenes =

Scientific classification
- Domain: Eukaryota
- Kingdom: Animalia
- Phylum: Arthropoda
- Class: Insecta
- Order: Lepidoptera
- Family: Geometridae
- Genus: Eupithecia
- Species: E. saphenes

Binomial name
- Eupithecia saphenes Prout, 1916

Species of moth

Eupithecia saphenes is a moth in the family Geometridae. It is found in Venezuela.

The wingspan is about 20 mm for females. The forewings are tinged with reddish.
