= Eupithecia dentosa =

Scientific classification
- Domain: Eukaryota
- Kingdom: Animalia
- Phylum: Arthropoda
- Class: Insecta
- Order: Lepidoptera
- Family: Geometridae
- Genus: Eupithecia
- Species: E. dentosa

Binomial name
- Eupithecia dentosa (Warren, 1900)

Synonyms
- Tephroclystia dentosa Warren, 1900

Species of moth

Eupithecia dentosa is a moth in the family Geometridae. It is found in Ecuador.
