= Eupithecia kibatiata =

Scientific classification
- Domain: Eukaryota
- Kingdom: Animalia
- Phylum: Arthropoda
- Class: Insecta
- Order: Lepidoptera
- Family: Geometridae
- Genus: Eupithecia
- Species: E. kibatiata

Binomial name
- Eupithecia kibatiata Debauche, 1938

Species of moth

Eupithecia kibatiata is a moth in the family Geometridae. It is found in the Democratic Republic of Congo, Kenya, Tanzania and Uganda.
