= Eupithecia perciliata =

Scientific classification
- Domain: Eukaryota
- Kingdom: Animalia
- Phylum: Arthropoda
- Class: Insecta
- Order: Lepidoptera
- Family: Geometridae
- Genus: Eupithecia
- Species: E. perciliata

Binomial name
- Eupithecia perciliata (Warren, 1901)

Synonyms
- Tephroclystia perciliata Warren, 1901

Species of moth

Eupithecia perciliata is a moth in the family Geometridae. It is found in Venezuela.
