= Eupithecia vinaceata =

Scientific classification
- Domain: Eukaryota
- Kingdom: Animalia
- Phylum: Arthropoda
- Class: Insecta
- Order: Lepidoptera
- Family: Geometridae
- Genus: Eupithecia
- Species: E. vinaceata

Binomial name
- Eupithecia vinaceata D. S. Fletcher, 1956

Species of moth

Eupithecia vinaceata is a moth in the family Geometridae. It was described by David Stephen Fletcher in 1956. It is found in Kenya.
