= Eupithecia amathes =

Scientific classification
- Kingdom: Animalia
- Phylum: Arthropoda
- Clade: Pancrustacea
- Class: Insecta
- Order: Lepidoptera
- Family: Geometridae
- Genus: Eupithecia
- Species: E. amathes

Binomial name
- Eupithecia amathes L. B. Prout, 1926

Species of moth

Eupithecia amathes is a moth in the family Geometridae first described by Louis Beethoven Prout in 1926. It is found in the Democratic Republic of the Congo.
