= Eupithecia bialbata =

Scientific classification
- Domain: Eukaryota
- Kingdom: Animalia
- Phylum: Arthropoda
- Class: Insecta
- Order: Lepidoptera
- Family: Geometridae
- Genus: Eupithecia
- Species: E. bialbata

Binomial name
- Eupithecia bialbata (Warren, 1901)

Synonyms
- Tephroclystia bialbata Warren, 1901

Species of moth

Eupithecia bialbata is a moth in the family Geometridae. It is found in Brazil.
