= Eupithecia albiceps =

Scientific classification
- Domain: Eukaryota
- Kingdom: Animalia
- Phylum: Arthropoda
- Class: Insecta
- Order: Lepidoptera
- Family: Geometridae
- Genus: Eupithecia
- Species: E. albiceps

Binomial name
- Eupithecia albiceps (Warren, 1905)

Synonyms
- Tephroclystia albiceps Warren, 1905

Species of moth

Eupithecia albiceps is a moth in the family Geometridae. It is found in Peru.
