= Eupithecia cugiai =

Scientific classification
- Domain: Eukaryota
- Kingdom: Animalia
- Phylum: Arthropoda
- Class: Insecta
- Order: Lepidoptera
- Family: Geometridae
- Genus: Eupithecia
- Species: E. cugiai

Binomial name
- Eupithecia cugiai (Turati, 1927)

Synonyms
- Tephroclystia cugiai Turati, 1927

Species of moth

Eupithecia cugiai is a moth in the family Geometridae. It is found in Libya.
