= Eupithecia meandrata =

Scientific classification
- Domain: Eukaryota
- Kingdom: Animalia
- Phylum: Arthropoda
- Class: Insecta
- Order: Lepidoptera
- Family: Geometridae
- Genus: Eupithecia
- Species: E. meandrata

Binomial name
- Eupithecia meandrata (Turati, 1924)

Synonyms
- Tephroclystia meandrata Turati, 1924

Species of moth

Eupithecia meandrata is a moth in the family Geometridae. It is found in Libya.
