= Eupithecia obscurata =

Scientific classification
- Domain: Eukaryota
- Kingdom: Animalia
- Phylum: Arthropoda
- Class: Insecta
- Order: Lepidoptera
- Family: Geometridae
- Genus: Eupithecia
- Species: E. obscurata

Binomial name
- Eupithecia obscurata (Warren, 1906)

Synonyms
- Dochephora obscurata Warren, 1906

Species of moth

Eupithecia obscurata is a moth in the family Geometridae. It is found in French Guiana.
