= Eupithecia peregrina =

Scientific classification
- Domain: Eukaryota
- Kingdom: Animalia
- Phylum: Arthropoda
- Class: Insecta
- Order: Lepidoptera
- Family: Geometridae
- Genus: Eupithecia
- Species: E. peregrina

Binomial name
- Eupithecia peregrina (Warren, 1904)

Synonyms
- Trichoclystis peregrina Warren, 1904

Species of moth

Eupithecia peregrina is a moth in the family Geometridae. It is found in Peru.
