= Eupithecia cuprearia =

Scientific classification
- Domain: Eukaryota
- Kingdom: Animalia
- Phylum: Arthropoda
- Class: Insecta
- Order: Lepidoptera
- Family: Geometridae
- Genus: Eupithecia
- Species: E. cuprearia

Binomial name
- Eupithecia cuprearia E. D. Jones, 1921

Species of moth

Eupithecia cuprearia is a moth in the family Geometridae first described by E. Dukinfield Jones in 1921. It is found in Brazil.
