= Eupithecia dissobapta =

Scientific classification
- Kingdom: Animalia
- Phylum: Arthropoda
- Clade: Pancrustacea
- Class: Insecta
- Order: Lepidoptera
- Family: Geometridae
- Genus: Eupithecia
- Species: E. dissobapta

Binomial name
- Eupithecia dissobapta Prout, 1932

Species of moth

Eupithecia dissobapta is a moth in the family Geometridae. It is found in eastern Madagascar.

This species has a wingspan of 13-14mm.
