= Eupithecia karakasykensis =

Scientific classification
- Domain: Eukaryota
- Kingdom: Animalia
- Phylum: Arthropoda
- Class: Insecta
- Order: Lepidoptera
- Family: Geometridae
- Genus: Eupithecia
- Species: E. karakasykensis

Binomial name
- Eupithecia karakasykensis Viidalepp, 1988

Species of moth

Eupithecia karakasykensis is a moth in the family Geometridae. It was described from the upper part of Kok-Suu-Western River gorge.
