= Eupithecia discordans =

Scientific classification
- Domain: Eukaryota
- Kingdom: Animalia
- Phylum: Arthropoda
- Class: Insecta
- Order: Lepidoptera
- Family: Geometridae
- Genus: Eupithecia
- Species: E. discordans

Binomial name
- Eupithecia discordans (Schaus, 1913)

Synonyms
- Dochephora discordans Schaus, 1913

Species of moth

Eupithecia discordans is a moth in the family Geometridae. It is found in Costa Rica.
