= Eupithecia thomasi =

Scientific classification
- Kingdom: Animalia
- Phylum: Arthropoda
- Clade: Pancrustacea
- Class: Insecta
- Order: Lepidoptera
- Family: Geometridae
- Genus: Eupithecia
- Species: E. thomasi

Binomial name
- Eupithecia thomasi Mironov & Galsworthy, 2008

Species of moth

Eupithecia thomasi is a moth in the family Geometridae. It is found in India (Darjeeling, Sikkim) and Nepal.
