= Eupithecia antaria =

Scientific classification
- Kingdom: Animalia
- Phylum: Arthropoda
- Clade: Pancrustacea
- Class: Insecta
- Order: Lepidoptera
- Family: Geometridae
- Genus: Eupithecia
- Species: E. antaria

Binomial name
- Eupithecia antaria (Warren, 1906)

Synonyms
- Tephroclystia antaria Warren, 1906

Species of moth

Eupithecia antaria is a moth in the family Geometridae. It is found in Brazil.
