= Eupithecia rulena =

Scientific classification
- Kingdom: Animalia
- Phylum: Arthropoda
- Clade: Pancrustacea
- Class: Insecta
- Order: Lepidoptera
- Family: Geometridae
- Genus: Eupithecia
- Species: E. rulena

Binomial name
- Eupithecia rulena Mironov & Galsworthy, 2010

Species of moth

Eupithecia rulena is a moth in the family Geometridae. It is found in Nepal.

The wingspan is about 16.5–18 mm.
