= Eupithecia evansi =

Scientific classification
- Domain: Eukaryota
- Kingdom: Animalia
- Phylum: Arthropoda
- Class: Insecta
- Order: Lepidoptera
- Family: Geometridae
- Genus: Eupithecia
- Species: E. evansi

Binomial name
- Eupithecia evansi D. S. Fletcher, 1958

Species of moth

Eupithecia evansi is a moth in the family Geometridae. It was described by David Stephen Fletcher in 1958 and it is found in Uganda.
