= Eupithecia tarensis =

Scientific classification
- Domain: Eukaryota
- Kingdom: Animalia
- Phylum: Arthropoda
- Class: Insecta
- Order: Lepidoptera
- Family: Geometridae
- Genus: Eupithecia
- Species: E. tarensis

Binomial name
- Eupithecia tarensis Schwingenschuss, 1939

Species of moth

Eupithecia tarensis is a moth in the family Geometridae first described by Leo Schwingenschuss in 1939. It is found in Iran.
