= Eupithecia virescens =

Scientific classification
- Domain: Eukaryota
- Kingdom: Animalia
- Phylum: Arthropoda
- Class: Insecta
- Order: Lepidoptera
- Family: Geometridae
- Genus: Eupithecia
- Species: E. virescens

Binomial name
- Eupithecia virescens (Warren, 1900)

Synonyms
- Stenopla virescens Warren, 1900

Species of moth

Eupithecia virescens is a moth in the family Geometridae. It is found in Brazil.
