= Eupithecia astales =

Scientific classification
- Domain: Eukaryota
- Kingdom: Animalia
- Phylum: Arthropoda
- Class: Insecta
- Order: Lepidoptera
- Family: Geometridae
- Genus: Eupithecia
- Species: E. astales

Binomial name
- Eupithecia astales D. S. Fletcher, 1978

Species of moth

Eupithecia astales is a moth in the family Geometridae. It was described by David Stephen Fletcher in 1978 and it is found in Tanzania.
