= Eupithecia yathomi =

Scientific classification
- Domain: Eukaryota
- Kingdom: Animalia
- Phylum: Arthropoda
- Class: Insecta
- Order: Lepidoptera
- Family: Geometridae
- Genus: Eupithecia
- Species: E. yathomi

Binomial name
- Eupithecia yathomi Hausmann, 1991

Species of moth

Eupithecia yathomi is a moth in the family Geometridae. It is found in Jordan.

The wingspan is about 13.5 mm.
