= Eupithecia albertiata =

Scientific classification
- Domain: Eukaryota
- Kingdom: Animalia
- Phylum: Arthropoda
- Class: Insecta
- Order: Lepidoptera
- Family: Geometridae
- Genus: Eupithecia
- Species: E. albertiata

Binomial name
- Eupithecia albertiata Schutze, 1961

Species of moth

Eupithecia albertiata is a moth in the family Geometridae. It is found in Tajikistan.

The wingspan is about 18 mm.
