= Eupithecia robinsoni =

Scientific classification
- Kingdom: Animalia
- Phylum: Arthropoda
- Class: Insecta
- Order: Lepidoptera
- Family: Geometridae
- Genus: Eupithecia
- Species: E. robinsoni

Binomial name
- Eupithecia robinsoni Parra & Ibarra-Vidal, 2002

Species of moth

Eupithecia robinsoni is a moth in the family Geometridae. It is found on the Juan Fernández Islands in Chile.
