= Eupithecia soricella =

Scientific classification
- Domain: Eukaryota
- Kingdom: Animalia
- Phylum: Arthropoda
- Class: Insecta
- Order: Lepidoptera
- Family: Geometridae
- Genus: Eupithecia
- Species: E. soricella

Binomial name
- Eupithecia soricella D. Lucas, 1938

Species of moth

Eupithecia soricella is a moth in the family Geometridae first described by Daniel Lucas in 1938. It is found in Algeria.
