= Eupithecia niveivena =

Scientific classification
- Kingdom: Animalia
- Phylum: Arthropoda
- Clade: Pancrustacea
- Class: Insecta
- Order: Lepidoptera
- Family: Geometridae
- Genus: Eupithecia
- Species: E. niveivena

Binomial name
- Eupithecia niveivena L.B. Prout, 1928

Species of moth

Eupithecia niveivena is a moth in the family Geometridae. It is found in Sri Lanka and Thailand.
