= Eupithecia idalia =

Scientific classification
- Domain: Eukaryota
- Kingdom: Animalia
- Phylum: Arthropoda
- Class: Insecta
- Order: Lepidoptera
- Family: Geometridae
- Genus: Eupithecia
- Species: E. idalia

Binomial name
- Eupithecia idalia Dognin, 1890

Species of moth

Eupithecia idalia is a moth in the family Geometridae first described by Paul Dognin in 1890. It is found in Ecuador.
