= Eupithecia nabagulensis =

Scientific classification
- Kingdom: Animalia
- Phylum: Arthropoda
- Clade: Pancrustacea
- Class: Insecta
- Order: Lepidoptera
- Family: Geometridae
- Genus: Eupithecia
- Species: E. nabagulensis

Binomial name
- Eupithecia nabagulensis Prout L.B., 1935

Species of moth

Eupithecia nabagulensis is a moth in the family Geometridae. It is found in Uganda.
