= Eupithecia falkenbergi =

Scientific classification
- Domain: Eukaryota
- Kingdom: Animalia
- Phylum: Arthropoda
- Class: Insecta
- Order: Lepidoptera
- Family: Geometridae
- Genus: Eupithecia
- Species: E. falkenbergi

Binomial name
- Eupithecia falkenbergi Ratzel, 2011

Species of moth

Eupithecia falkenbergi is a moth in the family Geometridae. It is found in Bhutan.
