= Eupithecia caliginosa =

Scientific classification
- Domain: Eukaryota
- Kingdom: Animalia
- Phylum: Arthropoda
- Class: Insecta
- Order: Lepidoptera
- Family: Geometridae
- Genus: Eupithecia
- Species: E. caliginosa

Binomial name
- Eupithecia caliginosa Schaus, 1913

Species of moth

Eupithecia caliginosa is a moth in the family Geometridae. It is found in Costa Rica.
