= Eupithecia somereni =

Scientific classification
- Kingdom: Animalia
- Phylum: Arthropoda
- Clade: Pancrustacea
- Class: Insecta
- Order: Lepidoptera
- Family: Geometridae
- Genus: Eupithecia
- Species: E. somereni

Binomial name
- Eupithecia somereni L. B. Prout, 1935

Species of moth

Eupithecia somereni is a moth in the family Geometridae. It is found in Kenya and Uganda.
