= Eupithecia wilemani =

Scientific classification
- Kingdom: Animalia
- Phylum: Arthropoda
- Clade: Pancrustacea
- Class: Insecta
- Order: Lepidoptera
- Family: Geometridae
- Genus: Eupithecia
- Species: E. wilemani

Binomial name
- Eupithecia wilemani Prout, 1931

Species of moth

Eupithecia wilemani is a moth in the family Geometridae. It is found in Philippines (Luzon).
