= Eupithecia dominaria =

Scientific classification
- Domain: Eukaryota
- Kingdom: Animalia
- Phylum: Arthropoda
- Class: Insecta
- Order: Lepidoptera
- Family: Geometridae
- Genus: Eupithecia
- Species: E. dominaria

Binomial name
- Eupithecia dominaria Shchetkin, 1956

Species of moth

Eupithecia dominaria is a moth in the family Geometridae. It is found in Tajikistan.
