= Eupithecia hamleti =

Scientific classification
- Domain: Eukaryota
- Kingdom: Animalia
- Phylum: Arthropoda
- Class: Insecta
- Order: Lepidoptera
- Family: Geometridae
- Genus: Eupithecia
- Species: E. hamleti

Binomial name
- Eupithecia hamleti Vardikjan, 1985

Species of moth

Eupithecia hamleti is a moth in the family Geometridae. It is found in Armenia.
