= Eupithecia antalica =

Scientific classification
- Kingdom: Animalia
- Phylum: Arthropoda
- Clade: Pancrustacea
- Class: Insecta
- Order: Lepidoptera
- Family: Geometridae
- Genus: Eupithecia
- Species: E. antalica

Binomial name
- Eupithecia antalica Mironov, 2001

Species of moth

Eupithecia antalica is a moth in the family Geometridae. It is found in Greece and the Near East.
