= Eupithecia lissopis =

Scientific classification
- Kingdom: Animalia
- Phylum: Arthropoda
- Clade: Pancrustacea
- Class: Insecta
- Order: Lepidoptera
- Family: Geometridae
- Genus: Eupithecia
- Species: E. lissopis

Binomial name
- Eupithecia lissopis Prout, 1958

Species of moth

Eupithecia lissopis is a moth in the family Geometridae. It is found in New Guinea.
