= Eupithecia niticallis =

Scientific classification
- Domain: Eukaryota
- Kingdom: Animalia
- Phylum: Arthropoda
- Class: Insecta
- Order: Lepidoptera
- Family: Geometridae
- Genus: Eupithecia
- Species: E. niticallis

Binomial name
- Eupithecia niticallis Krüger, 2007

Species of moth

Eupithecia niticallis is a moth in the family Geometridae. It is found in South Africa.
