= Eupithecia pindosata =

Scientific classification
- Domain: Eukaryota
- Kingdom: Animalia
- Phylum: Arthropoda
- Class: Insecta
- Order: Lepidoptera
- Family: Geometridae
- Genus: Eupithecia
- Species: E. pindosata

Binomial name
- Eupithecia pindosata Weidlich, 2008

Species of moth

Eupithecia pindosata is a moth in the family Geometridae. It is found in Greece.
