= Eupithecia profuga =

Scientific classification
- Kingdom: Animalia
- Phylum: Arthropoda
- Clade: Pancrustacea
- Class: Insecta
- Order: Lepidoptera
- Family: Geometridae
- Genus: Eupithecia
- Species: E. profuga

Binomial name
- Eupithecia profuga L. B. Prout, 1931

Species of moth

Eupithecia profuga is a moth in the family Geometridae. It is found in Somalia.
