= Eupithecia problematicata =

Scientific classification
- Domain: Eukaryota
- Kingdom: Animalia
- Phylum: Arthropoda
- Class: Insecta
- Order: Lepidoptera
- Family: Geometridae
- Genus: Eupithecia
- Species: E. problematicata

Binomial name
- Eupithecia problematicata Schütze, 1960

Species of moth

Eupithecia problematicata is a moth in the family Geometridae. It is found in Iran.
