= Eupithecia delozona =

Scientific classification
- Kingdom: Animalia
- Phylum: Arthropoda
- Clade: Pancrustacea
- Class: Insecta
- Order: Lepidoptera
- Family: Geometridae
- Genus: Eupithecia
- Species: E. delozona

Binomial name
- Eupithecia delozona Prout, 1926

Species of moth

Eupithecia delozona is a moth in the family Geometridae. It is found on Borneo.
