= Eupithecia latifurcata =

Scientific classification
- Kingdom: Animalia
- Phylum: Arthropoda
- Class: Insecta
- Order: Lepidoptera
- Family: Geometridae
- Genus: Eupithecia
- Species: E. latifurcata

Binomial name
- Eupithecia latifurcata Walker, 1863

Species of moth

Eupithecia latifurcata, found in Venezuela., is a moth in the family Geometridae.
