= Eupithecia usta =

Scientific classification
- Kingdom: Animalia
- Phylum: Arthropoda
- Class: Insecta
- Order: Lepidoptera
- Family: Geometridae
- Genus: Eupithecia
- Species: E. usta

Binomial name
- Eupithecia usta Butler, 1882

Species of moth

Eupithecia usta is a moth in the family Geometridae. It is found in Chile.
